= University of Florida =

Public university in Gainesville, Florida, US

- Former name: List: East Florida Seminary (1853–1861; 1866–1905) Florida Agricultural College (1884–1903) University of Florida at Lake City (1903–1905) St. Petersburg Normal and Industrial School (1893–1905) South Florida Military and Educational College (1894–1905) University of the State of Florida (1905–1909)
- Motto: Civium in moribus rei publicae salus (Latin); On seal: "In God We Trust"
- Motto in English: "The welfare of the state depends upon the morals of its citizens" (Note: The motto of UF was written by James Nesbitt Anderson, first Dean of the College of Arts & Sciences.)
- Type: Public land-grant research university
- Established: January 6, 1853; 173 years ago (Note: This is the year classes began at the East Florida Seminary, the oldest of the four institutions that were consolidated to create the modern University of Florida in 1905. This date was set by the Florida Board of Control in 1935; previously the university traced its founding date to 1905, when the predecessor institutions were merged by the Buckman Act.)
- Parent institution: State University System of Florida
- Accreditation: SACS
- Academic affiliations: AAU; ORAU; URA; Sea-grant; Space-grant
- Endowment: $2.69 billion (2025)
- Budget: $5.68 billion (2025)
- President: Stuart R. Bell
- Provost: Joseph Glover (interim)
- Faculty: 6,195 (2025)
- Administrative staff: 27,321 (2025)
- Students: 63,148 (2025)
- Undergraduates: 43,315 (2025)
- Postgraduates: 19,833 (2025)
- Location: Gainesville, Florida, United States; 29.6475°N 82.3450°W
- Campus: 2,000 acres (810 ha); Midsize city
- Other campuses: Apopka; Cedar Key; Davie; Fort Pierce; Hialeah; Jacksonville; Jupiter; Miami; Milton; Orlando; Plant City; St. Augustine; Sarasota; Seminole; Shalimar; Sunrise; Wimauma; Vicenza; Online
- Newspaper: The Independent Florida Alligator
- Colors: Orange and blue
- Nickname: Gators
- Sporting affiliations: NCAA Division I FBS – SEC; Big 12
- Mascot: Albert and Alberta Gator
- Website: ufl.edu

The University of Florida (Florida or UF) is a public land-grant research university in Gainesville, Florida, United States. It is a senior member of the State University System of Florida. The university traces its origins to 1853 and has operated continuously on its Gainesville campus since September 1906.

After the Florida state legislature's creation of performance standards in 2013, the Florida Board of Governors designated the University of Florida as a "preeminent university". The University of Florida is one of three members of the Association of American Universities in Florida and is classified among "R1: Doctoral Universities – Very high research spending and doctorate production".

The university is accredited by the Southern Association of Colleges and Schools (SACS). It is the fourth largest U.S. public university by student population, with 63,148 students enrolled as of fall 2025. The University of Florida is home to 16 academic colleges and more than 150 research centers and institutes. It offers multiple graduate professional programs—including business administration, engineering, law, dentistry, medicine, pharmacy and veterinary medicine—on one contiguous campus and administers 123 master's degree programs and 76 doctoral degree programs in 87 schools and departments. The university's seal is also the seal of the state of Florida, which is on the state flag, though in blue rather than multiple colors.

The University of Florida has been affiliated with 2 Nobel Laureates, 3 Marshall Scholars, 13 Rhodes Scholars, and 1 Fields Medalist. The university's intercollegiate sports teams, the Florida Gators, compete in National Collegiate Athletic Association (NCAA) Division I and the Southeastern Conference (SEC). As of 2021, University of Florida students and alumni have won 143 Olympic medals, including 69 gold medals.

== History ==
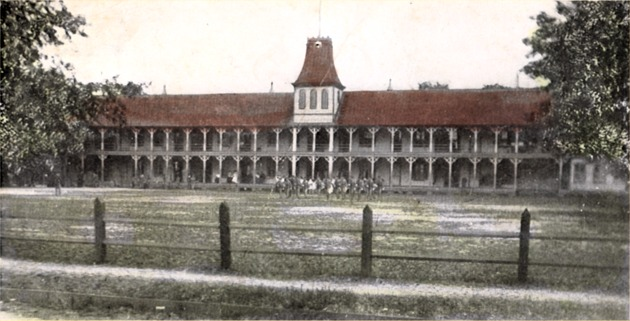
The East Florida Seminary, re-established in Gainesville in 1866, was the direct predecessor to the University of Florida

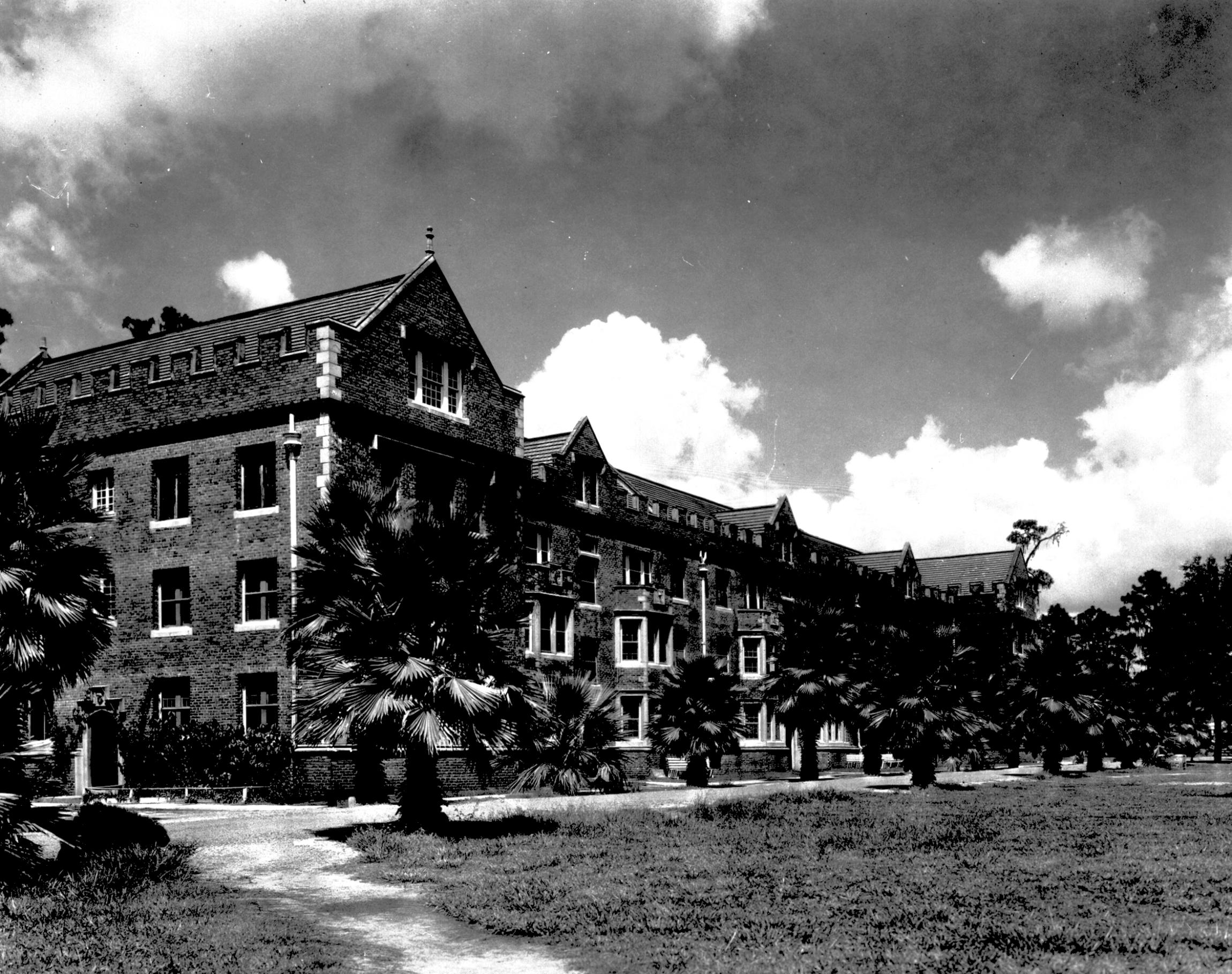
Buckman Hall, completed in 1906, opened as one of the University of Florida's first buildings following its establishment through the Buckman Act in 1905

=== Origins ===
The modern University of Florida traces its origins to 1853, when the East Florida Seminary, the oldest of its four predecessor institutions, was founded in 1853 as the East Florida Seminary in Ocala, Florida. The seminary was Florida's first state-supported institution of higher learning and operated until 1861 with the outbreak of the American Civil War. In 1866, the East Florida Seminary reopened in Gainesville on the grounds of the Gainesville Academy, a small private college that had closed during the war. (Note: The present university campus is about a mile to the west of the former location of the East Florida Seminary, which was a much smaller institution. Epworth Hall, the primary building of the seminary, still stands in downtown Gainesville.)

The second precursor to the University of Florida was Florida Agricultural College (FAC), the state's first land-grant college under the Morrill Act, established in Lake City in 1884. The Florida Legislature, looking to expand FAC's curriculum beyond agricultural and engineering offerings, changed the school's name to the "University of Florida" for the 1903–1904 academic year. This name was in use for two years. (Note: The name "University of Florida" has been given to three separate schools by the Florida legislature. The West Florida Seminary in Tallahassee officially held the name from 1883 until 1902 and Florida Agricultural College in Lake City used the name from 1903 until 1905, when the new University of the State of Florida was created in Gainesville. The school's name was simplified to "University of Florida" in 1909.)

=== University of the State of Florida ===
In 1905, the Florida Legislature passed the Buckman Act, which reorganized the state's publicly supported institutions of higher education. Under the act, Florida's six state-supported institutions were merged to form the State University System of Florida under the newly established Florida Board of Control. Four institutions were combined to create a new "University of the State of Florida" for white men: the University of Florida at Lake City (formerly Florida Agricultural College), the East Florida Seminary in Gainesville, the St. Petersburg Normal and Industrial School in St. Petersburg, and the South Florida Military College in Bartow.

The Buckman Act also created two other institutions segregated by race and gender: Florida Female College (later the Florida State College for Women and eventually Florida State University) for white women and the State Normal School for Colored Students (later Florida A&M) for African-American men and women, both in Tallahassee.

The Buckman Act did not specify where the new University of the State of Florida would be located. The City of Gainesville, led by its mayor William Reuben Thomas, campaigned to be the site of the new university, with its primary competitor being Lake City. After a brief but intense period of lobbying, the Board of Control selected Gainesville on July 6, 1905, and funds were allocated for the construction of a new campus on the western edge of the town. However, because the facilities in Gainesville would not be ready to accept students for several months, the new university was housed in the former campus of Florida Agricultural College in Lake City during the 1905–1906 academic year. Former FAC president Andrew Sledd was chosen to be the first president of the University of the State of Florida.

The University of the State of Florida's first semester in Gainesville began on September 26, 1906, with an enrollment of 102 students. Two buildings had been completed at the time: Buckman Hall, named after the primary author of the law that created the university, and Thomas Hall, named after the mayor of Gainesville who had led the successful effort to bring the school to town. Both structures were designed by William A. Edwards, who designed many of the university's original buildings in the Collegiate Gothic style in his role as lead architect for Florida's Board of Control.

During his term, first university president Andrew Sledd often clashed with key members of the Board of Control over his insistence on rigorous admissions requirements, which his detractors claimed was unreasonably impeding the growth of enrollment. Sledd resigned over these issues in 1909.

=== Growth, mascots, and establishment of colleges ===
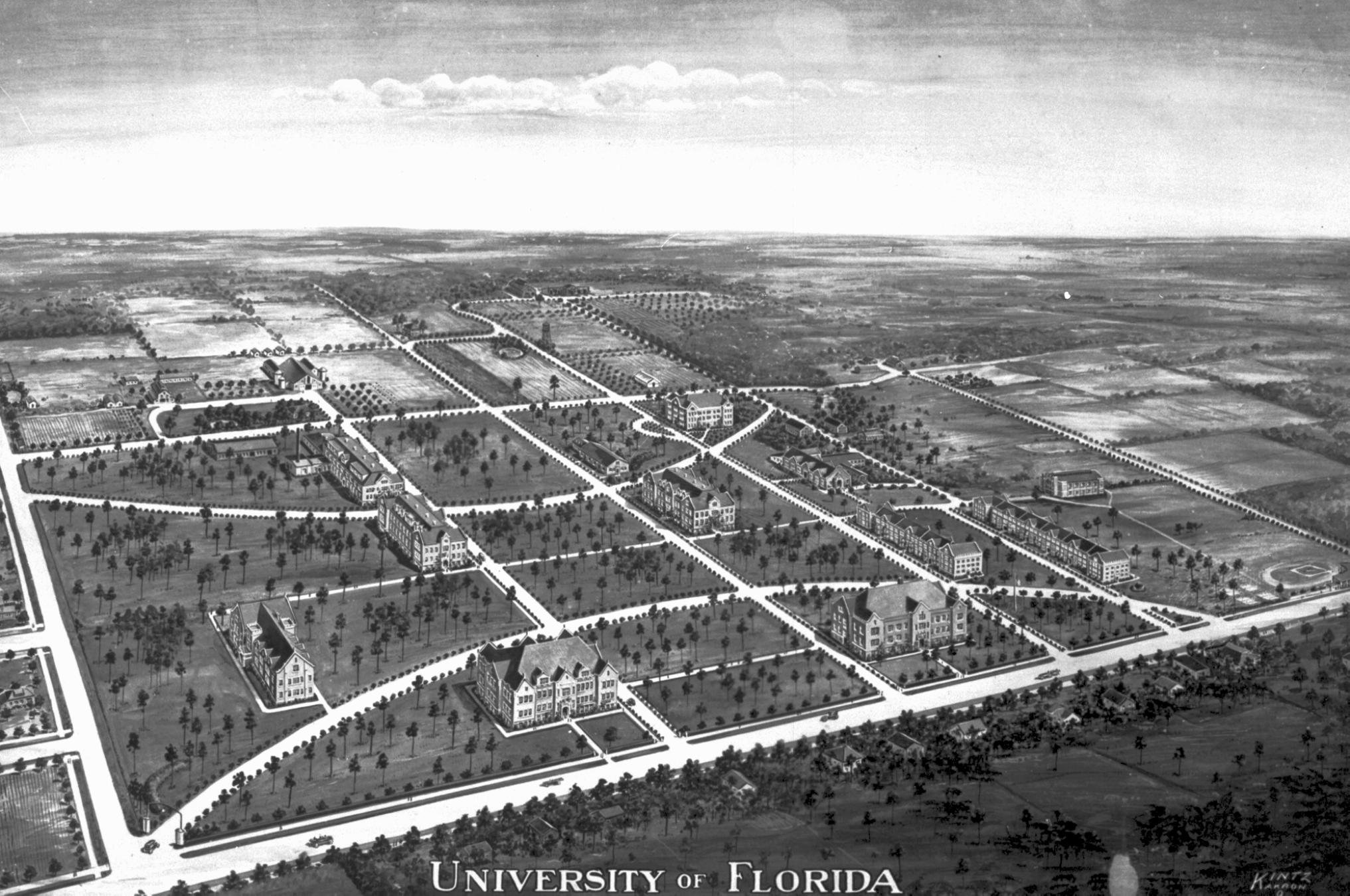
The University of Florida campus in 1906, looking southwest

Florida State College for Women president Albert Murphree was named UF's second president before the 1909–1910 academic year, which was also when the school's name was simplified from the "University of the State of Florida" to the "University of Florida". Murphree oversaw a reorganization of the university that included the establishment of several colleges, beginning with colleges of law, engineering, and liberal arts and sciences by 1910. Murphree was also instrumental in the founding of the Florida Blue Key leadership society and in building total enrollment from under 200 to over 2000. He is the only University of Florida president honored with a statue on campus.

The alligator became the school's informal mascot when a local vendor designed and sold school pennants imprinted with the animal, which is very common in lakes in and around Gainesville and throughout the state. The 'gator was a popular choice, and the university's sports teams had officially adopted the nickname by 1911. The school colors of orange and blue were also officially established in 1911, though the reasons for the choice are unclear. The most likely rationale was that they are a combination of the colors of the university's two largest predecessor institutions, as the East Florida Seminary used orange and black while Florida Agricultural College used blue and white. The older schools' colors may have been an homage to early Scottish and Ulster-Scots Presbyterian settlers of north central Florida, whose ancestors were originally from Northern Ireland and the Scottish Lowlands.

In 1924, the Florida Legislature mandated women of a "mature age" (at least twenty-one years old) who had completed sixty semester hours from a "reputable educational institution" be allowed to enroll during regular semesters at the University of Florida in programs that were unavailable at Florida State College for Women. Before this, only the summer semester was coeducational, to accommodate women teachers who wanted to further their education during the summer break. Lassie Goodbread-Black from Lake City became the first woman to enroll at the University of Florida, in the College of Agriculture in 1925.

Murphree died in 1928 and John J. Tigert was named UF's third president. Early in his tenure, Tigert helped organize the semi-independent University Athletic Association to plan the construction of Florida Field and operate the school's athletic programs. Disgusted by the under-the-table payments being made by universities to athletes, Tigert established the grant-in-aid athletic scholarship program in the early 1930s, which was the genesis of the modern athletic scholarship plan used by the National Collegiate Athletic Association. Inventor and educator Blake R. Van Leer was hired as Dean to launch new engineering departments and scholarships. Van Leer also managed all applications for federal funding, chaired the Advanced Planning Committee per Tigert's request. These efforts included consulting for the Florida Emergency Relief Administration throughout the 1930s.

=== Post World War II ===
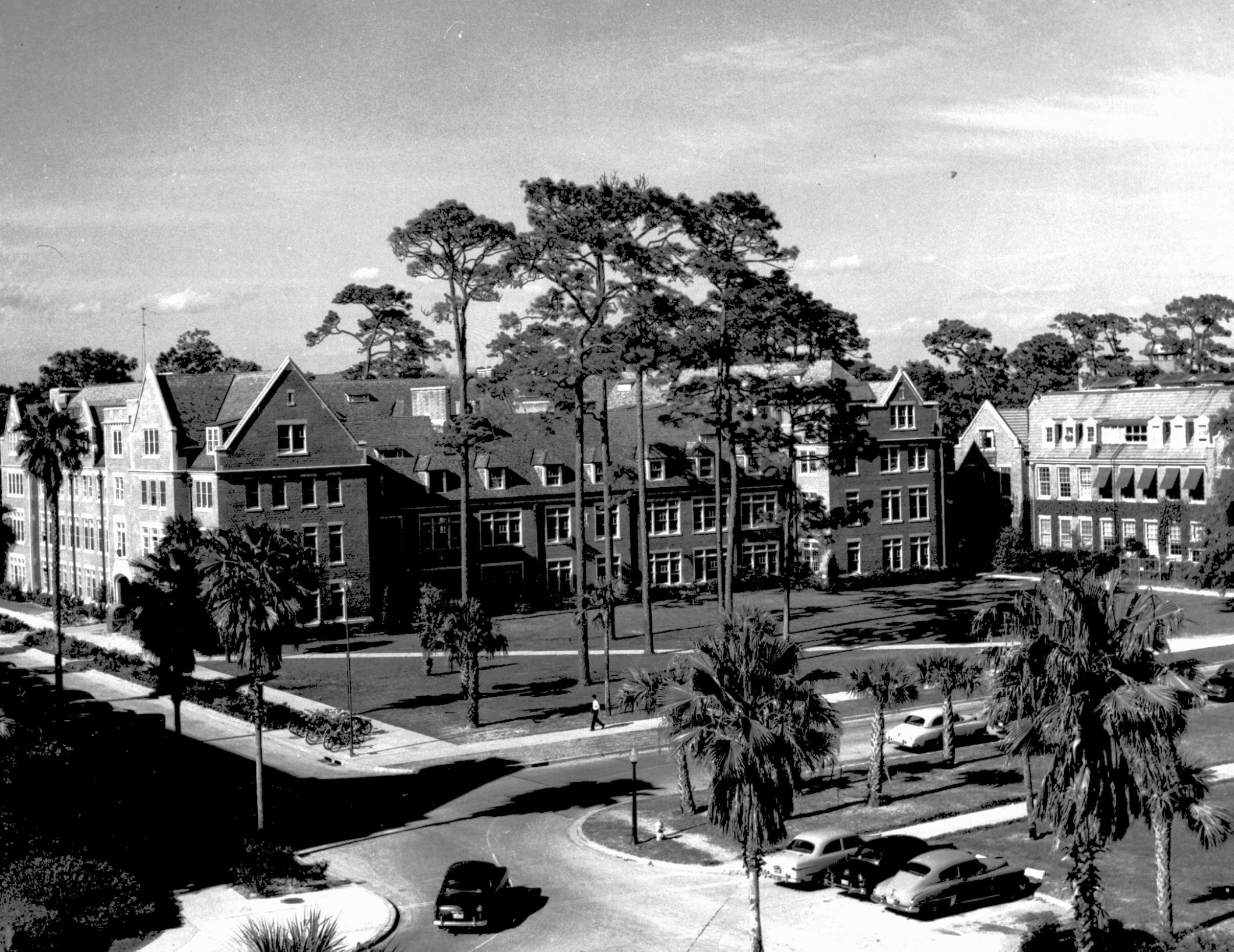
Griffin–Floyd Hall and Leigh Hall was completed in 1912 and 1927 respectively

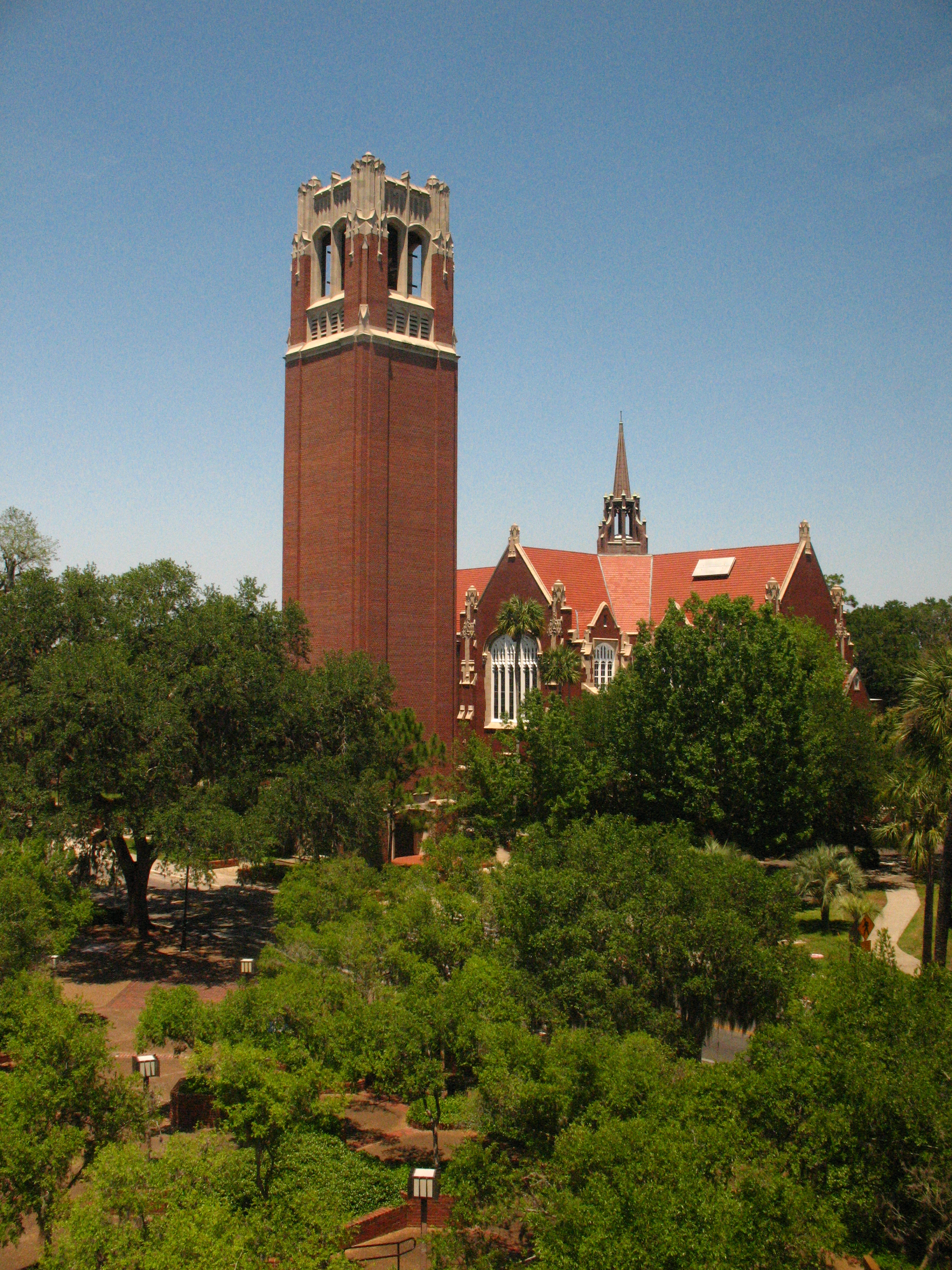
Century Tower, completed in 1953, commemorates the 100th anniversary of origins of UF and memorializes students and alumni who died in the World Wars

Beginning in 1946, there was dramatically increased interest among male applicants who wanted to attend the University of Florida, mostly returning World War II veterans who could attend college under the GI Bill of Rights (Servicemen's Readjustment Act). Unable to immediately accommodate this increased demand, the Florida Board of Control opened the Tallahassee Branch of the University of Florida on the campus of Florida State College for Women in Tallahassee. By the end of the 1946–47 school year, 954 men were enrolled at the Tallahassee Branch. The following semester, the Florida Legislature returned the Florida State College for Women to coeducational status and renamed it Florida State University. These events also opened up all of the colleges that comprise the University of Florida to female students. Florida Women's Hall of Fame member Maryly Van Leer became the first woman to receive from the University of Florida a master's degree in engineering.

African-American students were allowed to enroll starting in 1958. From its inception until 1958, only white students were allowed to study at the University of Florida. In 1958, George H. Starke became the first Black student when he entered the College of Law. In 1959, Daphne Duval Williams became the first Black woman student when she entered the College of Education.

Starting in the late 1950s, University of Florida faculty and students were monitored and interrogated by the Florida Legislative Investigation Committee, also known as the Johns Committee, with the goal of exposing homosexual behavior at the university. University president J. Wayne Reitz cooperated with the investigation, which caused at least 15 faculty and 50 students to leave or be forced out of the university after the committee targeted them. The committee's work culminated in the publication of a report called Homosexuality and Citizenship in Florida in 1964. The Johns Committee is considered a late extension of McCarthyism and the Lavender Scare.

Rapid campus expansion began in the 1950s and continues today. The Carleton Auditorium, Century Tower, Little Hall, Beaty Towers, the Constans Theatre, Library West, and the Reitz Student Union were all completed during this period. Shands Hospital opened in 1958 along with the University of Florida College of Medicine to join the established College of Pharmacy. The J. Wayne Reitz Union, the student union of the University of Florida, was completed in 1967. The union was named in honor of J. Wayne Reitz, the fifth president of the university, who served from 1955 to 1967. Library West was constructed in 1967 and was originally designated as the "Graduate Research Library." Library East (now Smathers Library) was at the same time designated as the undergraduate library.

=== National and international prominence ===
In 1985, the University of Florida was invited to join the Association of American Universities.

During President Bernie Machen's tenure and with the backing of the University of Florida Board of Trustees, a significant policy shift was announced in 2009 for the university. This shift involved reducing the number of undergraduate students and reallocating financial and academic resources toward graduate education and research initiatives.

The University of Florida is one of three Florida public universities, along with Florida State University and the University of South Florida, to be designated as a "preeminent university" by Florida senate bill 1076, enacted by the Florida legislature and signed into law by the governor in 2013. As a result, the preeminent universities receive additional funding to improve the academics and national reputation of higher education within the state of Florida.

In 2017, the University of Florida achieved a notable milestone by becoming the first university in the state of Florida to rank among the top ten best public universities according to U.S. News. In 2017, University President Kent Fuchs unveiled a plan to recruit 500 new faculty members to elevate the university's ranking among the top five best public universities. The majority of these new hires are concentrated in STEM fields. In 2018, 230 faculty members were hired, with the remaining 270 faculty positions expected to be filled by the fall of 2019.

In the 2025 fiscal year, the University of Florida received more than $1.33 billion in annual sponsored research expenditures.

=== Academic freedom controversy ===
In October 2021, three professors filed a federal lawsuit against UF, claiming they were barred from testifying in a voting rights lawsuit against Florida secretary of state Laurel Lee and Governor Ron DeSantis. The university claimed that testifying against the state would be "adverse to the university’s interests as a state of Florida institution," igniting controversy over alleged inappropriate political influence at the university, interference in academic freedom, and violation of the professors' First Amendment rights. Earlier in the year, the chairman of UF's Board of Trustees, Morteza Hosseini, reportedly pushed the university to hire Joseph Ladapo, a controversial doctor known for his support of DeSantis's COVID-19 policies and promotion of COVID misinformation. Hosseini is a major Republican Party donor and DeSantis adviser.

The reports prompted investigations by the U.S. House Subcommittee on Civil Rights and Civil Liberties, the UF Faculty Senate, and UF's accrediting body, the Southern Association of Colleges and Schools (SACSCOC). Further reporting in November 2021 revealed that the university had prohibited at least five more professors from offering expertise in legal cases, including a professor of pediatric medicine who was not allowed to offer expert testimony in a case related to masking of children during the COVID pandemic, a measure supported by medical experts but opposed by Governor DeSantis.

In response to the allegations, UF's administration appointed a task force to "review the university's conflict of interest policy and examine it for consistency and fidelity" and reversed its decision to bar professors from testifying, stating that they were permitted to testify pro bono on their own time. The recommendations of the task force were accepted by UF president Kent Fuchs in late November 2021. However, a December 2021 report from the UF Faculty Senate deepened the controversy, citing external pressure and a widespread fear of reprisal if faculty promoted unpopular viewpoints and alleging that course titles on racial topics were edited, faculty were advised against criticizing Governor DeSantis or his policies, and medical researchers were compelled to destroy data related to the COVID pandemic.

== Campus ==
University of Florida Campus Landmarks Museums Libraries Arts venues Student union Student housing Athletics Hospitals Open spaces Campus

The University of Florida campus encompasses over 2,000 acres (8.1 km^{2}). The campus is home to many notable structures, such as Century Tower, a 157-foot-tall (48 m) carillon tower in the center of the historic district. Other notable facilities include the Health Science Center, Steve Spurrier-Florida Field at Ben Hill Griffin Stadium, Smathers Library, Phillips Center for the Performing Arts, Harn Museum, University Auditorium, O'Connell Center, and The Hub.

=== The Reitz Union ===
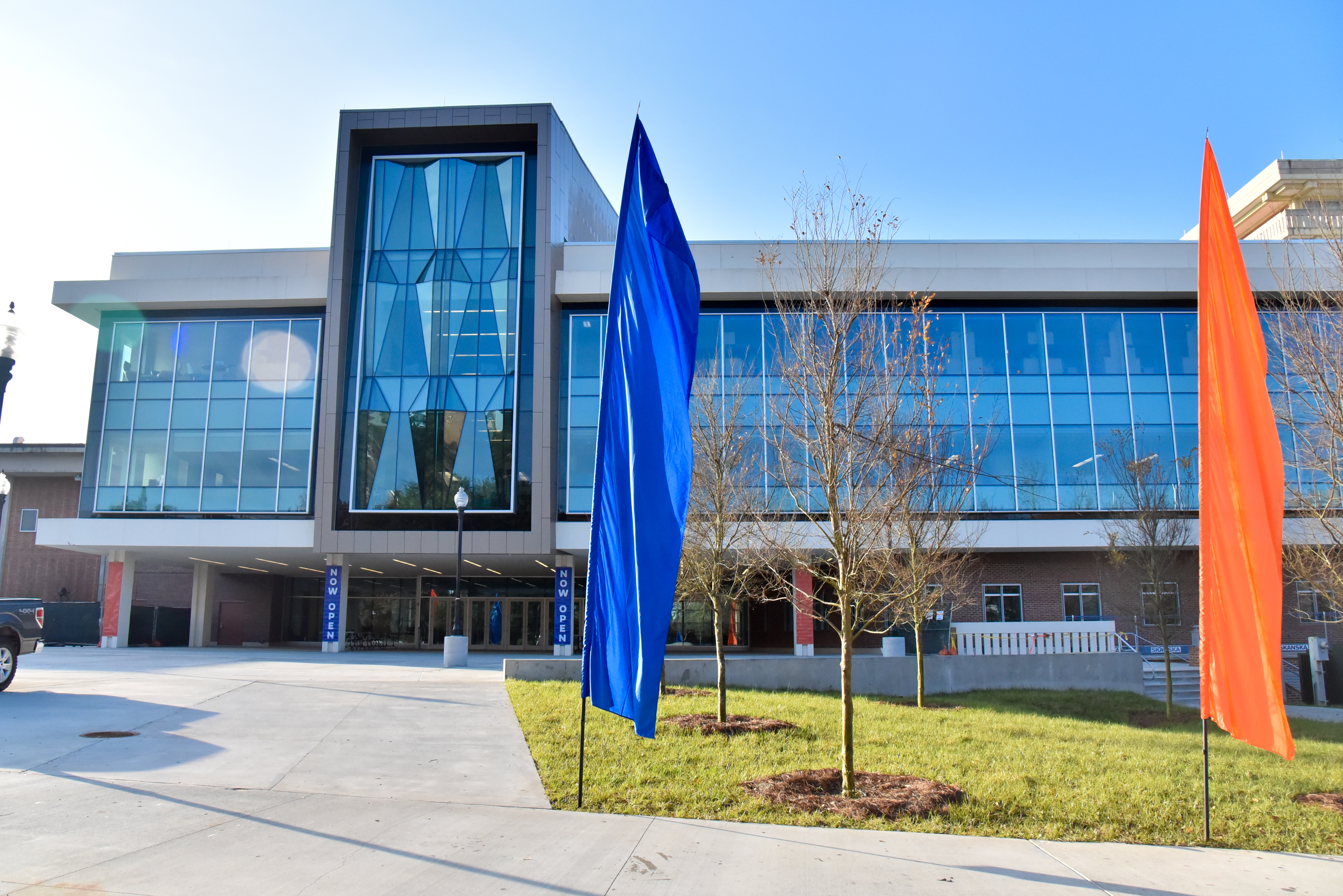
The north facade of the J. Wayne Reitz Union

The J. Wayne Reitz Union is the student union of the University of Florida, located on Museum Road on the university campus in Gainesville, Florida, United States. The union was named in honor of J. Wayne Reitz, the fifth president of the university, who served from 1955 to 1967. The building, which was originally completed in 1967, contains dining facilities, meeting rooms, offices, a computer lab, a game room, an outdoor amphitheater, retail stores, a movie theater and a hotel.

On February 1, 2016, it was reopened after an extensive renovation and expansion. The 138,000 square feet (12,800 m^{2}) of new space includes support space for student organizations, new lounges, study spaces, a game room, an arts and crafts center and dance studios.

=== Historic sites ===
The Plaza of the Americas is a major center for student activities at the University of Florida

A number of the University of Florida's buildings are historically significant. The University of Florida Campus Historic District comprises 19 buildings and encompasses approximately 650 acres (2.6 km^{2}). Two buildings outside the historic district, the old WRUF radio station (now the university police station) and Norman Hall (formerly the P.K. Yonge Laboratory School), are also listed on the historic register. The buildings on the U.S. National Register of Historic Places for their architectural or historic significance are:

- Anderson Hall
- Bryan Hall
- Buckman Hall
- Carlton Auditorium
- Century Tower
- Dauer Hall
- Epworth Hall
- Fletcher Hall
- Florida Gymnasium
- Griffin-Floyd Hall
- Infirmary

- Keene-Flint Hall
- Leigh Hall
- Mallory Hall
- Matherly Hall
- Murphree Hall
- Newell Hall
- Norman Hall
- Peabody Hall
- Plaza of the Americas
- Reid Hall

- Rolfs Hall
- Sledd Hall
- Smathers Library (Library East)
- The Hub
- Thomas Hall
- Tigert Hall
- University Auditorium
- Walker Hall
- Weil Hall
- Women's Gymnasium
- Yulee Hall

=== Libraries ===
==== George A. Smathers Libraries ====
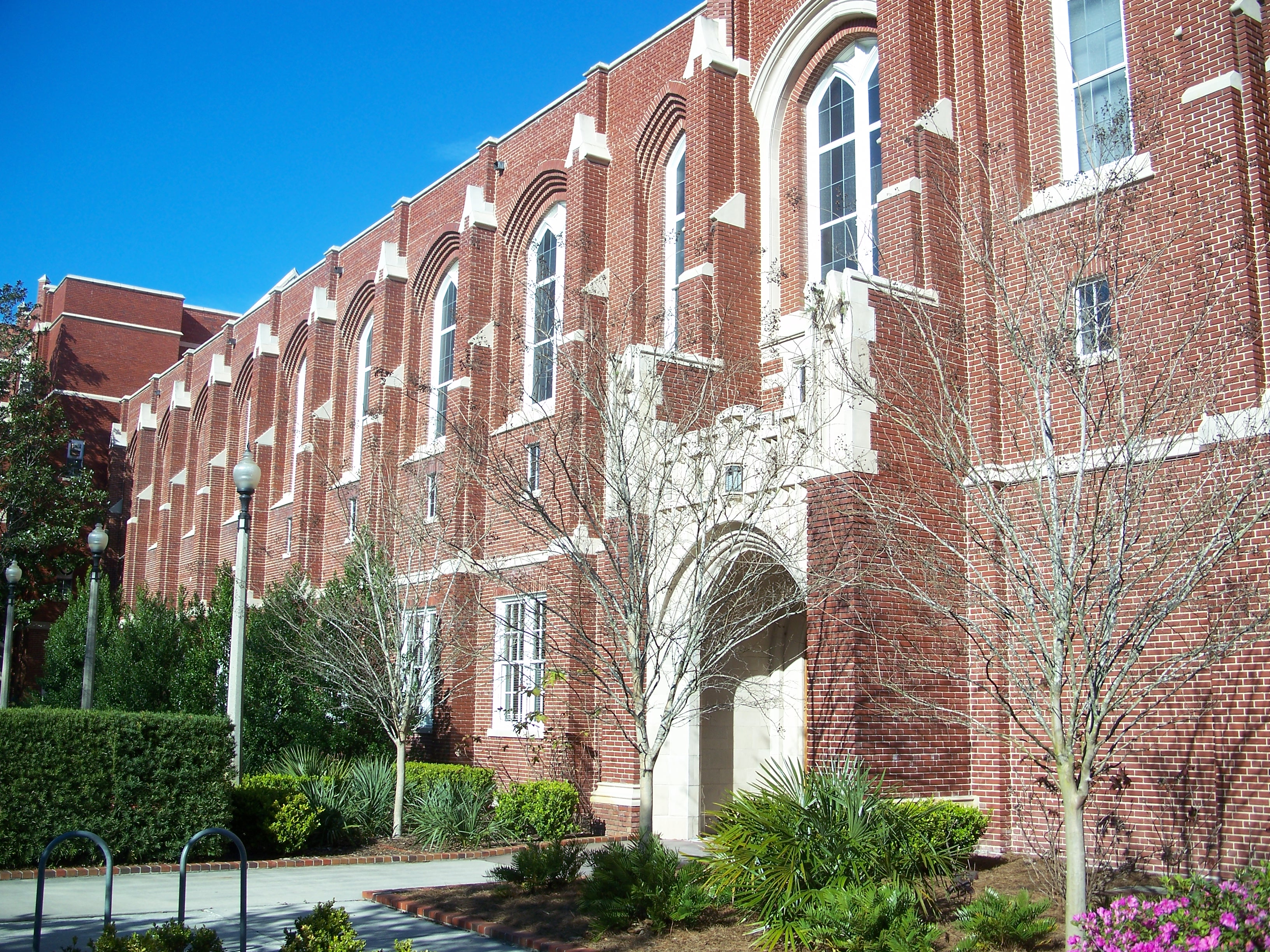
Smathers Library, opened in 1926

The George A. Smathers Libraries at the University of Florida is one of the largest university library systems in the United States. The George A. Smathers Libraries has a collection of over 6 million+ print volumes, 1.5 million digital books, 1,000+ databases, approximately 150 thousand print/digital journals, and over 14 million digital pages Collections cover virtually all disciplines and include a wide array of formats—from books and journals to manuscripts, maps, and recorded music. An increasing number of the collections are digital and are accessible on the Internet from the library web page or the library catalog. The George A. Smathers Libraries support all academic programs except those served by the Levin College of Law.

==== Renovations ====
In 2006, Library West went through a $30 million renovation that doubled capacity. This facility is now better equipped to handle the information technology students need to complete their studies. Such progress is represented by its state-of-the-art Information Commons, which offers production studios, digital media computing areas, and a presentation area.

==== Lawton Chiles Legal Information Center ====
The Levin College of Law's students, faculty, and guests are served by Lawton Chiles Legal Information Center.

=== Museums ===
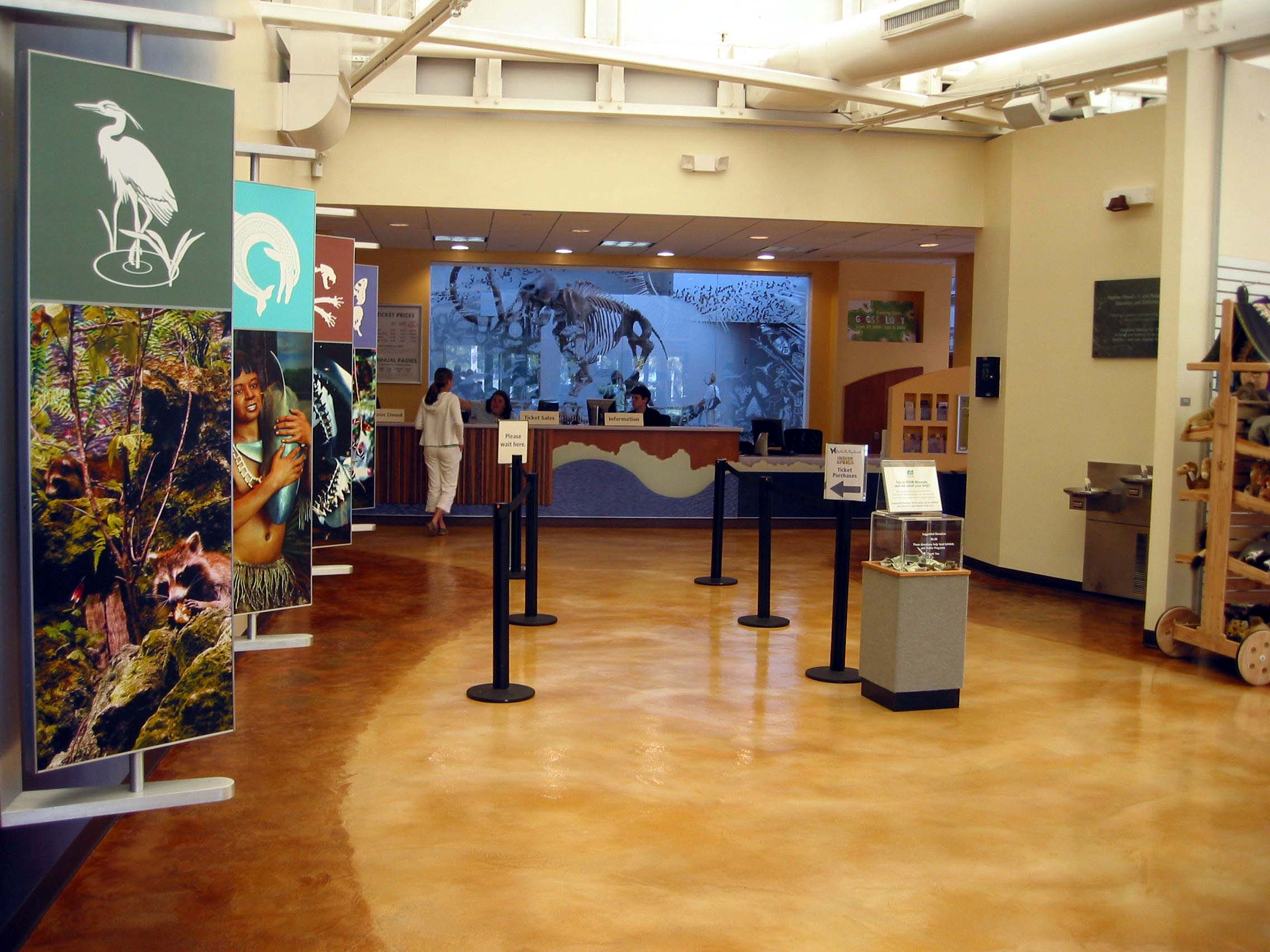
Museum of Natural History

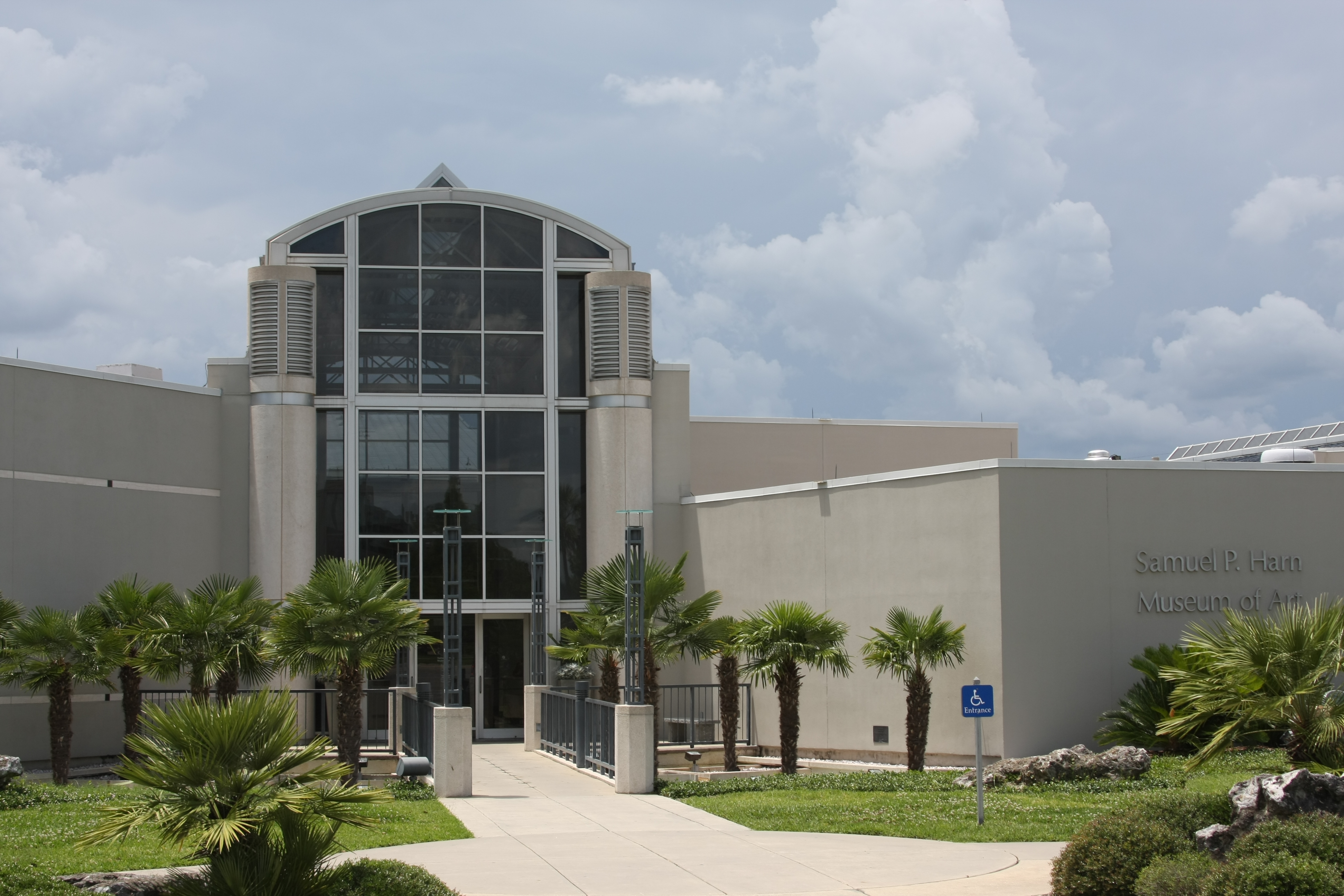
Harn Museum of Art

The Florida Museum of Natural History, established in 1891, is one of the country's oldest natural history museums and was officially chartered by the state of Florida. This facility is dedicated to understanding, preserving and interpreting biological diversity and cultural heritage. In over 100 years of operations, the Florida Museum of Natural History has been housed in several buildings, from the Seagle Building to facilities at Dickinson Hall, Powell Hall, and the Randell Research Center.

In 2000 the McGuire Center for Lepidoptera and Biodiversity was opened after a generous donation from University of Florida benefactors. The McGuire Center houses a collection of more than six million butterfly and moth specimens, making it one of the largest collections of Lepidoptera in the world, rivaling the Natural History Museum in London, England.

The Samuel P. Harn Museum of Art, established in 1990, is also at the University of Florida on the southwest part of campus. This facility is one of the largest university art museums in the South, the Harn has more than 7,000 works in its permanent collection and an array of temporary exhibitions. The museum's permanent collections focus on Asian, African, modern and contemporary art, as well as photography. The university sponsors educational programs at the museum including films, lectures, interactive activities, and school and family offerings. In October 2005 the Harn expanded by more than 18,000 square feet (1,700 m^{2}) with the opening of the Mary Ann Harn Cofrin Pavilion, which includes new educational and meeting areas and the Camellia Court Cafe, the first eatery for visitors of the Cultural Plaza.

=== Performing arts and music ===
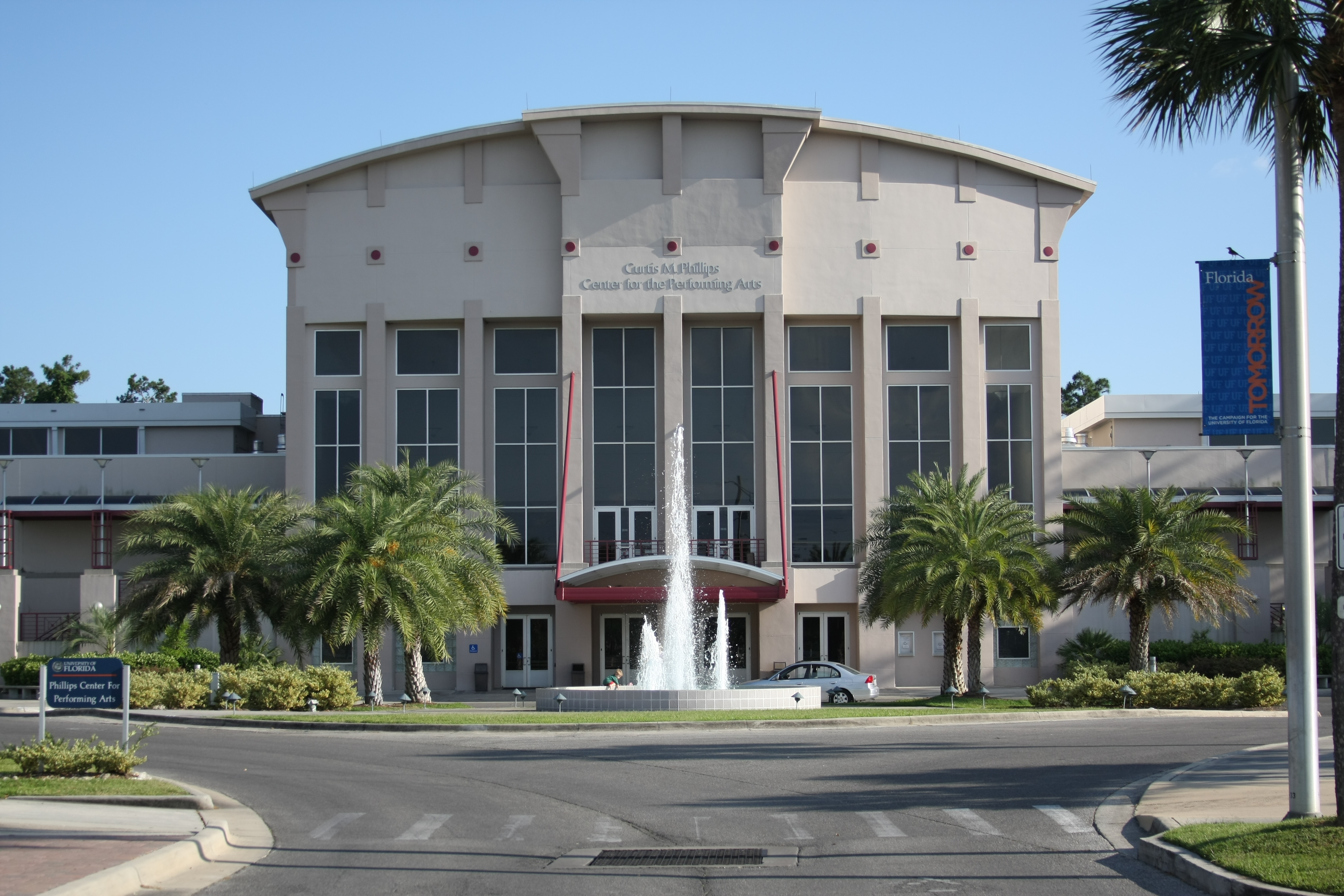
Phillips Center

Performing arts venues at the University of Florida include the Curtis M. Phillips Center for the Performing Arts, the University Auditorium, Constans Theatre, the Baughman Center, and performances at the O'Connell Center. The mission is to provide an unparalleled experience where performing artists create and share knowledge to serve the student body, faculty, and staff at the university; Gainesville residents; and visitors to North Central Florida.

The University Auditorium was founded in the mid-1920s and is home to the Anderson Memorial Organ. The auditorium has a concert stage and can seat up to 843 patrons. The venue is suitable for musical concerts, special lectures, convocations, dance concerts, and pageants.

The Phillips Center for the Performing Arts was founded in 1992 and is a performing arts theatre. The Phillips Center is on the western side of campus, and hosts established and emerging national and international artists on the main stage, as well as the annual Miss University of Florida pageant and performances by the University of Florida's original student-run dance company, Floridance. The Phillips Center consists of a 1,700-seat proscenium hall and the 200-seat Squitieri Studio Theatre.

Constans Theatre was founded in 1967 and is a performing arts venue next to the J. Wayne Reitz Union. Constans Theatre serves as a venue for musical concerts, theater, dance, and lectures, and is a sub-venue of the Nadine McGuire Pavilion and Dance Pavilion.

The Baughman Center was founded in 2000 and serves as a venue for small musical and performing arts events. The facility consists of two buildings next to Lake Alice on the western portion of campus. The main building is a 1,500-square-foot (140 m^{2}) pavilion, the other is a 1,000-square-foot (93 m^{2}) administrative building. The Baughman Center can accommodate up to 96 patrons.

=== Sustainability ===
In 2005, the University of Florida became a Certified Audubon Cooperative Sanctuary for environmental and wildlife management, resource conservation, environmental education, waste management, and outreach.

Through long-term environmental initiatives, the University of Florida created an Office of Sustainability in 2006. Their mission is to improve environmental sustainability in many areas on campus. They have stated their goals are to produce zero waste by 2015 and to achieve Carbon Neutrality by 2025. Recently the university appointed a new sustainability director. Florida received a "B+" grade on the 2009 College Sustainability Report Card for its environmental and sustainability initiatives. In 2009, "B+" was the second highest grade awarded by the Sustainable Endowments Institute.

== Academics ==
=== Undergraduate admissions ===
Fall first-time freshman admission statistics
	2023	2022	2020	2019	2018	2017
Applicants	65,375	64,473	48,193	38,069	38,905	32,747
Admits	15,707	15,054	15,002	13,925	15,077	13,758
Enrolls	6,762	6,612	6,333	6,554	6,801	6,428
Admit rate	24.0%	23.3%	31.1%	36.6%	38.8%	42.0%
Yield rate	43.1%	43.9%	42.2%	47.1%	45.1%	46.7%
SAT composite*	1320–1470 (79%†)	1320–1470 (81%†)	1310–1450 (81%†)	1320–1450 (85%†)	1280–1440 (82%†)	1240–1400 (79%†)
ACT composite*	28–33 (41%†)	28–33 (41%†)	29–33 (50%†)	28–33 (50%†)	27–32 (57%†)	28–32 (71%†)
* middle 50% range † percentage of first-time freshmen who chose to submit

The 2022 annual ranking of U.S. News & World Report categorizes the University of Florida as "most selective." For the Class of 2027 (enrolled fall 2023), Florida's acceptance rate was 24.0%. Of those accepted, 6,612 enrolled, a yield rate (the percentage of accepted students who choose to attend the university) of 43.1%.

Florida's freshman retention rate is 97%, with 89% going on to graduate within six years.

The Fall 2023 incoming freshman class had an average 1390 SAT score, and a 31 ACT score. 3% of these students were foreign nationals, while 49% were White Americans, 22% were Hispanic Americans, 14% were Asian Americans, and 6% were Black Americans.

The University of Florida is a college-sponsor of the National Merit Scholarship Program and sponsored 288 Merit Scholarship awards in 2020. In the 2020–2021 academic year, 342 freshman students were National Merit Scholars. The university is need-blind for domestic applicants.

In 2007, the University of Florida joined the University of Virginia, Harvard University, the University of North Carolina at Chapel Hill, and Princeton University in announcing the discontinuation of early decision admissions to foster economic diversity in their student bodies. These universities assert early decision admissions forces students to accept an offer of admission before evaluating the financial aid offers from multiple universities. The university's single application deadline is November 1.

=== Enrollment ===
Undergraduate demographics as of Fall 2025
Race and ethnicity	Total
White	48%
Hispanic	24%
Asian	12%
Other (Note: Other consists of Multiracial Americans & those who prefer to not say.)	6%
Black	5%
Foreign national	5%
Economic diversity	Total
Low-income (Note: The percentage of students who received an income-based federal Pell grant intended for low-income students.)	23%
Affluent (Note: The percentage of students who are a part of the American middle class at the bare minimum.)	77%

According to the Jewish Telegraphic Agency, UF has "the largest Jewish student body in the US." It is estimated that 18% of UF undergraduate and graduate students identify as Jewish compared to around 2% of the United States population.

A 2014 social mobility report conducted by The New York Times found that 48% of UF undergraduate students came from families with incomes above the 80th percentile (>$110,000 (2015 USD)), while 6% came from families in the bottom 20th percentiles (<$20,000 (2015 USD)). The same report also indicates that 30% of the student body came from families from the top 10% of households, and 3% came from the top 1%.

In 2016, the university had 5,169 international students. According to the Annual Admissions Report conducted by UF in 2019, roughly 17% of the incoming freshman class was entering from outside of Florida. The majority of freshmen starting at the University of Florida come from urban backgrounds with the biggest demographic hailing from South Florida cities; the metropolitan areas of Tampa, Orlando, and Jacksonville historically form a significant share of the incoming class as well. New York and New Jersey are the biggest feeder states outside of Florida.

The University of Florida is ranked second overall in the United States for the number of bachelor's degrees awarded to African-Americans, and third overall for Hispanics. The university ranks fifth in the number of doctoral degrees awarded to African-Americans, and second overall for Hispanics, and third in number of professional degrees awarded to African-Americans, and second overall for Hispanics. The university offers multiple graduate programs—including engineering, business, law and medicine—on one contiguous campus, and coordinates 123 master's degree programs and 76 doctoral degree programs in 87 schools and departments.

=== Tuition and scholarships ===
For the 2018–19 academic year, tuition and fees were $6,381 for in-state undergraduate students, and $28,658 for out-of-state undergraduate students. Tuition for online courses is lower and for graduate courses is higher.

The Lombardi Scholars Program, created in 2002 and named in honor of the university's ninth president John V. Lombardi, is a merit scholarship for Florida students. The scholarship offers $2,700 a semester for eight to ten semesters.

The J. Wayne Reitz Scholars Program, created in 1997 and named in honor of the university's fifth president J. Wayne Reitz, is a leadership and merit-based scholarship for Florida students. Its yearly $2,500 stipend may be renewed for up to three years.

The Machen Florida Opportunity Scholars Program was created in 2005. This is a full grant and scholarship financial aid package designed to help new, low-income UF students that are the first to attend college in their families. Every year, 300 scholarships are awarded to incoming freshmen with an average family income of $18,408.

The Alec Courtelis Award is given annually at the International Student Academics Awards Ceremony. The award is given to international students, in recognition of their academic excellence and outstanding contribution to the university and community. Louise Courtelis established the Alec Courtelis Award in honor of husband, a successful businessman and former chairman of the Florida Board of Regents in 1996.

=== Rankings ===
Academic rankings

National
- Forbes: 25
- U.S. News & World Report: 30 (tie)
- Washington Monthly: 22
- WSJ/College Pulse: 15

Global
- ARWU: 101–150
- QS: 212 (tie)
- THE: 130 (tie)
- U.S. News & World Report: 109 (tie)

USN&WR Global Rankings
Overall Global University Ranking	107
Agricultural Sciences	14
Arts & Humanities	150
Biology & Biochemistry	114
Chemistry	103
Clinical Medicine	100
Computer Science	117
Economics & Business	95
Electrical & Electronic Engineering	128
Engineering	113
Environment/Ecology	28
Geosciences	154
Immunology	129
Materials Science	170
Mathematics	185
Microbiology	62
Molecular Biology & Genetics	135
Neuroscience & Behavior	101
Pharmacology & Toxicology	50
Physics	116
Plant & Animal Science	4
Psychiatry/Psychology	99
Social Sciences & Public Health	102
Space Science	102
Surgery	68

In its 2021 edition, U.S. News & World Report (USN&WR) ranked the University of Florida as tied for the fifth-best public university in the United States, and tied for 28th overall among all national universities, public and private.

Many of the University of Florida's graduate schools have received top-50 national rankings from U.S. News & World Report with the school of education 25th, Florida's Hough School of Business 25th, Florida's Medical School (research) tied for 43rd, the Engineering School tied for 45th, the Levin College of Law tied for 31st, and the Nursing School tied for 24th in the 2020 rankings.

Florida's graduate programs ranked for 2020 by USN&WR in the nation's top 50 were audiology tied for 26th, analytical chemistry 11th, clinical psychology tied for 31st, computer science tied for 49th, criminology 19th, health care management tied for 33rd, nursing-midwifery tied for 35th, occupational therapy tied for 17th, pharmacy tied for 9th, physical therapy tied for 10th, physician assistant tied for 21st, physics tied for 37th, psychology tied for 39th, public health tied for 37th, speech-language pathology tied for 28th, statistics tied for 40th, and veterinary medicine 9th.

The 2018 Academic Ranking of World Universities list assessed the University of Florida as 86th among global universities, based on overall research output and faculty awards. In 2017, Washington Monthly ranked the University of Florida 18th among national universities, with criteria based on research, community service, and social mobility. The lowest national ranking received by the university from a major publication comes from Forbes which ranked the university 68th in the nation in 2018. This ranking focuses mainly on net positive financial impact, in contrast to other rankings, and generally ranks liberal arts colleges above most research universities.

University of Florida received the following rankings by The Princeton Review in its 2020 Best 380 Colleges Rankings: 13th for Best Value Colleges without Aid, 18th for Lots of Beer, and 42nd for Best Value Colleges. It also was named the number one vegan-friendly school for 2014, according to a survey conducted by PETA.

On Forbes' 2016 list of Best Value Public Colleges, UF was ranked second. It was also ranked third on Forbes' Overall Best Value Colleges Nationwide. The University of Florida is ranked among The Best Colleges in America in 2022 and positioned #8 on Money.com’s list.

=== Colleges and academic divisions ===
The University of Florida is the flagship university of the state and it has 16 different colleges. UF has more than 150 research centers, service centers, education centers, bureaus, and institutes offering more than 100 undergraduate majors and 200 graduate degrees.

These colleges include:

College/school founding
College/school	Year founded
College of Agricultural and Life Sciences	1906
Rinker School of Building Construction	1906
College of Education	1906
Levin College of Law	1909
College of Engineering	1910
College of Liberal Arts and Sciences	1910
College of Pharmacy	1923
College of Journalism and Communications	1925
College of Design Construction and Planning	1925
Warrington College of Business	1926
P.K. Yonge Research School	1934
College of Health and Human Performance	1946
J. Hillis Miller Health Science Center	1956
College of Medicine	1956
College of Nursing	1956
College of Public Health and Health Professions	1958
Institute of Food and Agricultural Sciences	1964
College of Dentistry	1972
College of the Arts	1975
College of Veterinary Medicine	1976
Division of Continuing Education	1976
Fisher School of Accounting	1977
Hamilton School for Classical and Civic Education	2022

=== Honors program ===
The University of Florida has an honors program; during application to the university, students must apply separately to the Honors Program and show significant academic achievement to be accepted. There are over 100 courses offered exclusively to students in this program. In 2023, 14,089 students applied for 1,778 available seats. The Honors Program also offers housing for freshman in the Honors Village Residential Complex. The program also offers special scholarships, internships, research, and study abroad opportunities.

=== Career placement ===
The University of Florida Career Resource Center is in the Reitz Student Union. Its mission is to assist students and alumni who are seeking career development, career experiences, and employment opportunities. These services involve on and off-campus job interviews, career planning, assistance in applying to graduate and professional schools, and internship and co-op placements. The Career Resource Center offers workshops, information sessions, career fairs, and advisement on future career options. Staff also counsel students and alumni regarding resumes and portfolios, interviewing tactics, cover letters, job strategies and other potential leads for finding employment in the corporate, academic and government sectors.

The Princeton Review ranked the Career Resource Center as the best among 368 ranked universities in career and job placement services in 2010, and fourth overall in 2011.

== Research ==
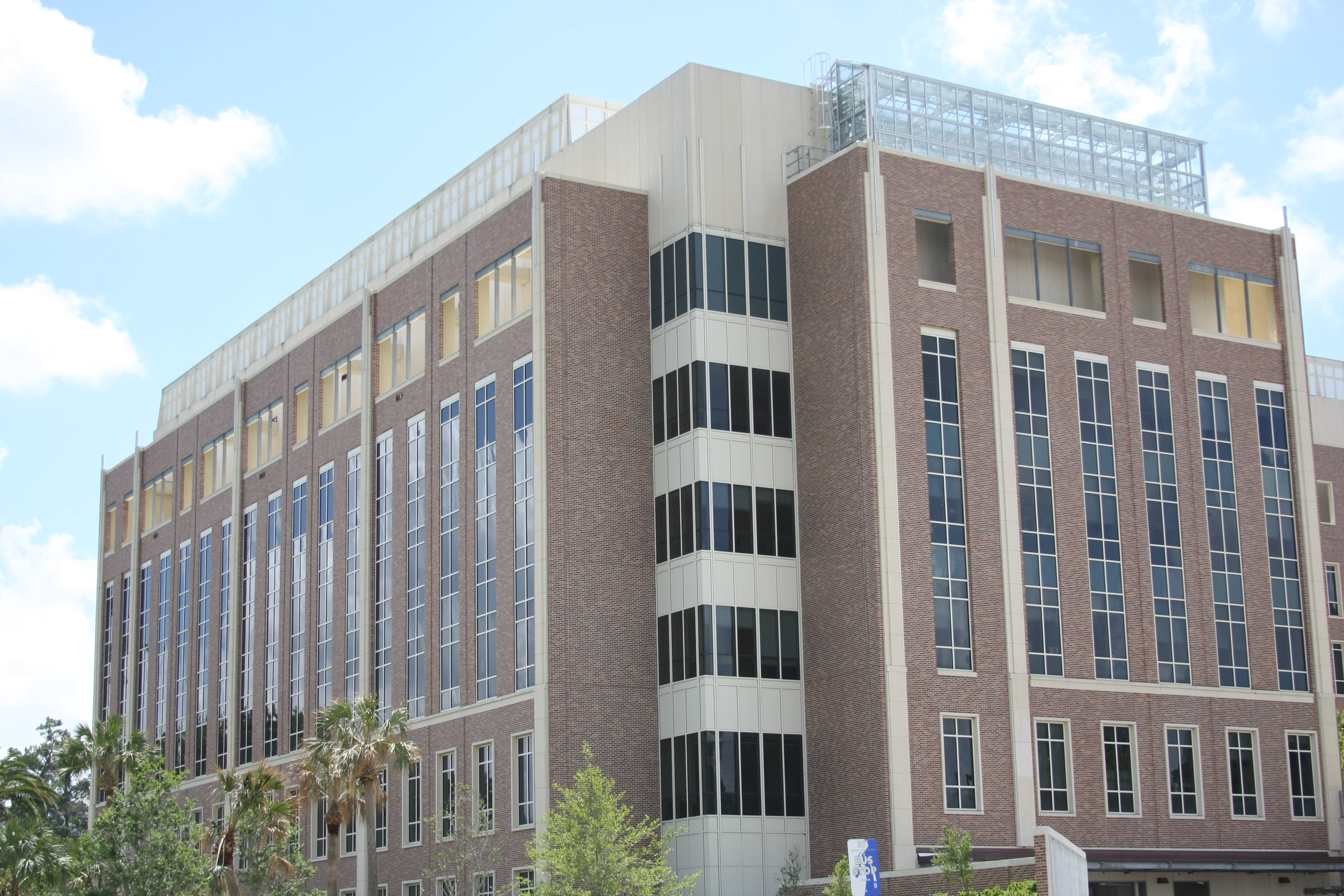
The University of Florida Cancer and Genetics Research Complex is one of several research facilities at the university

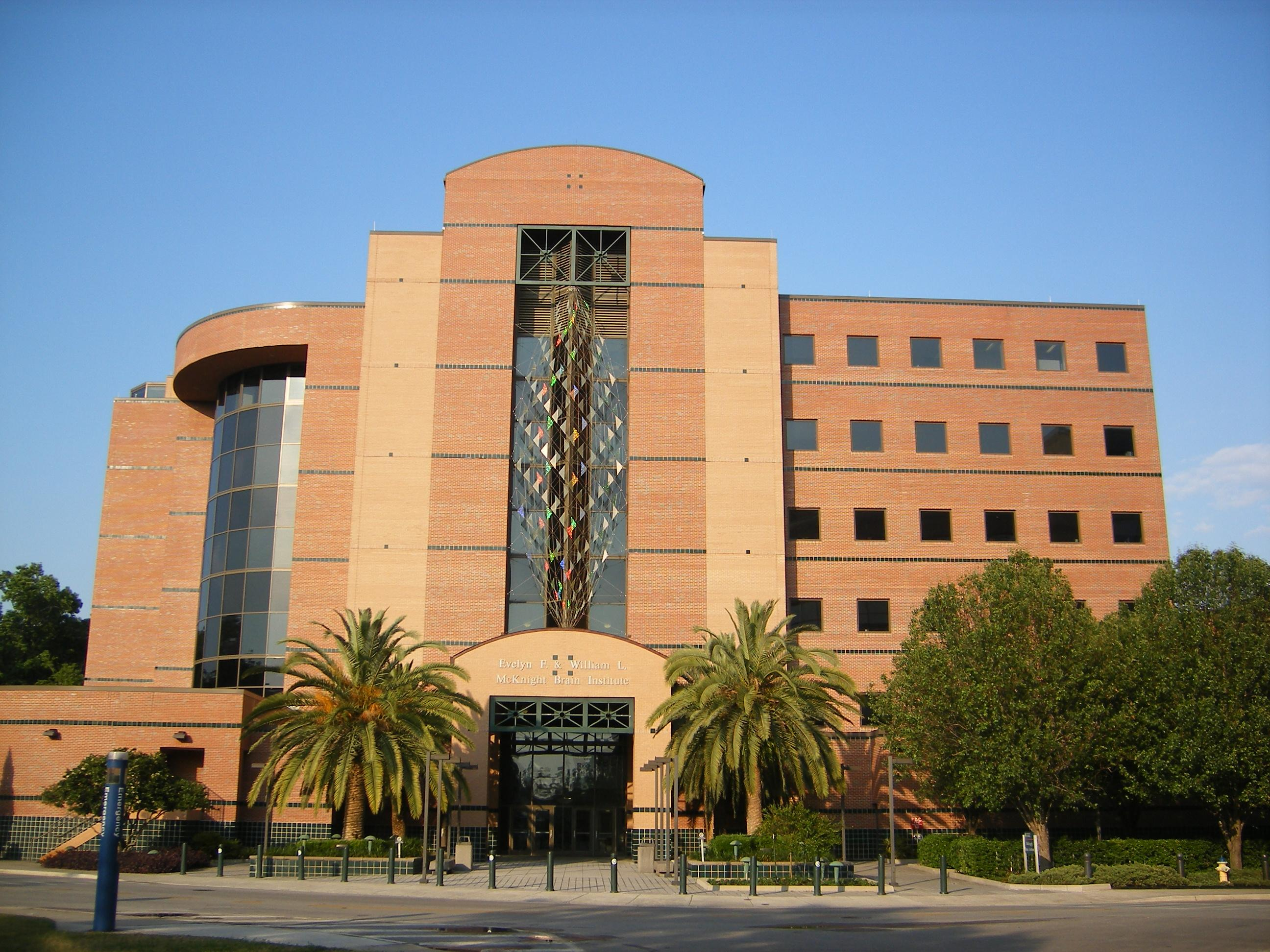
The McKnight Brain Institute at the University of Florida

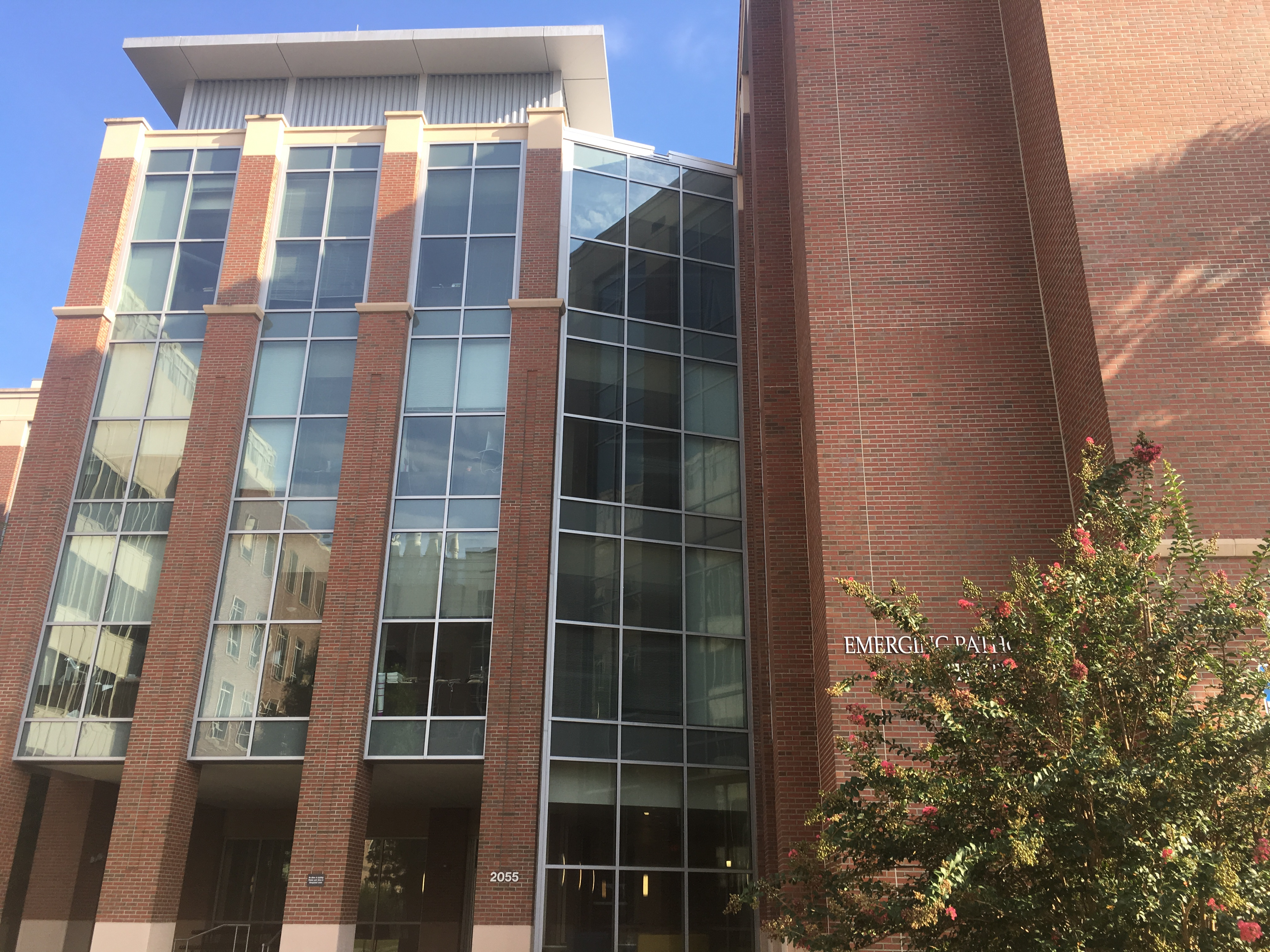
The Emerging Pathogens Institute at the University of Florida

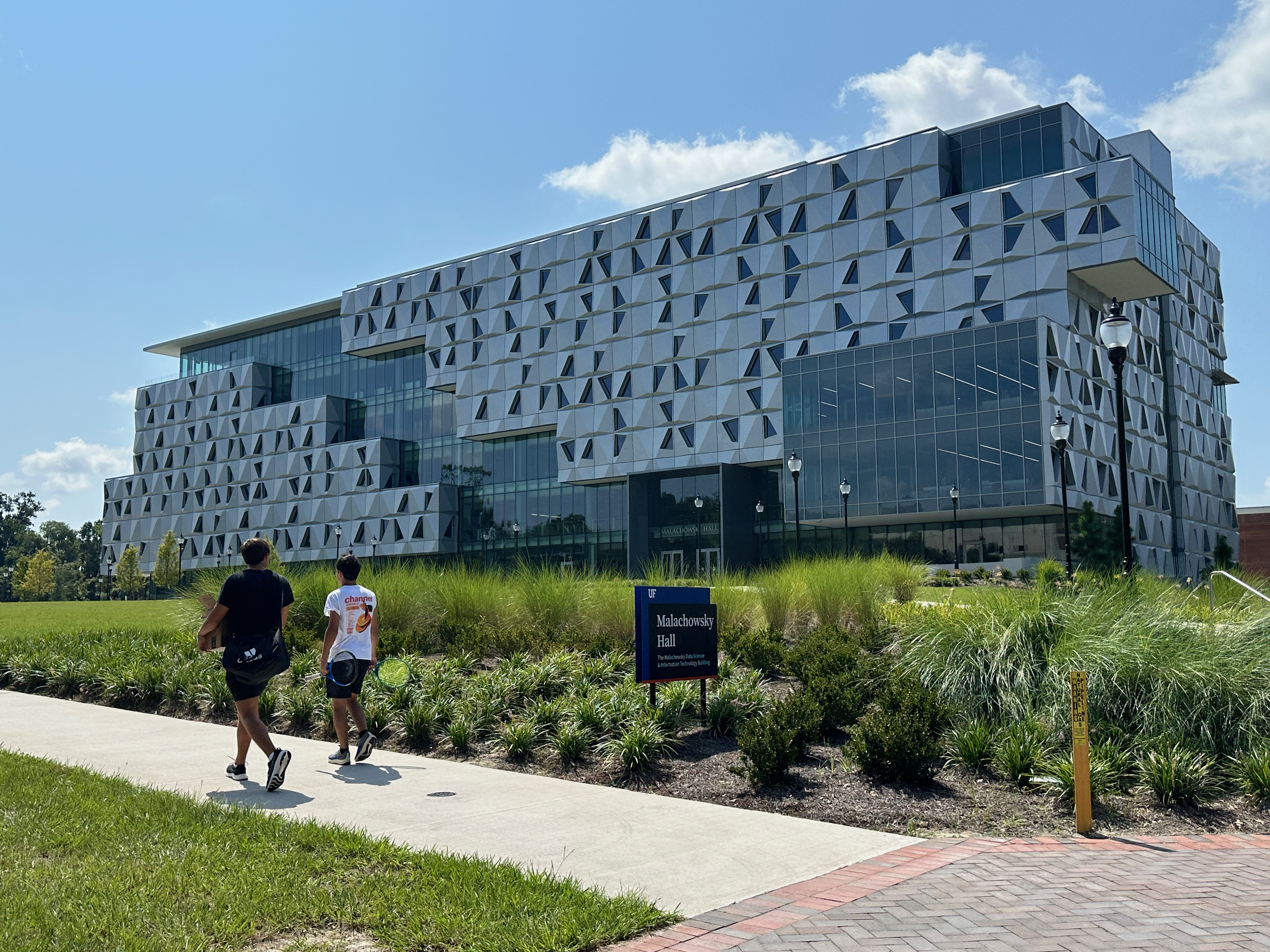
The Malachowsky Hall is home to one of the fastest university-owned supercomputer in the United States

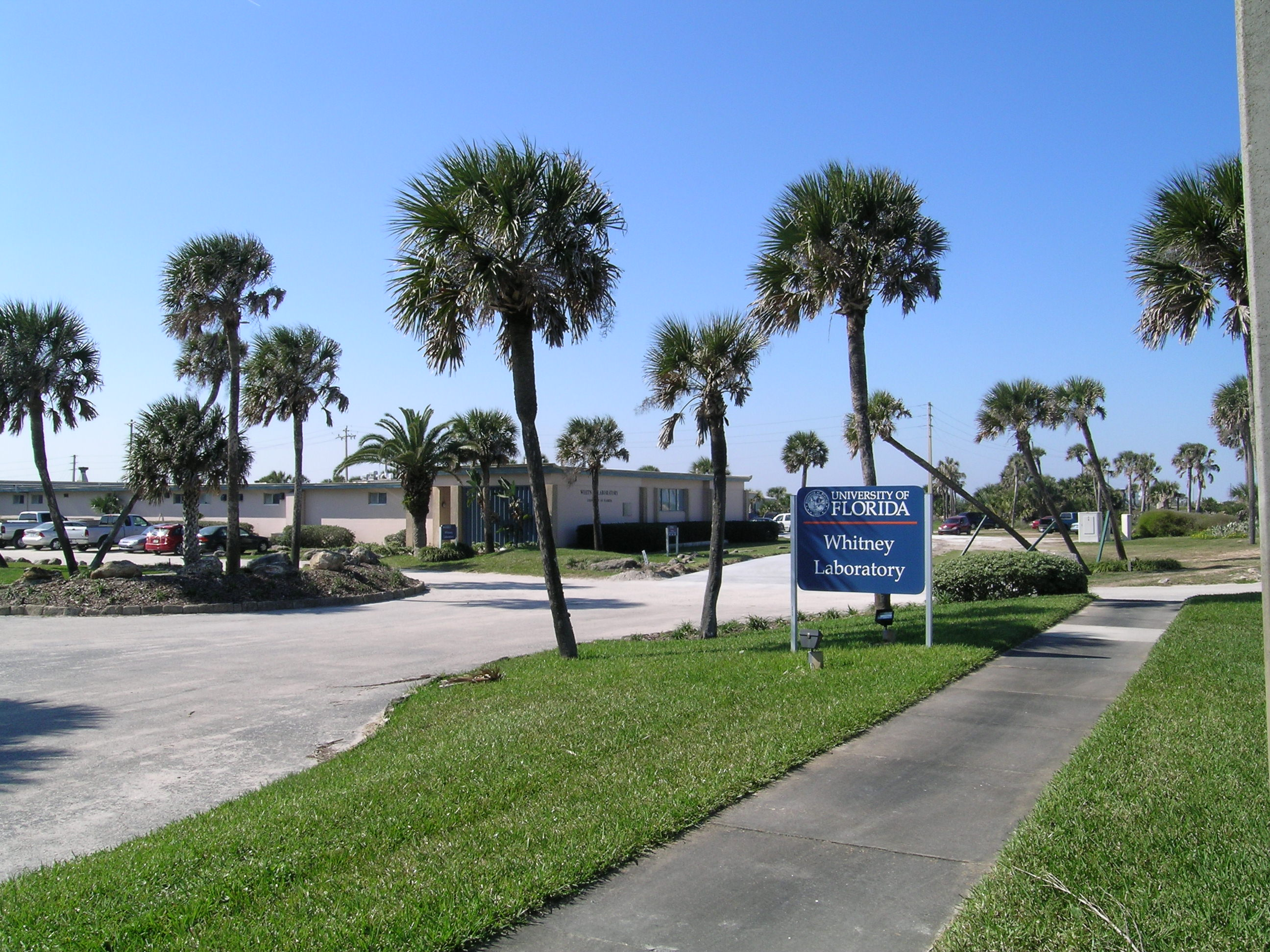
The Whitney Laboratory for Marine Bioscience, located off-campus in St. Augustine, Florida

The university spent over $1.33 billion on research and development in 2025, ranking it within the nation's Top 25 public and private universities.

According to a 2019 study by the university's Institute of Food and Agricultural Sciences, the university contributed $16.9 billion to Florida's economy and was responsible for over 130,000 jobs in the 2017–18 fiscal year. Royalty and licensing income includes the glaucoma drug Trusopt, the sports drink Gatorade, and the Sentricon termite elimination system.

UF Annual Research Expenditures per fiscal year 2015–2025
2025	US$1.33 billion
2024	US$1.26 billion
2023	US$1.25 billion
2022	US$1.08 billion
2021	US$960 million
2020	US$942 million
2019	US$776 million
2018	US$837 million
2017	US$801 million
2016	US$791 million
2015	US$740 million

Research includes diverse areas such as health-care and citrus production (the world's largest citrus research center). In 2002, Florida began leading six other universities under a $15 million NASA grant to work on space-related research during a five-year period. The university's partnership with Spain helped to create the world's largest single-aperture optical telescope in the Canary Islands (the cost was $93 million). Plans are also under way for the University of Florida to construct a 50,000-square-foot (4,600 m^{2}) research facility in collaboration with the Burnham Institute for Medical Research that will be in the center of University of Central Florida's Health Sciences Campus in Orlando, Florida. Research will include diabetes, aging, genetics and cancer.

The University of Florida also houses one of the world's leading lightning research teams. The university is also host to a nuclear research reactor known for its Neutron Activation Analysis Laboratory. In addition, the University of Florida was the first American university to receive a European Union grant to house a Jean Monnet Centre of Excellence.

The University of Florida manages or has a stake in numerous notable research centers, facilities, institutes, and projects

- Askew Institute
- Bridge Software Institute
- Cancer and Genetics Research Complex
- Cancer Hospital
- Center for African Studies
- Center for Business Ethics Education and Research
- Center for Latin American Studies
- Center for Public Service
- Emerging Pathogens Institute
- Entrepreneurship and Innovation Center
- International Center
- Floral Genome Project
- Florida Institute for Sustainable Energy
- Florida Lakewatch
- Gran Telescopio Canarias
- Infectious Disease Pharmacokinetics Laboratory
- Lake Nona Medical City
- McKnight Brain Institute
- Moffitt Cancer Center & Research Institute
- National High Magnetic Field Laboratory
- Rosemary Hill Observatory
- UF Innovate-Sid Martin Biotech
- UFHSA
- UF Training Reactor
- Whitney Laboratory for Marine Bioscience

=== Research facilities ===
As of 2012, the University of Florida had more than $750 million in new research facilities recently completed or under construction, including the Nanoscale Research Facility, the Pathogens Research Facility and the Biomedical Sciences Building. Additionally, Innovation Square, a 24/7 live/work/play research environment being developed along Southwest Second Avenue between the University of Florida campus and downtown Gainesville, recently broke ground and plans to open next fall. The university's Office of Technology Licensing will relocate to Innovation Square, joining Florida Innovation Hub, a business "super-incubator" designed to promote the development of new high-tech companies based on the university's research programs. Innovation Square will include retail space, restaurants and local businesses, and residential space.

=== Participation in the Large Hadron Collider ===
A team of UF physicists has a leading role in one of the two major experiments planned for the Large Hadron Collider, a 17-mile (27 km)-long, $5 billion, super-cooled tunnel outside Geneva, Switzerland. More than 30 university physicists, postdoctoral associates, graduate students and now undergraduates are involved in the collider's Compact Muon Solenoid (CMS) experiment, one of its two major experiments. About 10 are stationed in Geneva. The group is the largest from any university in the U.S. to participate in the CMS experiment. The UF team designed and oversaw development of a major detector within the CMS. The detector, the Muon system, is intended to capture subatomic particles called muons, which are heavier cousins of electrons. Among other efforts, UF scientists analyzed about 100 of the 400 detector chambers placed within the Muon system to be sure they were functioning properly. Scientists from the University of Florida group played a central role in the discovery of the Higgs particle. The bulk of the UF research was funded by the U.S. Department of Energy.

=== Partnership with Zhejiang University ===
In July 2008, the University of Florida teamed up with the Zhejiang University to research sustainable solutions to the Earth's energy issues. Overall a Joint Research Center of Clean Sustainable Energy among the Florida Institute for Sustainable Energy, at UF, and the State Key Lab of Clean Energy Utilization and the Institute for Thermal Power Engineering, at Zhejiang University will collaborate to work on this pressing issue.

=== The International Center for Lightning Research and Testing ===
Florida has more lightning than any other U.S. state. UF sponsors the International Center for Lightning Research and Testing (ICLRT), which occupies over 100 acres (40 ha) at the Camp Blanding Army National Guard Base, about 25 miles (40 km) northeast of UF's campus in Gainesville, Florida. One of their primary research tools is lightning initiation from overhead thunderclouds, using the triggered lightning rocket-and-wire technique. Small sounding rockets, connected to long copper wires, are fired into likely lightning storm cumulonimbus clouds. When the rocket—or its wire—is struck by lightning, the passing of the high-voltage lightning strike down the wire vaporizes it as the lightning travels to the ground. Undergraduate and graduate research in UF's Department of Electrical and Computer Engineering's Lightning Research Group is used to increase new fundamental knowledge about lightning-based phenomena.

== UF Health ==
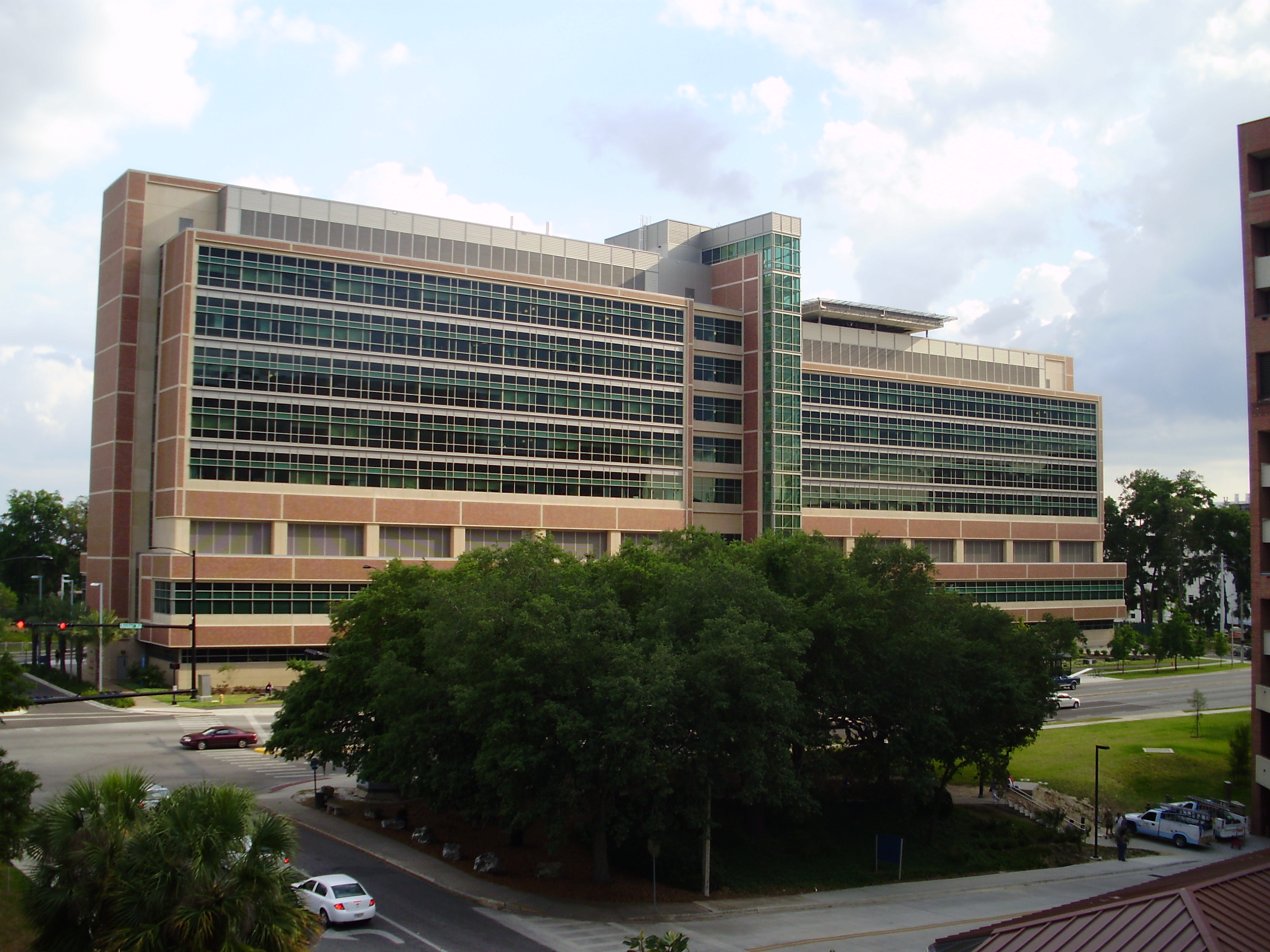
The UF Health Shands Cancer Hospital at the University of Florida

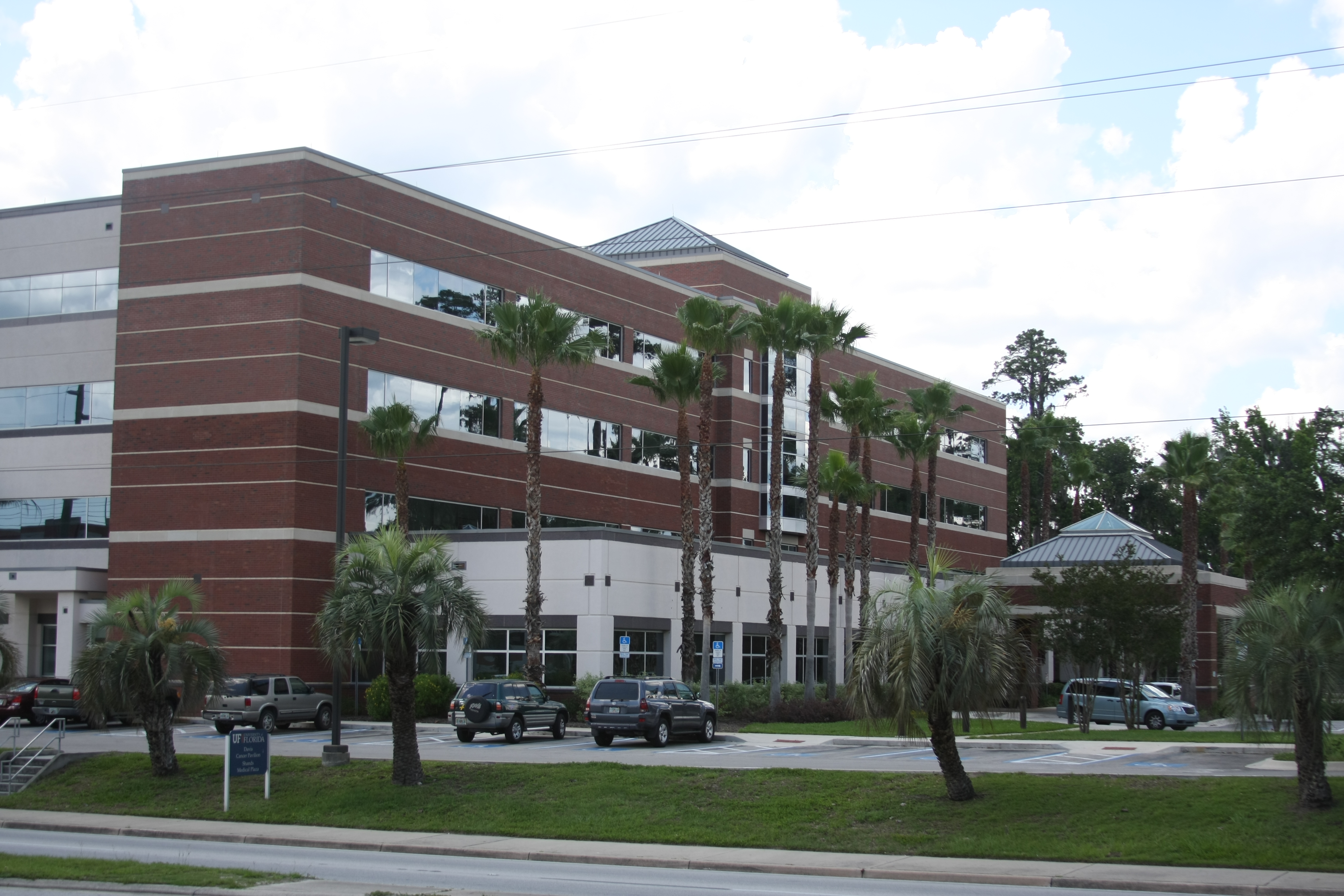
The UF Health Medical Plaza is an outpatient medical building, located west of the UF Health Shands Hospital

University of Florida Health has two campuses: Gainesville and Jacksonville. It includes two teaching hospitals and two specialty hospitals, as well as the colleges of Dentistry, Medicine, Nursing, Pharmacy, Public Health and Health Professions, and Veterinary Medicine, including a large animal hospital and a small animal hospital. The system also encompasses six UF research institutes: the Clinical and Translational Science Institute, the Evelyn F. and William L. McKnight Brain Institute, the Genetics Institute, the UF Health Cancer Center, the Institute on Aging and the Emerging Pathogens Institute. UF Health is the only academic health center in the United States with six health-related colleges on a single, contiguous campus.

Patient-care services are provided through the private, not-for-profit UF Health Shands family of hospitals and programs. UF Health Shands Hospital in Gainesville includes UF Health Shands Children's Hospital and UF Health Shands Cancer Hospital. The specialty hospitals, UF Health Shands Rehab Hospital and UF Health Shands Psychiatric Hospital, are also in Gainesville. UF Health Jacksonville is the system's northeast Florida center.

UF Health has a network of outpatient rehabilitation centers, UF Health Rehab Centers, and two home-health agencies, UF Health Shands HomeCare; as well as more than 80 UF physician outpatient practices in north central and northeast Florida. UF Health is affiliated with the Veterans Affairs hospitals in Gainesville and North Florida/South Georgia.

In all, more than 7,000 students are enrolled in all six UF Health colleges (as of 2021). The Evelyn F. and William L. McKnight Brain Institute is also part of the Health Science Center and is the most comprehensive program of its kind in the world. The institute comprises 300 faculty members from 10 colleges, and 51 departments campus-wide.

The University of Florida is a winner of the National Institutes of Health Clinical and Translational Science Award and member of the NIH national consortium of medical research institutions. In December 2018 Expertscape recognized it as #4 in the world for expertise in Diabetes Mellitus Type 1.

=== UF Health Jacksonville ===
UF Health Jacksonville is an academic health center with three UF colleges, Medicine, Nursing and Pharmacy, as well as a network of primary and specialty care centers in northeast Florida and southeast Georgia.

=== UF Health Cancer Center at Orlando Health ===
In 2010, Orlando Health and UF Health teamed up to form joint clinical programs in the areas of pediatrics, neuroscience, oncology, women's health, transplantation and cardiovascular medicine. The partnership provides undergraduate and graduate medical residency and fellowship training opportunities at Orlando Health, and will allow Orlando Health physicians and patients to be part of clinical trials through UF's clinical research program.

UF Health Cancer Center at Orlando Health launched in January 2014. The center focuses on developing safe, individualized molecular-based targeted oncology therapies to improve patient outcomes in Florida. The joint oncology program offers clinical trial collaborations and comprehensive cancer services customized to the patient by combining physicians and the collective strengths of UF Health and Orlando Health.

== Student life ==
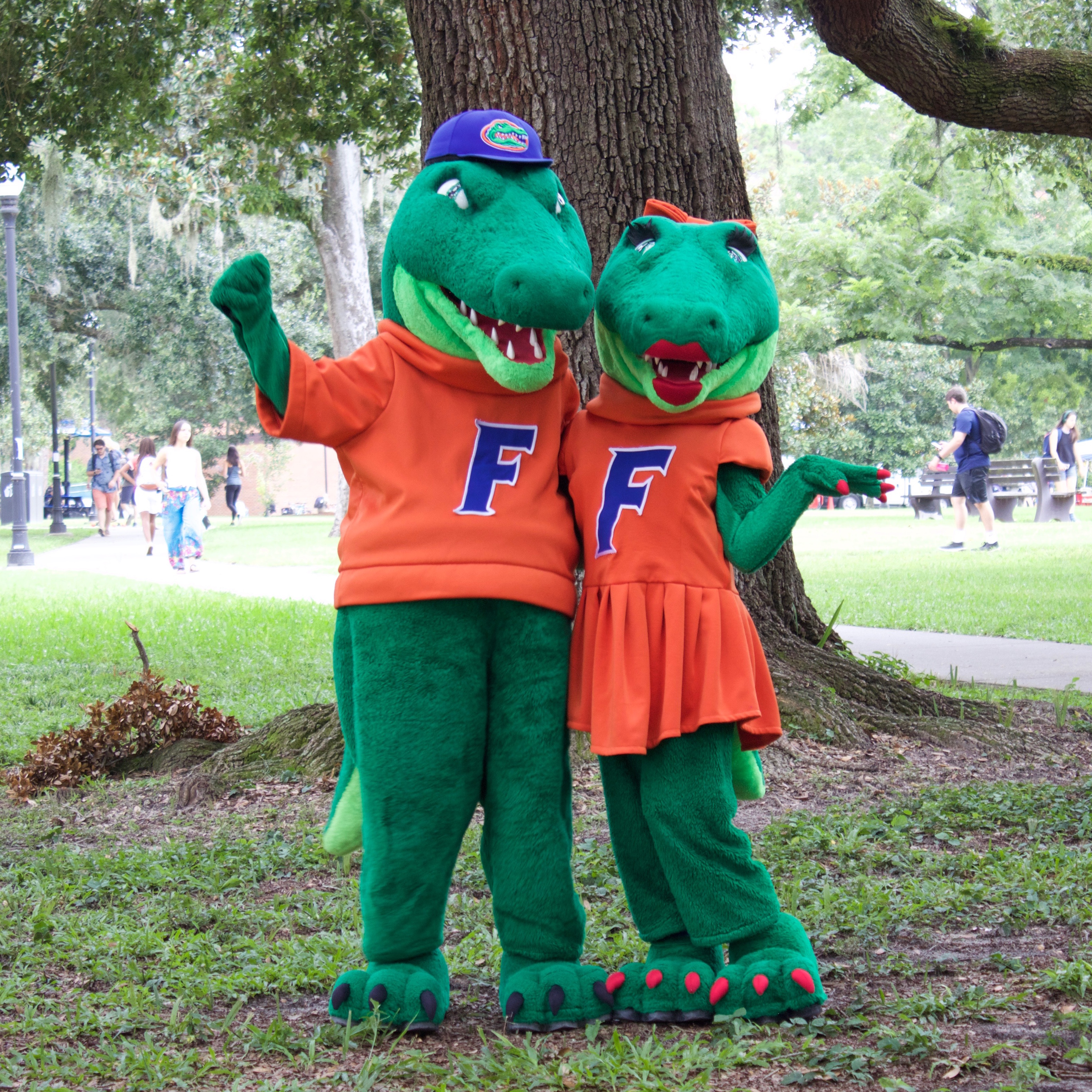
Albert and Alberta Gator are the official mascots of the University of Florida

=== PaCE ===
Launched in 2015, the Pathway to Campus Enrollment (PaCE) program offers an alternative route for students who meet the University of Florida's standard freshman admission requirements, in response to high demand and limited on-campus space. The program is available for select majors, and students complete transition requirements specific to their chosen major before beginning on-campus courses. Through PaCE, students are required to complete at least 60 credit hours, including all prerequisite and transition requirements, before moving to on-campus learning. Of those credits, at least 15 must be completed through UF Online, and students must spend a minimum of two semesters in the online format. The University of Florida admitted 2,420 students to PaCE for the class of 2021.

=== Innovation Academy ===
The Innovation Academy (IA) at the University of Florida is a program that allows students to integrate a focus on innovation, creativity, leadership, and entrepreneurship with their chosen major. Students participate in spring and summer semesters on campus, which allows them to pursue internships, study abroad opportunities, and other experiential learning programs during the fall. The program offers more than 25 majors, all of which include a common minor in Innovation, and is designed to provide students with interdisciplinary training that complements their primary field of study. IA aims to prepare students for careers in emerging fields and leadership roles by combining practical experience with academic study in innovation and entrepreneurship.

=== Greek Life ===
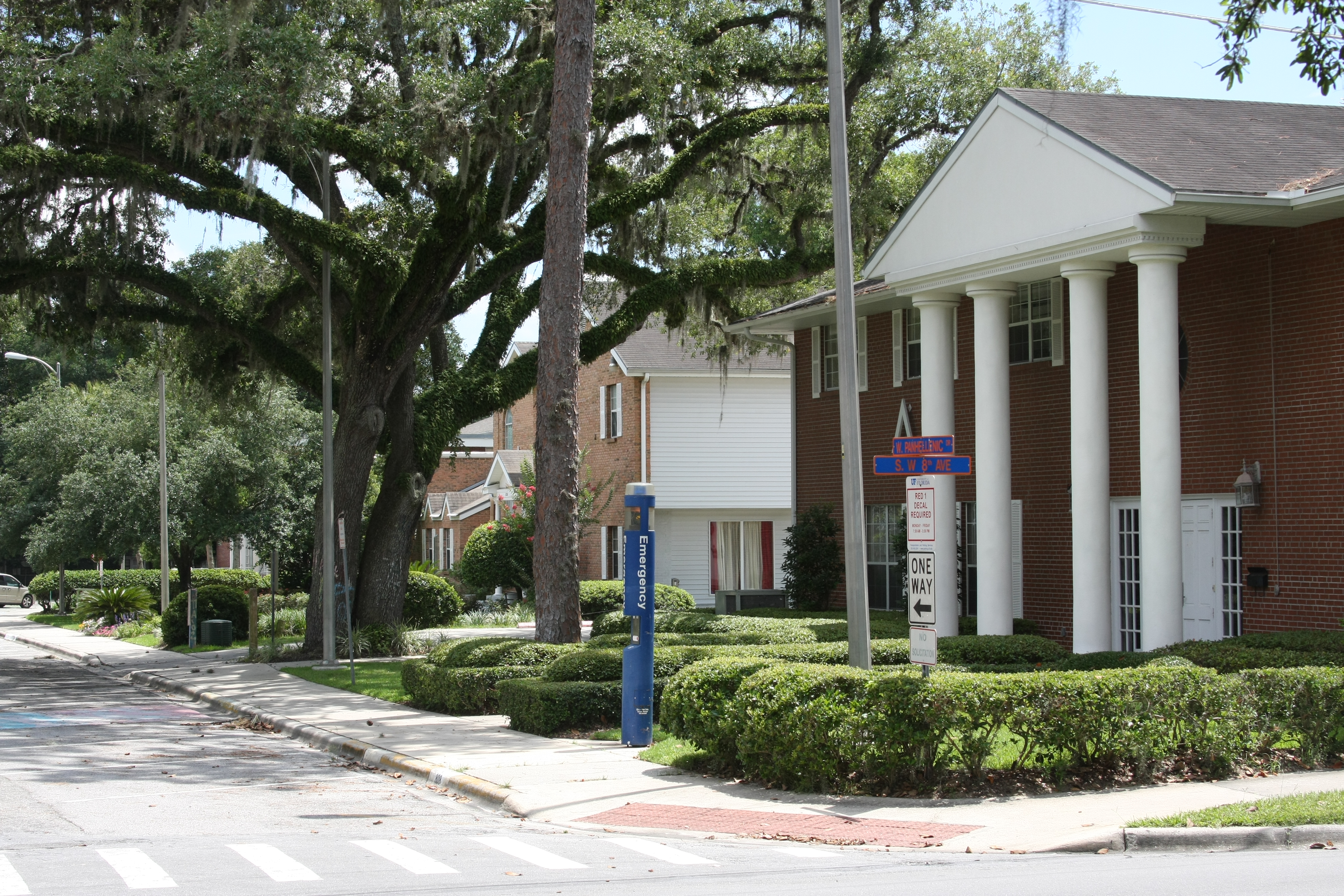
Sorority row at the University of Florida

Greek life is a prominent component of student life at the University of Florida, with approximately 5,200 undergraduate students, or about 15 percent of the student body, participating in fraternities or sororities. The university currently hosts 25 fraternities and 18 sororities, many of which are affiliated with national organizations and governed by councils including the Interfraternity Council, Panhellenic Council, National Pan-Hellenic Council, and Multicultural Greek Council. Some fraternity chapters predate the university's relocation to Gainesville, with the first chapters chartered in 1884 at one of UF's predecessor institutions in Lake City. Members often reside in chapter houses or participate in university-recognized living communities, and recruitment occurs according to formalized spring and fall periods. On UF's campus there are 23 houses that belong to chapters of the Interfraternity Council and 18 houses that belong to the Panhellenic Council. There are no chapter facilities for the National Pan-Hellenic Council or Multicultural Greek Council chapters. UF's Greek system is notable within the Southeastern Conference for its size and level of student involvement, reflecting the broader prominence of fraternities and sororities in the region.

=== Dance Marathon at UF ===
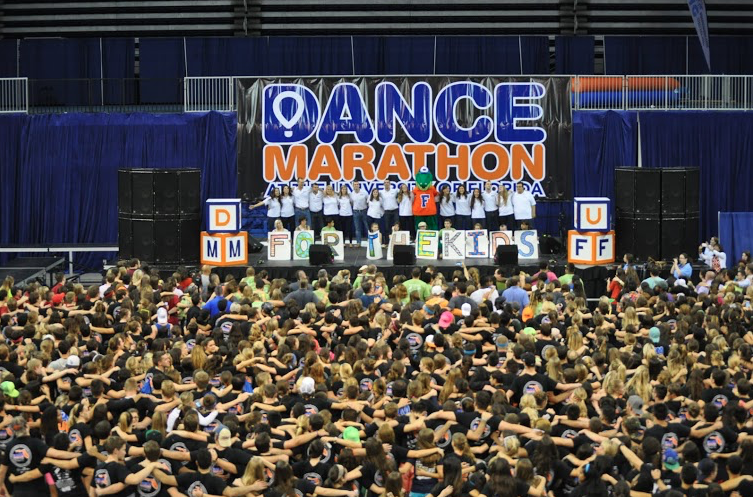
Dance Marathon in 2014

Dance Marathon at UF is an annual 26.2-hour event benefiting the patients of University of Florida Health Shands Children's Hospital in Gainesville, Florida. Each year, more than 800 students stay awake and on their feet to raise money and awareness for Children's Miracle Network Hospitals. In the 33 years of Dance Marathon at UF's existence, more than $33 million has been donated, making it the most successful student-run philanthropy in the southeastern United States. In 2019, DM at UF raised a record total of $3,230,025.23 for UF Health Shands Children's Hospital, becoming the second most successful Dance Marathon in the nation. DM at UF donates 100% of the money raised to UF Health Shands Children's Hospital, where 42% goes to research, 10% to education, and 42% to patient care.

=== Reserve Officer Training Corps ===
The University of Florida Reserve Officer Training Corps is the official officer training and commissioning program at the University of Florida. Officially founded in 1905, it is one of the oldest such programs in the nation.

The Reserve Officer Training Corps offers commissions for the United States Army, United States Navy, United States Marine Corps, and the United States Air Force. The unit is one of the oldest in the nation, and is at Van Fleet Hall.

=== Housing ===
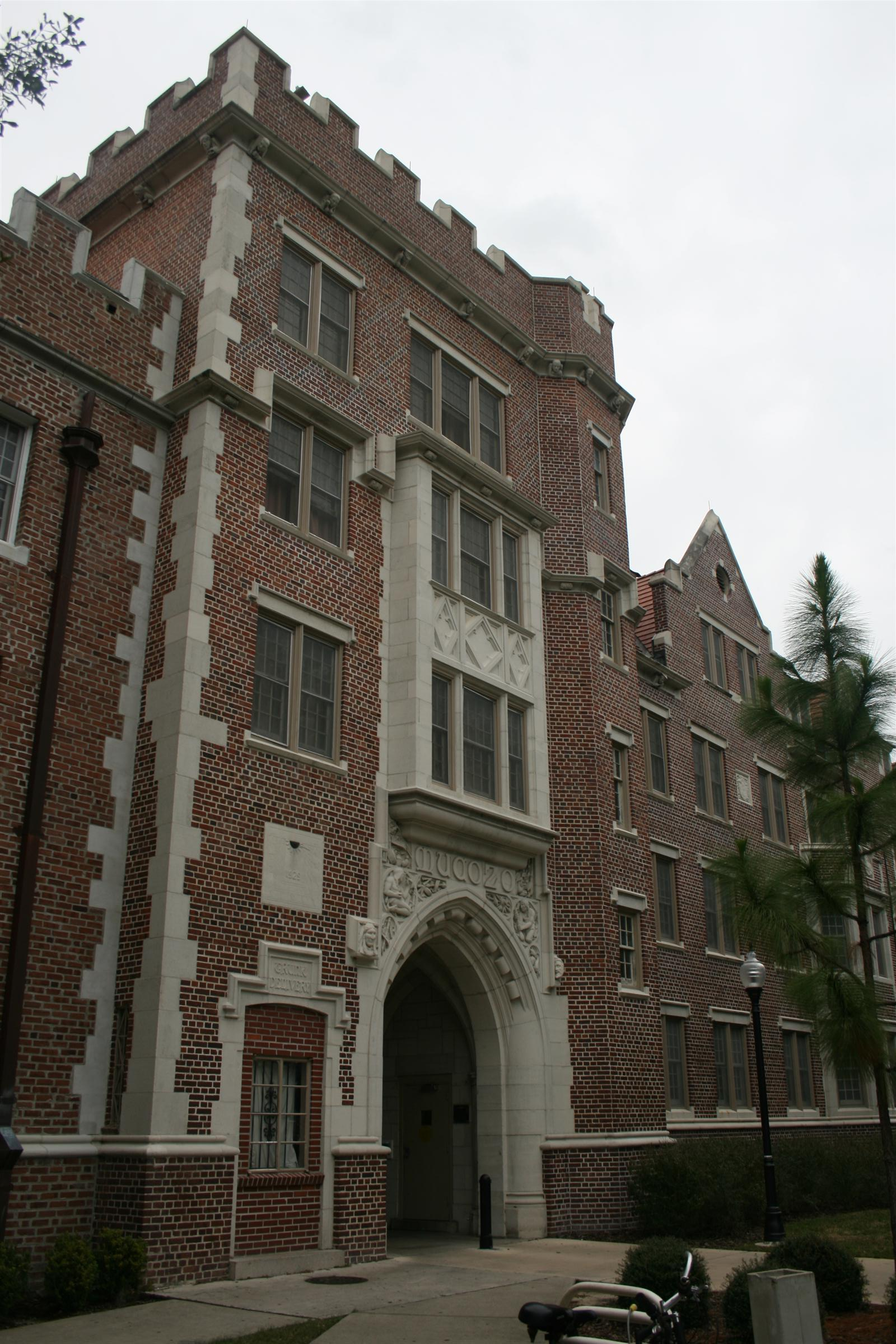
Sledd Hall, built in 1929, is an example of a UF dormitory designed in the Collegiate Gothic style

The University of Florida provides over 9,200 students with housing in residence halls and complexes on the eastern and western sides of campus.

=== Recreation and fitness on campus ===
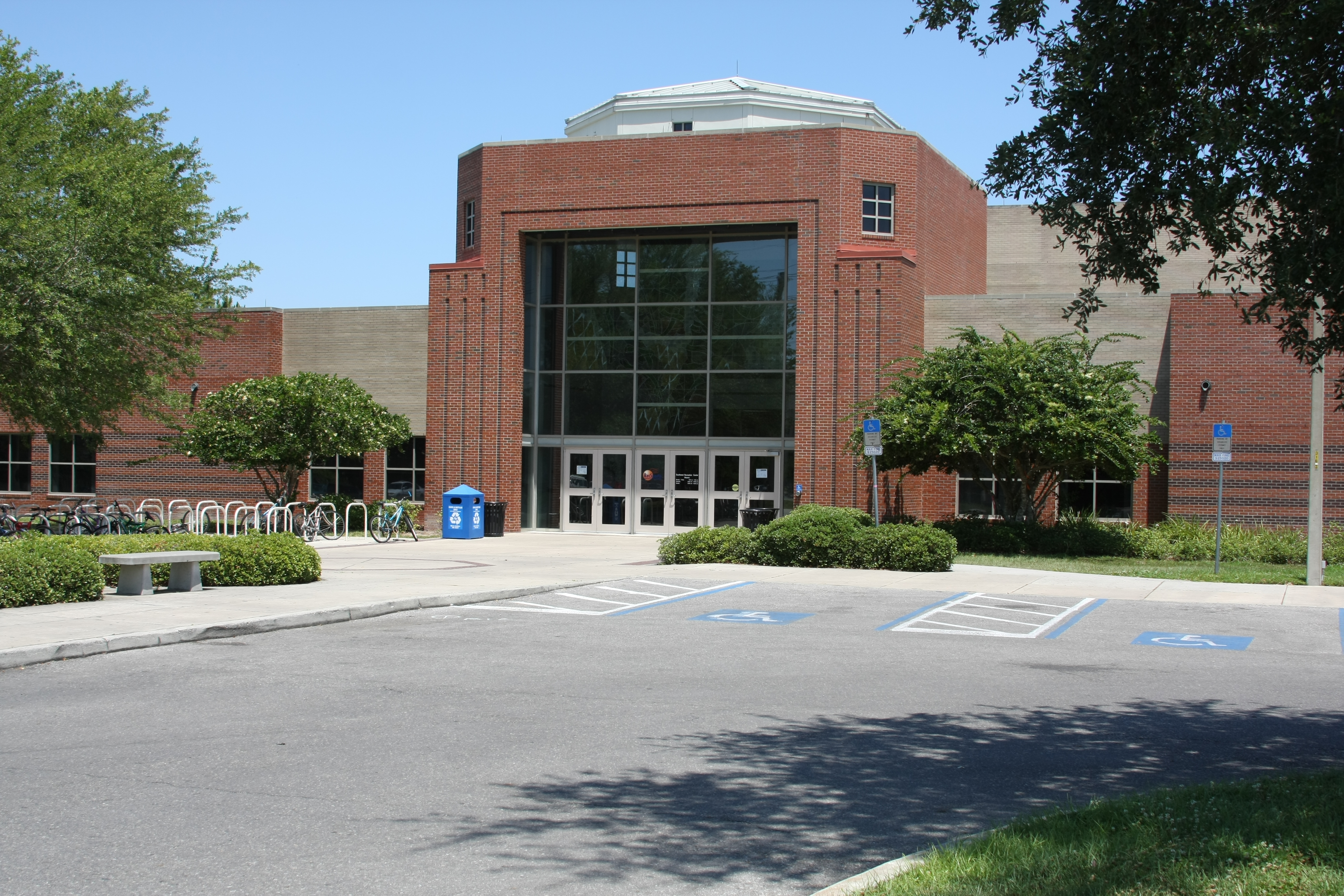
Southwest Recreation Center

The University of Florida's Department of Recreational Sports (RecSports) includes operation of two lake-front parks at Lake Wauburg, group fitness, personal and small group training, massage therapy, intramural sports, 51 competitive sports clubs, two world-class indoor fitness and recreation facilities, four campus pools, outdoor rock climbing, an adventure travel recreation program, campus fields and facilities, a skate park and staff development services for over 700 students who are employed by the department's programs.

RecSports manages the University of Florida Southwest Recreation Center, a 140,000-square-foot (13,000 m^{2}) state-of-the-art facility with six indoor basketball courts, a split-level cardio room, personal training studio, massage therapy rooms, 14,000-square-foot (1,300 m^{2}) strength and conditioning area and a social lounge with a smoothie bar. Other campus facilities operated by RecSports include the Student Recreation & Fitness Center.

Outside of RecSports, campus recreation options include an arts and crafts center, bowling alley and game room—all in the J. Wayne Reitz Union, and the Mark Bostick Golf Course. The campus also contains nature trails, open spaces, small ponds, picnic areas, shady nooks and an 81-acre (330,000 m^{2}) wildlife sanctuary. The UF Scientific Diver Development Program provides SCUBA training for students interested in pursuing a career involving underwater research.

=== Student government ===
The University of Florida Student Government is the governing body of students who attend the University of Florida, representing the university's nearly 60,000 undergraduate, graduate and professional students. The university's student government operates on a yearly $22.5 million budget (2023-2024 fiscal year), one of the largest student government budgets in the United States, and the money is allocated by the Budget and Appropriations Committee of the Student Senate. The student government was established in 1909 and consists of executive, judicial and unicameral legislative branches.

=== Alma mater ===
Milton Yeats composed University of Florida's alma mater in 1925.

=== Campus and area transportation ===
The university campus is served by nine bus routes of the Gainesville Regional Transit System (RTS). Students, faculty, and staff with university-issued ID cards are able to use the system for no additional fee. RTS also provides other campus services, including Gator Aider (during football games), S.N.A.P, and Later Gator nighttime service.

The Gainesville region and the university are served by the Gainesville Regional Airport, which is in northeast Gainesville and has daily flights to Dallas, Atlanta, and Charlotte.

=== Student media ===
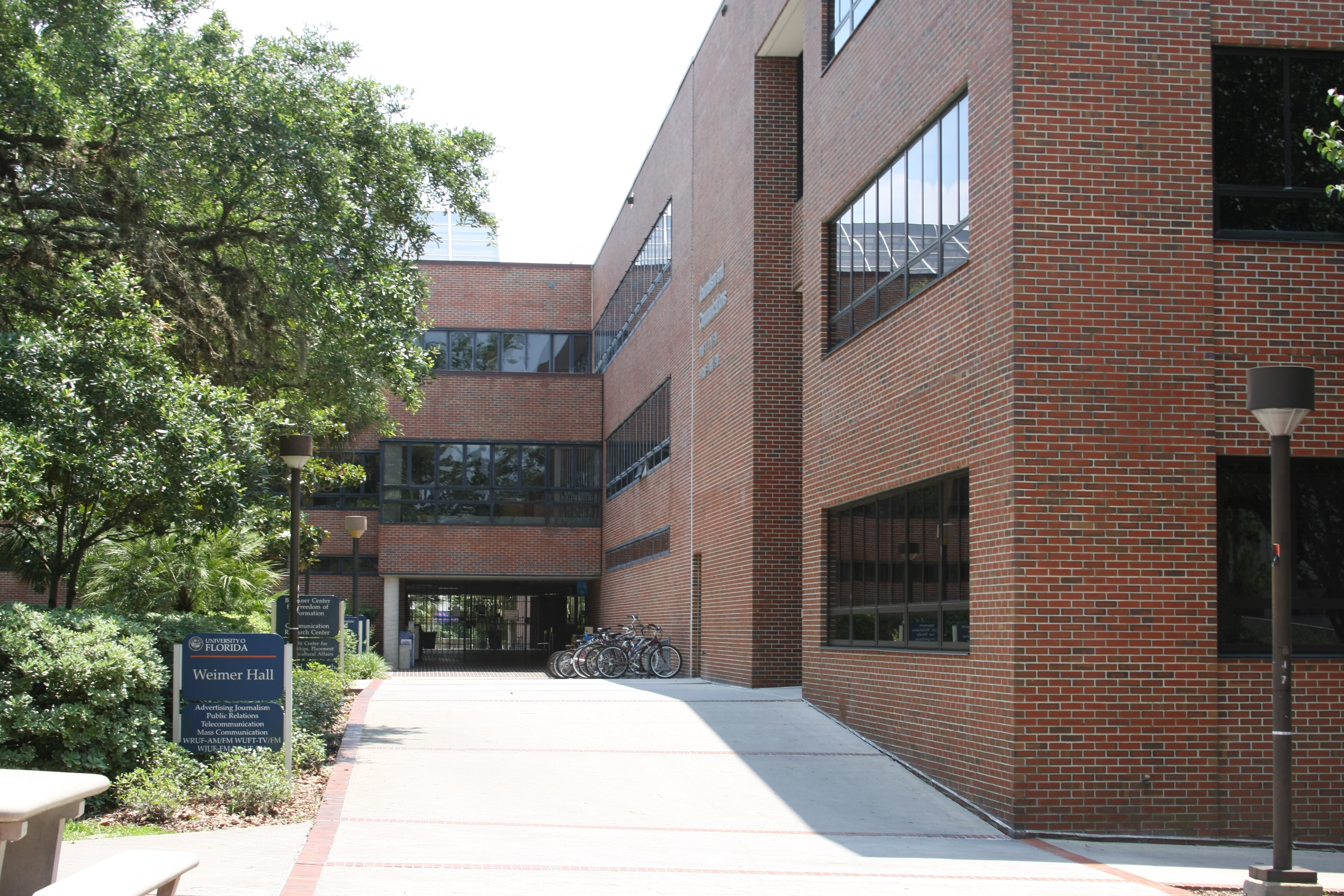
Weimer Hall home to many of the studios of the campus stations

The University of Florida community includes six major student-run media outlets and companion Web sites.

- The Independent Florida Alligator is the largest student-run newspaper in the United States, and operates without oversight from the university administration.
- The Really Independent Florida Crocodile, a parody of The Alligator, is a monthly magazine started by students.
- Tea Literary & Arts Magazine is UF's student-run undergraduate literary and arts publication, established in 1995.
- WRUF (850 AM and 95.3 FM) (www.wruf.com) includes ESPN programming, local sports news and talk programming produced by the station's professional staff and the latest local sports news produced by the college's Innovation News Center.
- WRUF-FM (103.7 FM) broadcasts country music and attracts an audience from the Gainesville and Ocala areas.
- WRUF-LD is a low-power television station that carries weather, news, and sports programming.
- WUFT (www.wuft.org) is a PBS member station with a variety of programming that includes a daily student-produced newscast.
- WUFT-FM (89.1 FM) is an NPR member radio station which airs news and public affairs programming, including student-produced long-form news reporting. WUFT-FM's programming also airs on WJUF-FM (90.1). In addition, WUFT offers 24-hour classical/arts programming on 92.1.

Various other journals and magazines are published by the university's academic units and student groups, including the Bob Graham Center-affiliated Florida Political Review and the literary journal Subtropics. In 2023, the social media app TikTok was banned from use across all Florida state universities.

== Athletics ==
Sports at Florida

Men's Baseball Basketball Cross country Football Golf Swimming Tennis Track & field	Women's Basketball Cross country Golf Gymnastics Lacrosse Soccer Softball Swimming Tennis Track & field Volleyball

For individual articles on the Florida Gators team in each sport, see the table at right.

The University of Florida's intercollegiate sports teams, known as the "Florida Gators," compete in National Collegiate Athletic Association (NCAA) Division I primarily in the Southeastern Conference (SEC). The Gators compete in nine men's sports and twelve women's sports.

For the 2014–15 school year, the University Athletic Association budgeted more $100 million for its sports teams and facilities. Since 1987–88, the Gators have won twenty-three of the last twenty-six SEC All-Sports Trophies, recognizing Florida as the best overall athletics program in the SEC. Florida is the only program in the nation to finish among the nation's top ten in each of the last thirty national all-sports standings and is the only SEC school to place 100 or more student-athletes on the Academic Honor Roll each of the last fifteen years.

The Florida Gators have won forty-nine national team championships, forty-four of which are NCAA championships. Florida Gators athletes have also won 367 NCAA championships in individual sports events. Florida is the only Division I program to have won three or more titles in both men's basketball (2006, 2007, 2025) and football (1996, 2006, 2008), as well as the only Division I program to hold both the men's basketball title and football title simultaneously in the modern era.

=== Football ===
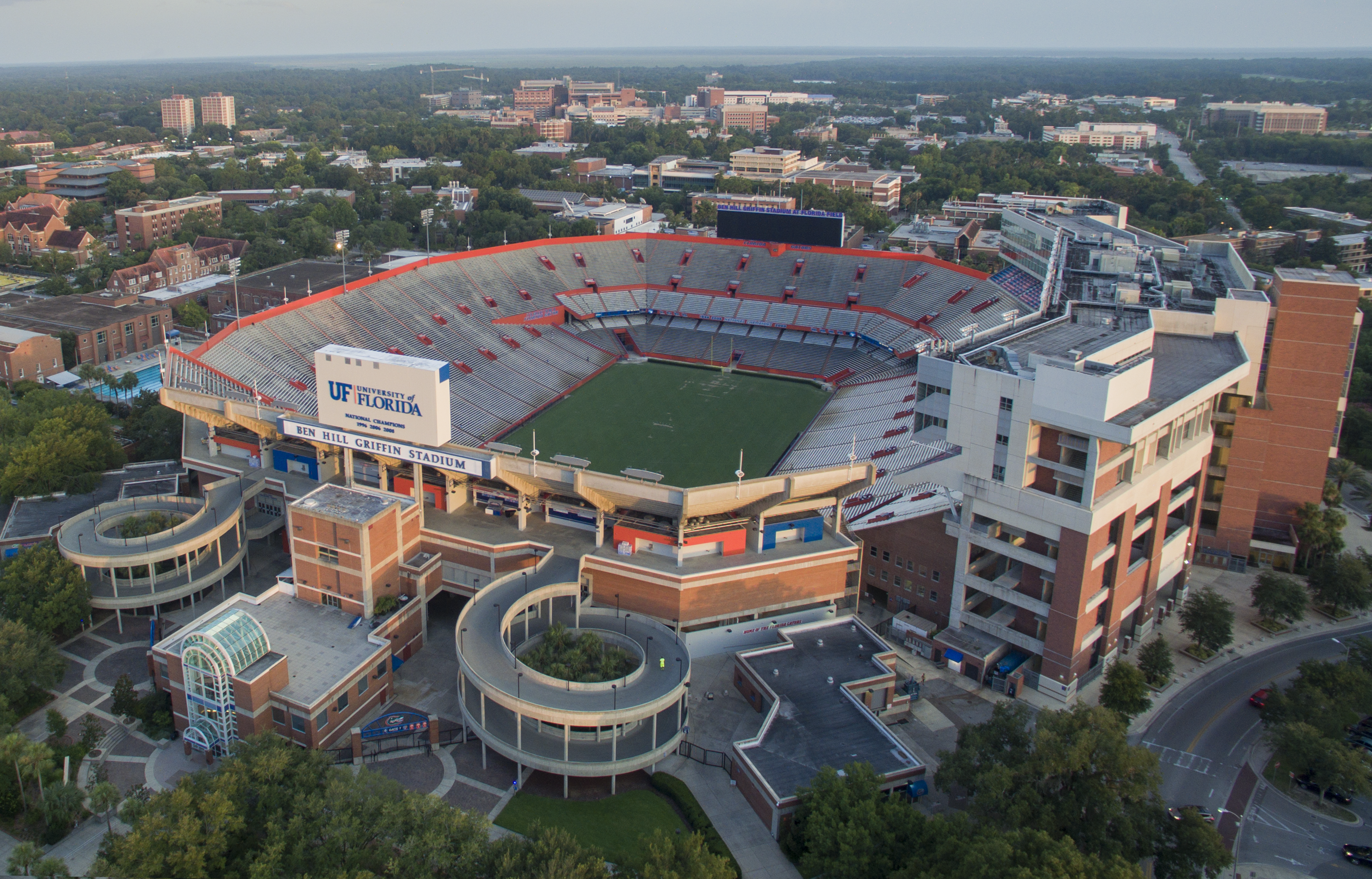
Aerial of Ben Hill Griffin Stadium, also known as "The Swamp."

The University of Florida fielded its first official varsity football team in the fall of 1906, when the university held its first classes on its new Gainesville campus. Since then, the Florida Gators football team has played in 40 bowl games, won three consensus national championships and eight Southeastern Conference (SEC) championships, produced 89 first-team All-Americans, 45 National Football League (NFL) first-round draft choices, and three Heisman Trophy winners.

The Gators won their first post-season game on January 1, 1953, beating Tulsa 14–13 in Jacksonville, Florida. The Gators' first major bowl win was the 1967 Orange Bowl in which coach Ray Graves and Heisman Trophy quarterback Steve Spurrier led the Gators to a 27–12 victory over the Georgia Tech Yellow Jackets.

In the 1980s, Gators football coach Charlie Pell became the target of disdain by University of Miami football coach Howard Schnellenberger and Florida State football coach Bobby Bowden, who equally despised Pell because of his notoriously bad attitude. Their mutual hatred of Pell made the Hurricanes-Seminoles rivalry earn the nickname of "The Friendly Rivalry."

In 1990, Spurrier returned to his alma mater as its new head coach, and spurred the Gators to their first six official SEC football championships. The Gators, quarterbacked by their second Heisman Trophy winner, Danny Wuerffel, won their first national championship in 1996 with a 52–20 victory over Florida State Seminoles in the Sugar Bowl. In 2006, Urban Meyer coached the Gators to a 13–1 record, capturing their seventh SEC Championship, and defeating the top-ranked Ohio State Buckeyes 41–14 for the BCS National Championship. In 2008, the Gators' third Heisman-winning quarterback, Tim Tebow, led them in a 24–14 BCS Championship Game victory over the Oklahoma Sooners for the team's third national championship.

Since 1930, the Gators' home field has been Florida Field at Ben Hill Griffin Stadium, which seats 88,548 fans. The stadium is popularly known as "The Swamp".

=== Basketball ===
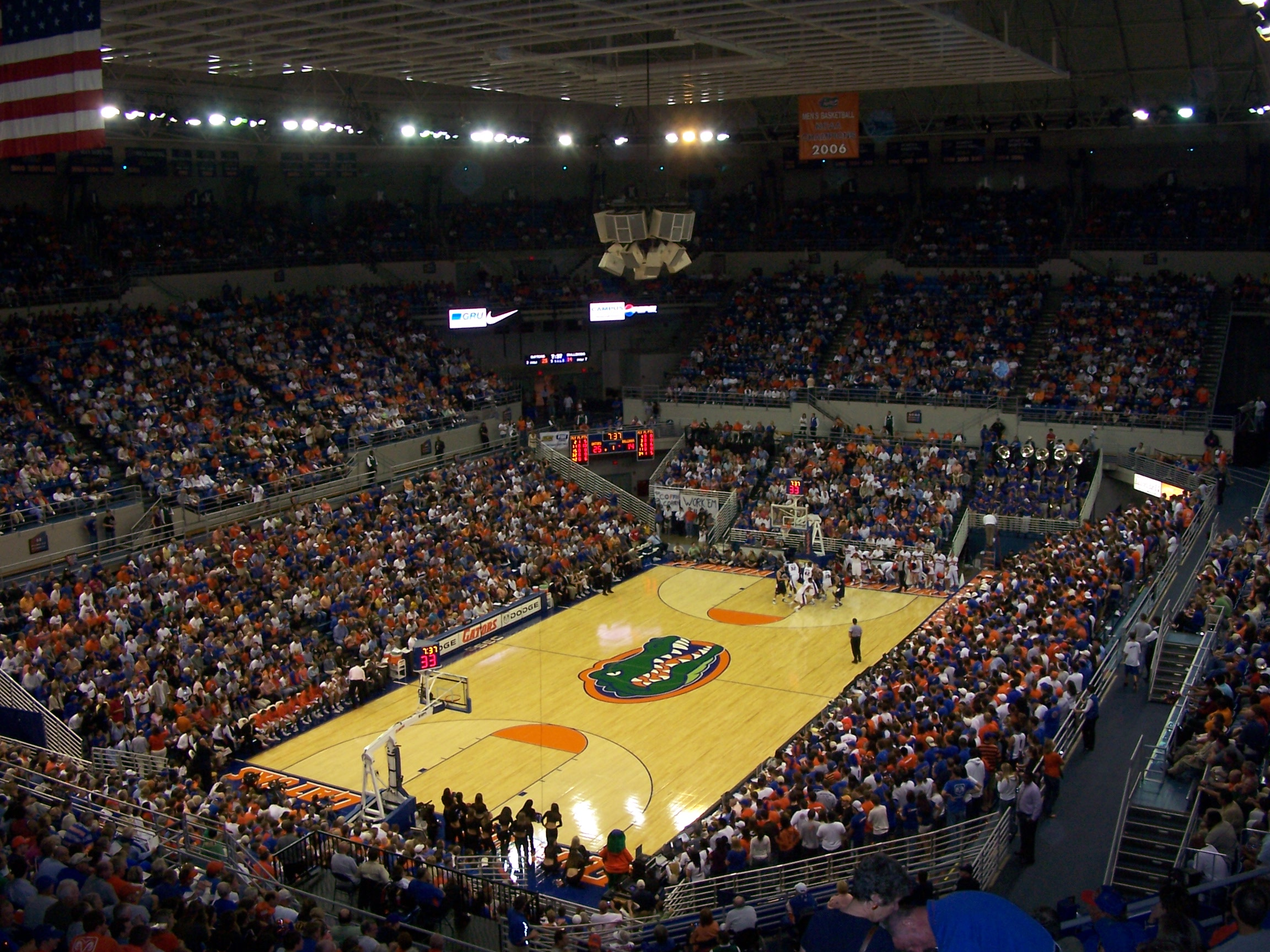
Interior view of the O'Connell Center, configured for basketball

Center Neal Walk is the only Gator to have had his number retired by the basketball team. The Florida Gators men's basketball team has also gained national recognition over the past 20 years. The Gators went to the Final Four of the 1994 NCAA tournament under coach Lon Kruger, and coach Billy Donovan led the Gators back to the NCAA Final Four in 2000, losing to the Michigan State Spartans in the final. Under Donovan, the Gators won their first Southeastern Conference (SEC) tournament championship in 2005, beating the Kentucky Wildcats. After repeating as SEC tournament champions in 2006, the Gators won their first basketball national championship, defeating the UCLA Bruins 73–57 in the final game of the NCAA basketball tournament.

The Gators beat the Arkansas Razorbacks 77–56 to win their third consecutive SEC tournament title in 2007. Florida defeated Ohio State 84–75 to again win the NCAA basketball tournament championship.

Under Head Coach Todd Golden, the Florida Gators won their fifth SEC championship, beating Tennessee 86–77. The Gators then went on to win their third NCAA tournament, beating Houston 65–63.

The Gators play their home games in the Exactech Arena at the Stephen C. O'Connell Center. The 10,133-seat multi-purpose indoor arena was completed in 1980 and underwent massive renovations during the 2016–17 season. The arena is popularly known as the "O'Dome".

=== Olympics ===
Since 1968, 163 Gator athletes and 13 Florida coaches have represented 37 countries in the Olympic Games, winning 50 Olympic gold medals, 28 silver medals and 30 bronze medals through the 2012 Summer Olympics. The list of University of Florida alumni who are Olympic gold medalists includes Brad Wilkerson (baseball); Delisha Milton-Jones (basketball); Steve Mesler (bobsled); Heather Mitts and Abby Wambach (soccer); Theresa Andrews, Catie Ball, Tracy Caulkins, Matt Cetlinski, Conor Dwyer, Geoff Gaberino, Nicole Haislett, Mike Heath, David Larson, Ryan Lochte, Anthony Nesty, Dara Torres, Mary Wayte, Caeleb Dressel, and Martin Zubero (swimming); and Kerron Clement, Dennis Mitchell, Frank Shorter, Christian Taylor and Bernard Williams (track and field).

== Notable people ==
=== Notable alumni ===
As of August 2018 the University of Florida has 545,165 alumni. Over 57,000 are dues-paying members of the University of Florida Alumni Association. Florida alumni live in every state and more than 100 foreign countries. Florida alumni include two Nobel Prize winners, nine NASA astronauts, ten U.S. Senators, forty-two U.S. Representatives, eight U.S. ambassadors, eleven state governors, eleven state Supreme Court justices, and over fifty federal court judges. Florida graduates have served as the executive leaders of such diverse institutions as the U.S. Marine Corps and the National Organization for Women.

Notable University of Florida alumni include:

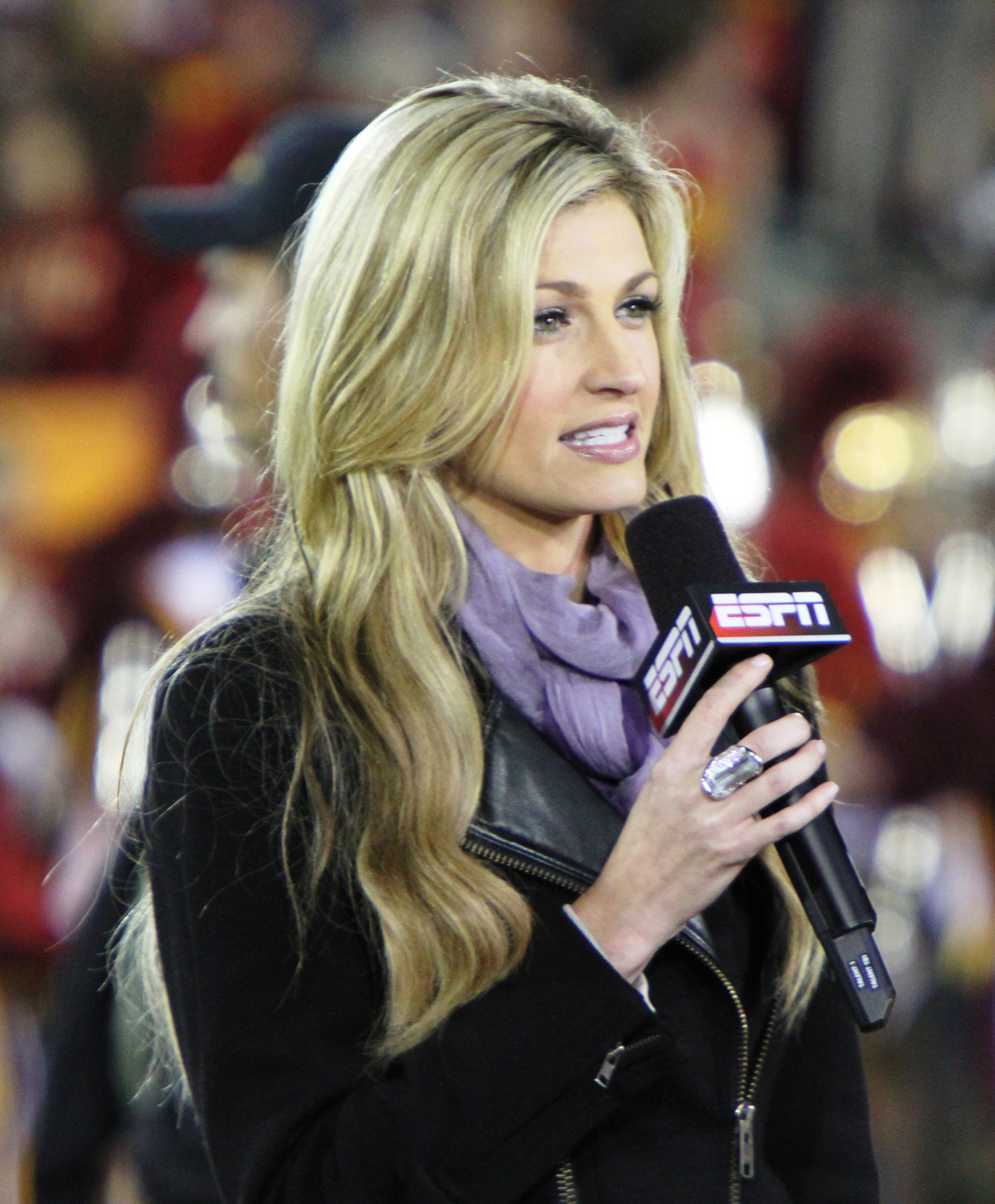
Erin Andrews
Sportscaster

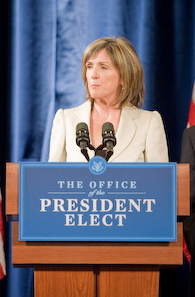
Carol Browner
Former White House Climate Director
& EPA Administrator

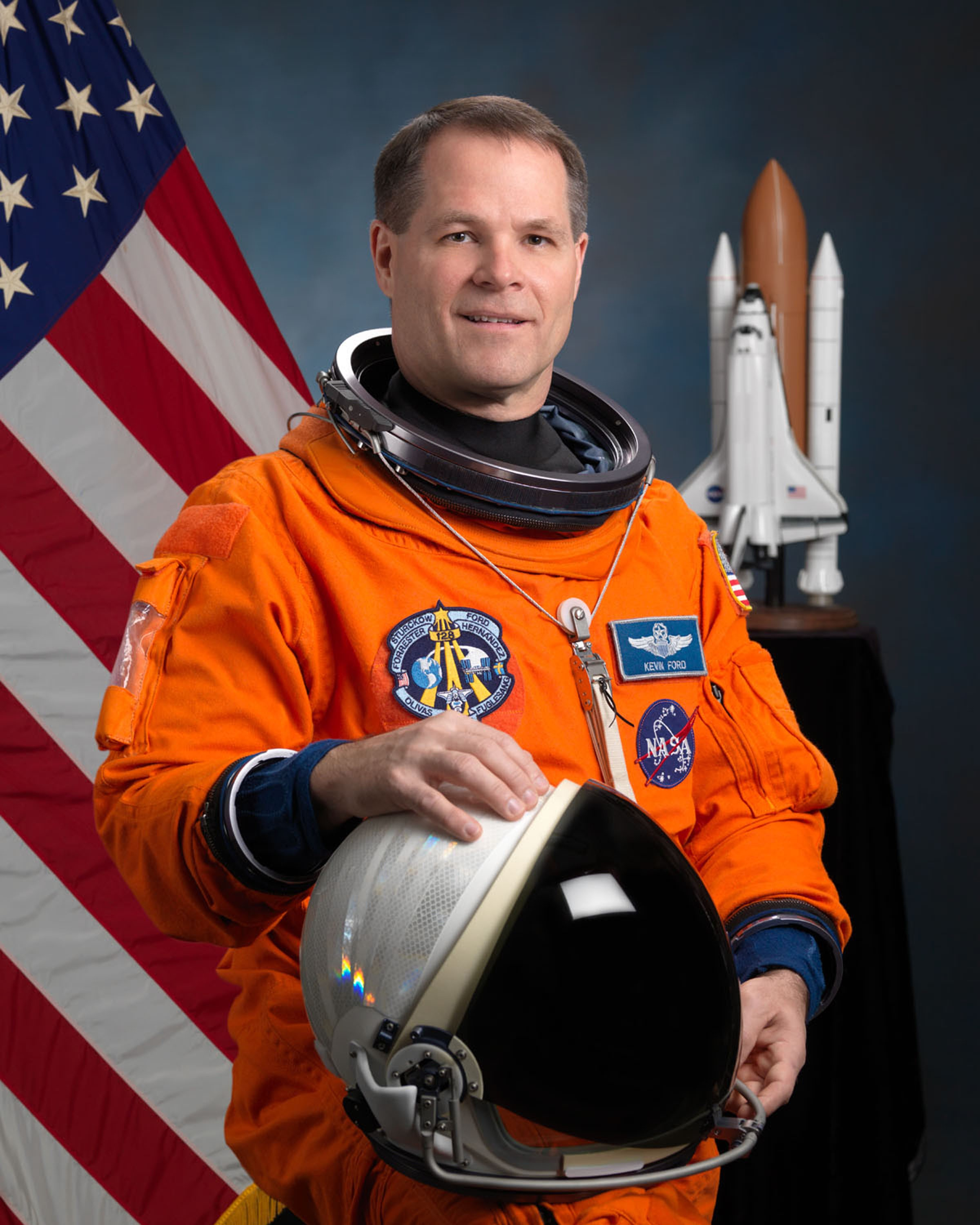
Kevin A. Ford
NASA astronaut
former (ISS commander)

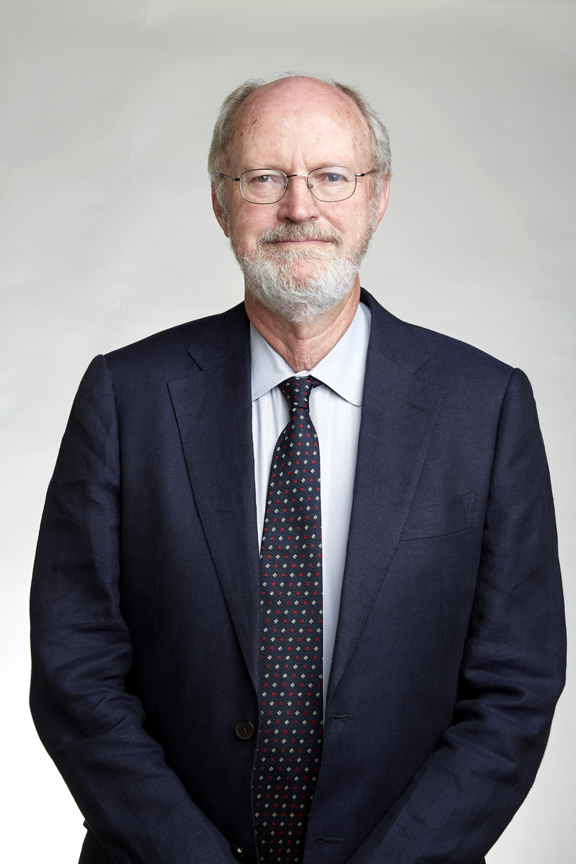
Robert H. Grubbs
Nobel Prize in Chemistry

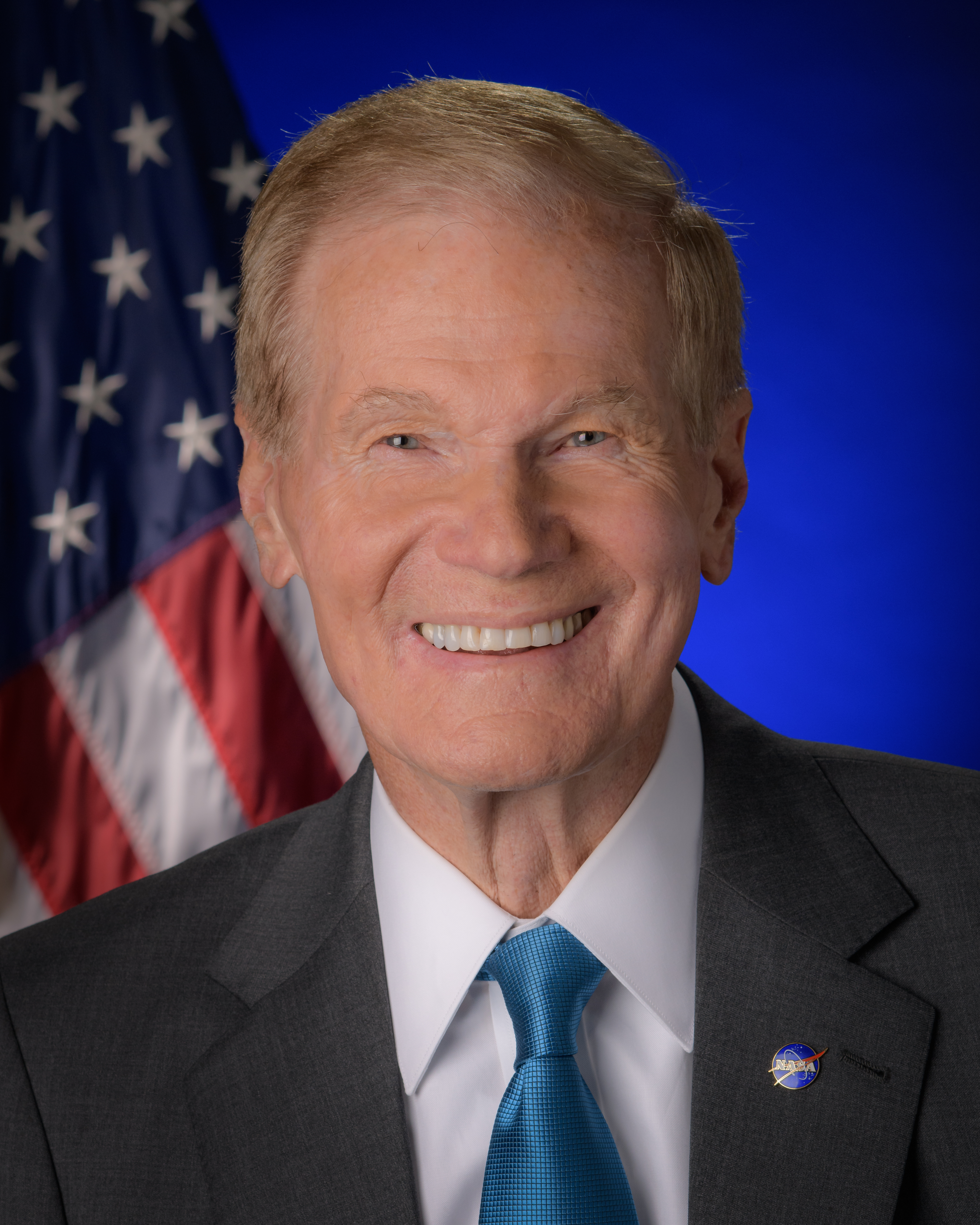
Bill Nelson
Former Administrator of NASA
& U.S. Senator

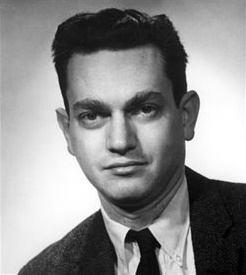
Marshall Warren Nirenberg
Nobel Prize in Physiology or Medicine

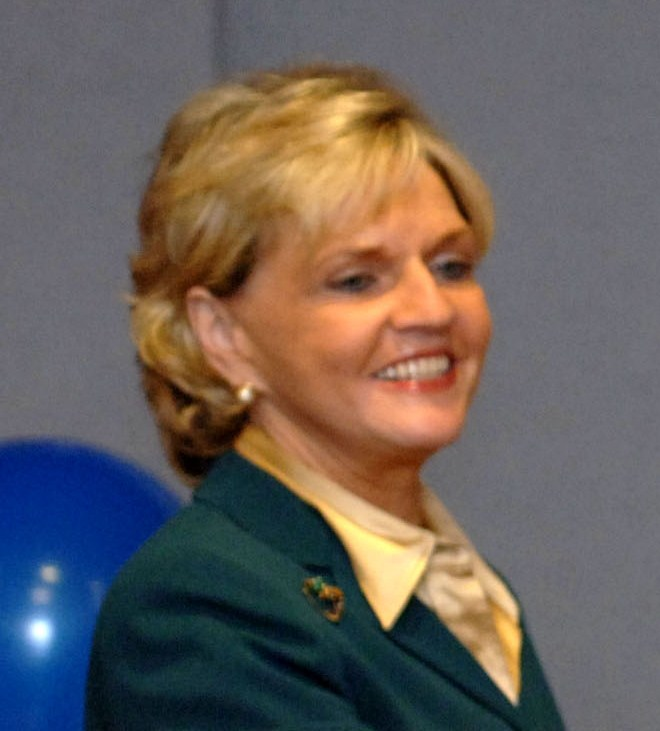
Beverly Perdue
Former Governor of North Carolina

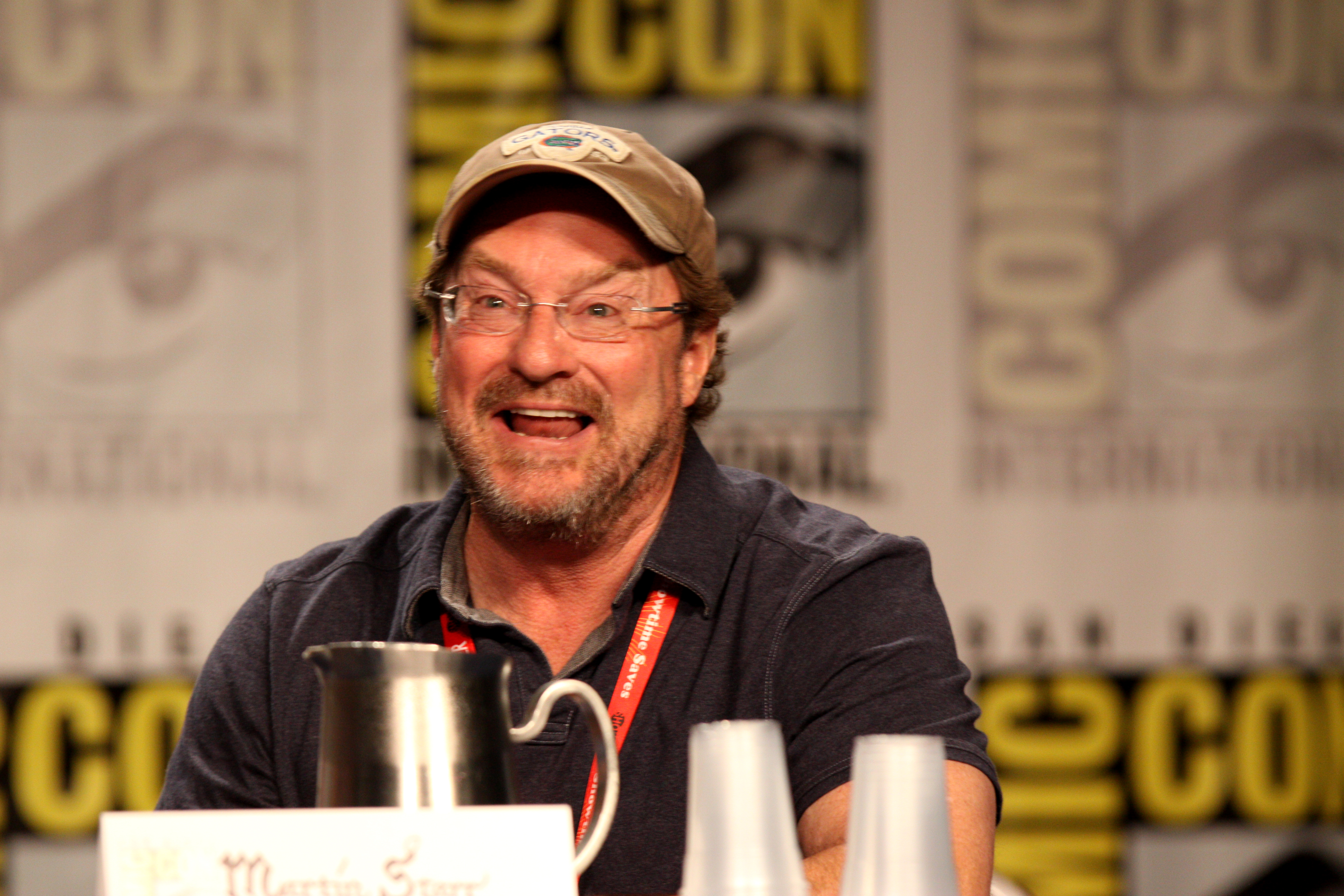
Stephen Root
Actor

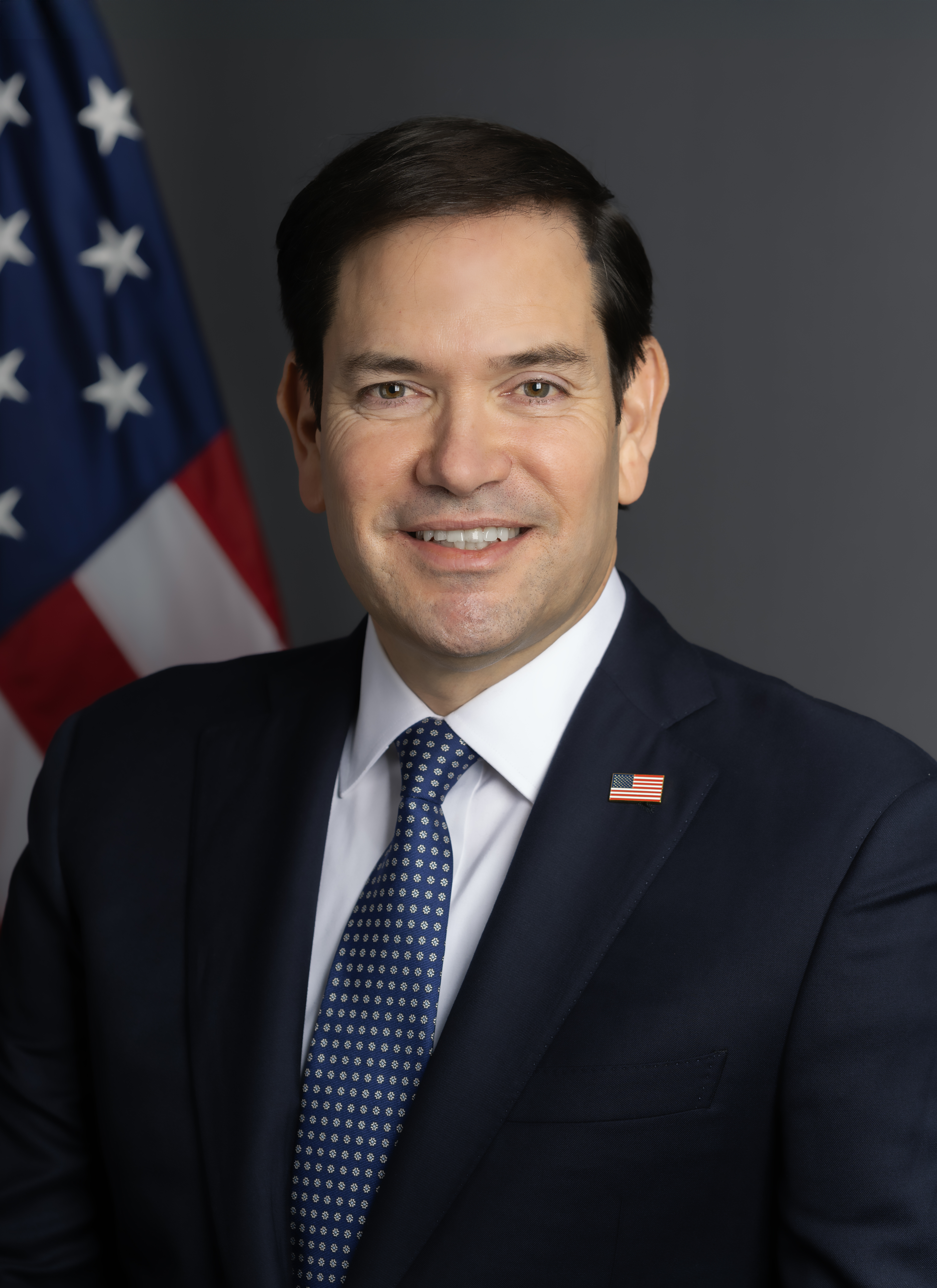
Marco Rubio
U.S. Secretary of State
& former U.S. Senator

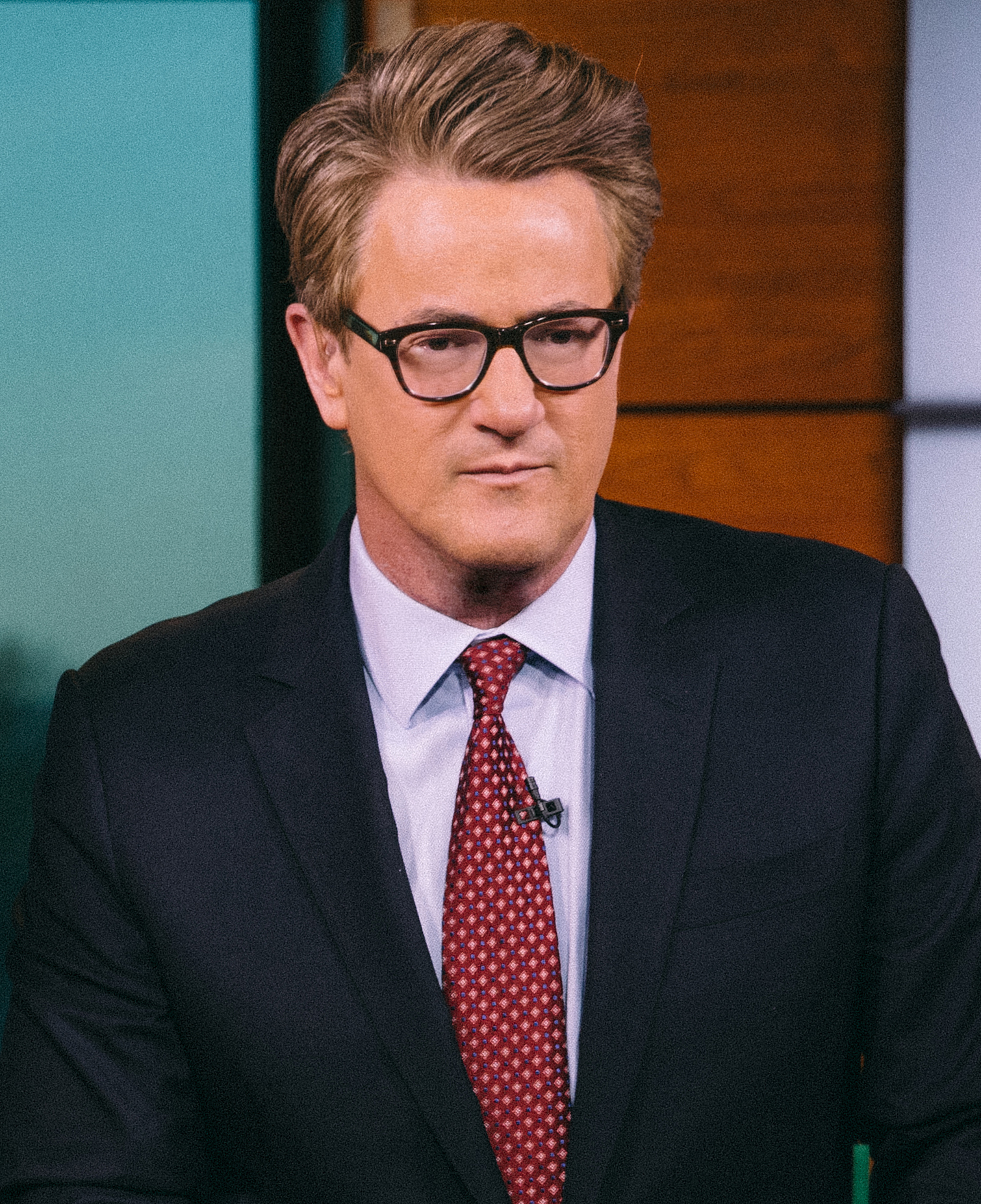
Joe Scarborough
MSNBC host

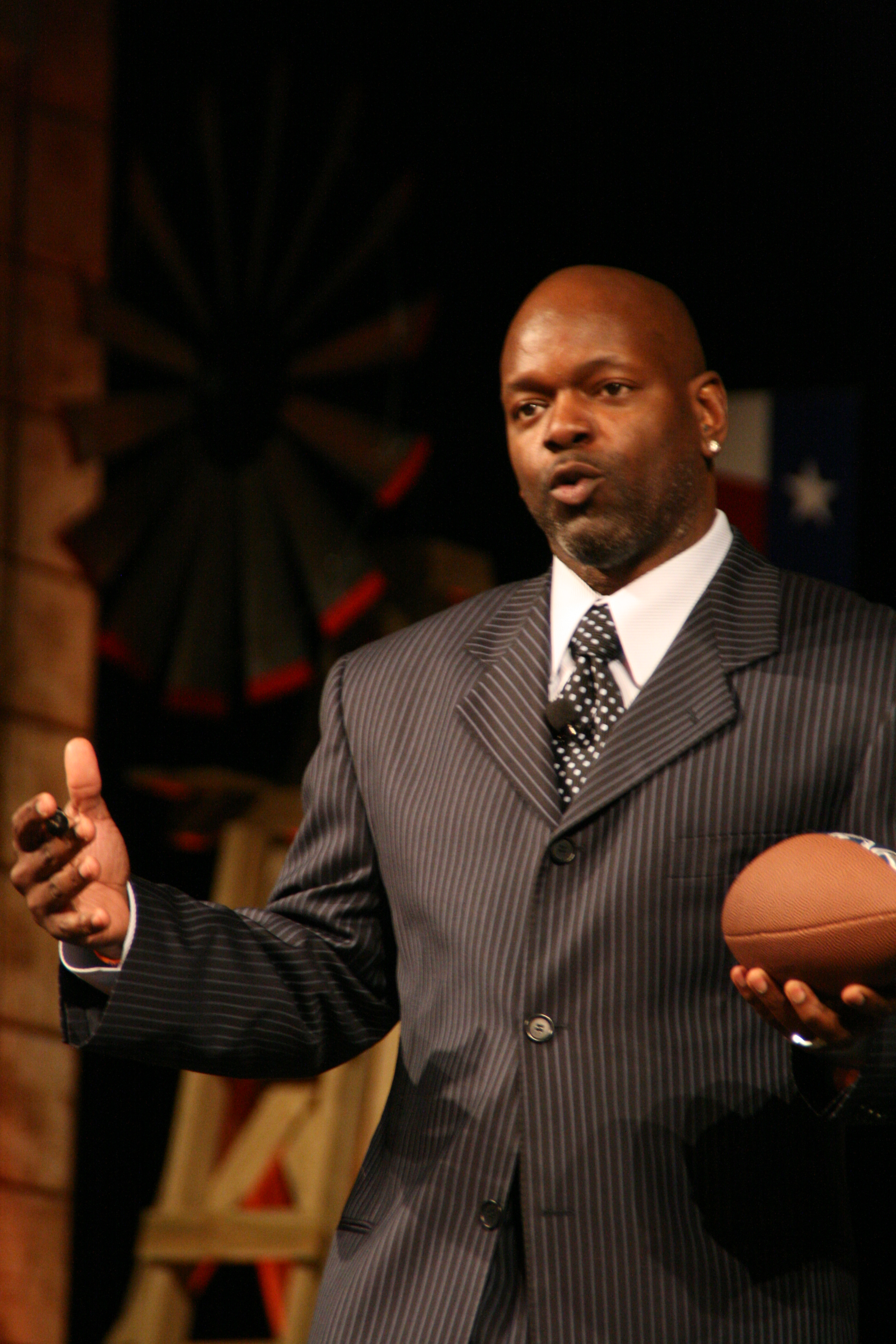
Emmitt Smith
Pro Football Hall of Famer

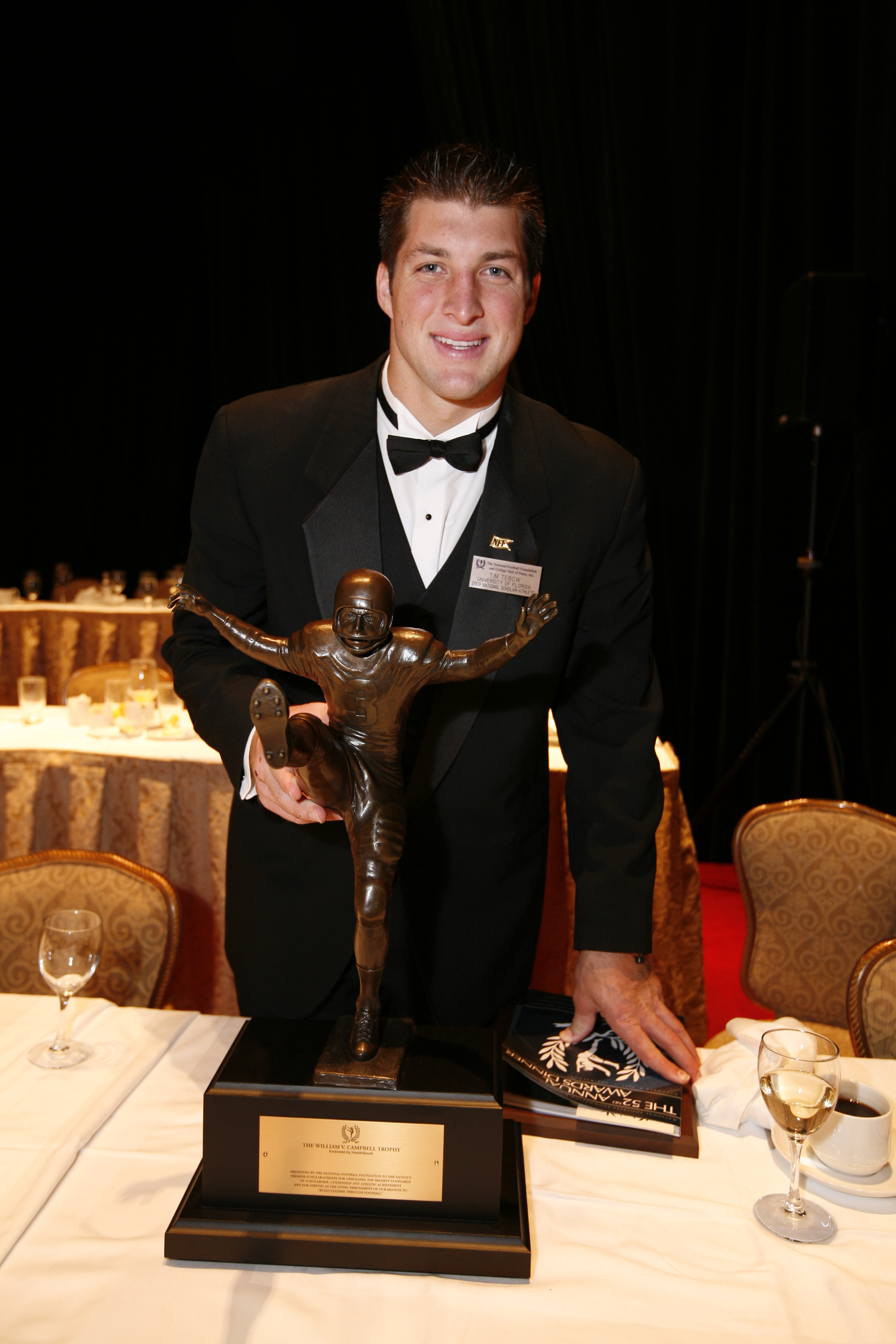
Tim Tebow
Heisman Trophy winner
College Football Hall of Famer

=== Notable faculty ===
Awards won by University of Florida faculty members include a Fields Medal and an Abel Prize in Mathematics, Albert Einstein Medal, ICTP Dirac Medal, Sakurai Prize, Frank Isakson Prize, Oliver E. Buckley Condensed Matter Prize, James C. McGroddy Prize for New Materials and a few Special Breakthrough Prizes for collaborators who made important contributions for the success LIGO's discovery of gravitational wave in Physics, numerous Pulitzer Prizes, and NASA's top award for research, and the Smithsonian Institution's conservation award. There are more than sixty eminent scholar endowed faculty chairs, and more than fifty faculty elections to the National Academy of Sciences, Engineering, or Arts and Sciences, the Institute of Medicine or a counterpart in a foreign nation. More than two dozen faculty are members of the National Academies of Science and Engineering and the Institute of Medicine or counterpart in a foreign nation.

Notable University of Florida Administrators & Faculty include:

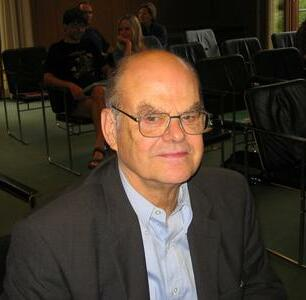
John Thompson

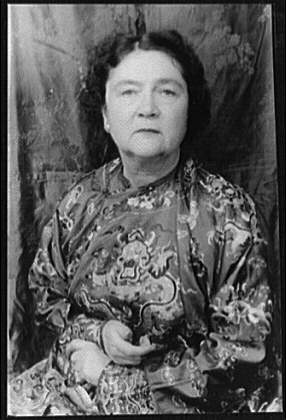
Marjorie Kinnan Rawlings

Pramod Khargonekar

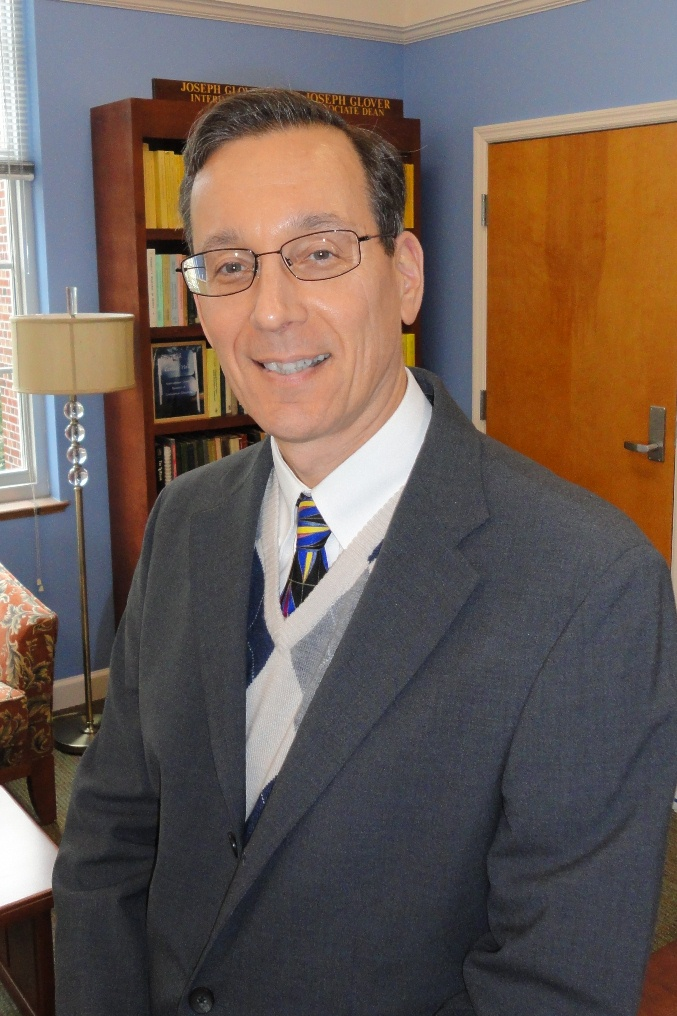
Joseph Glover

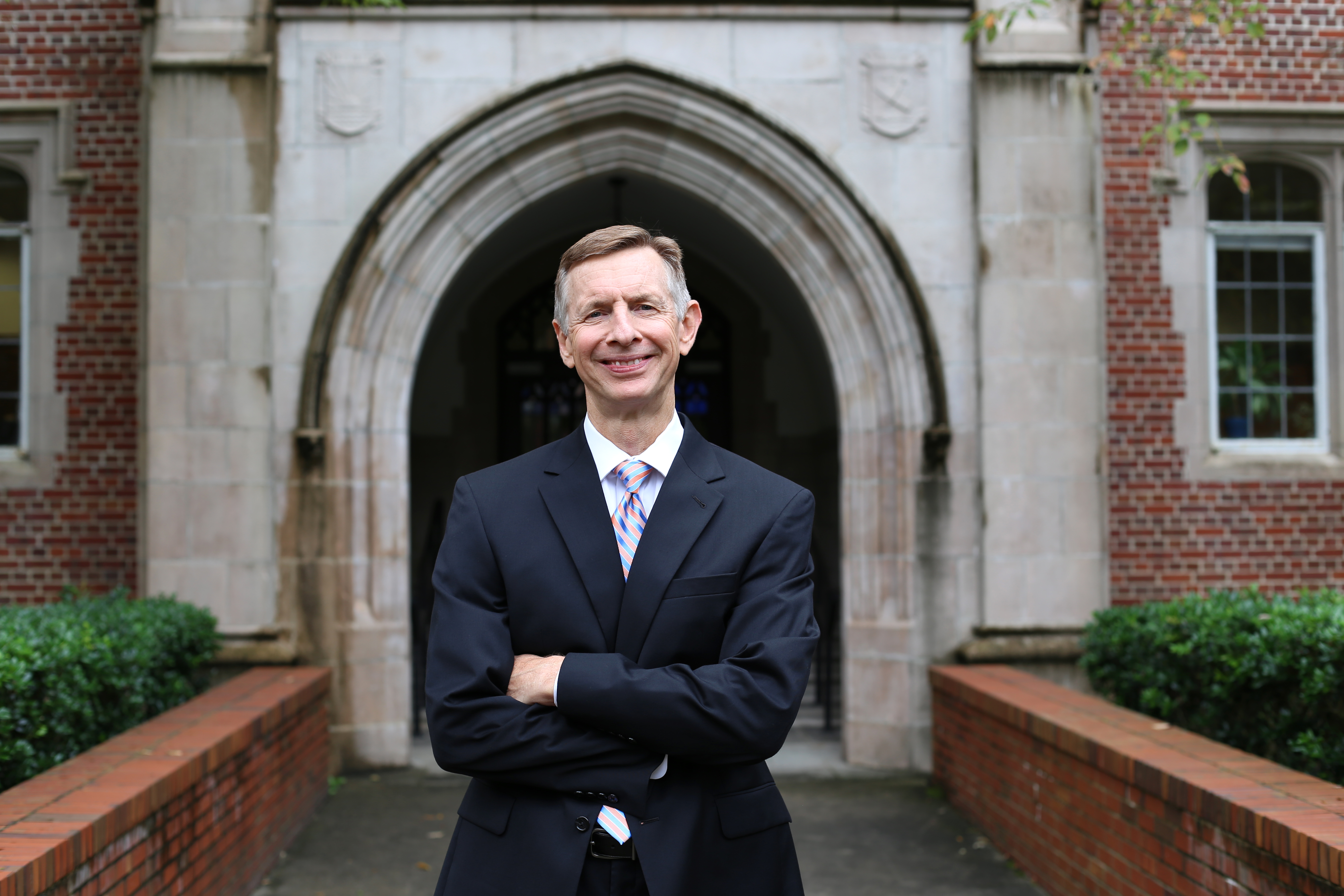
Glenn E. Good

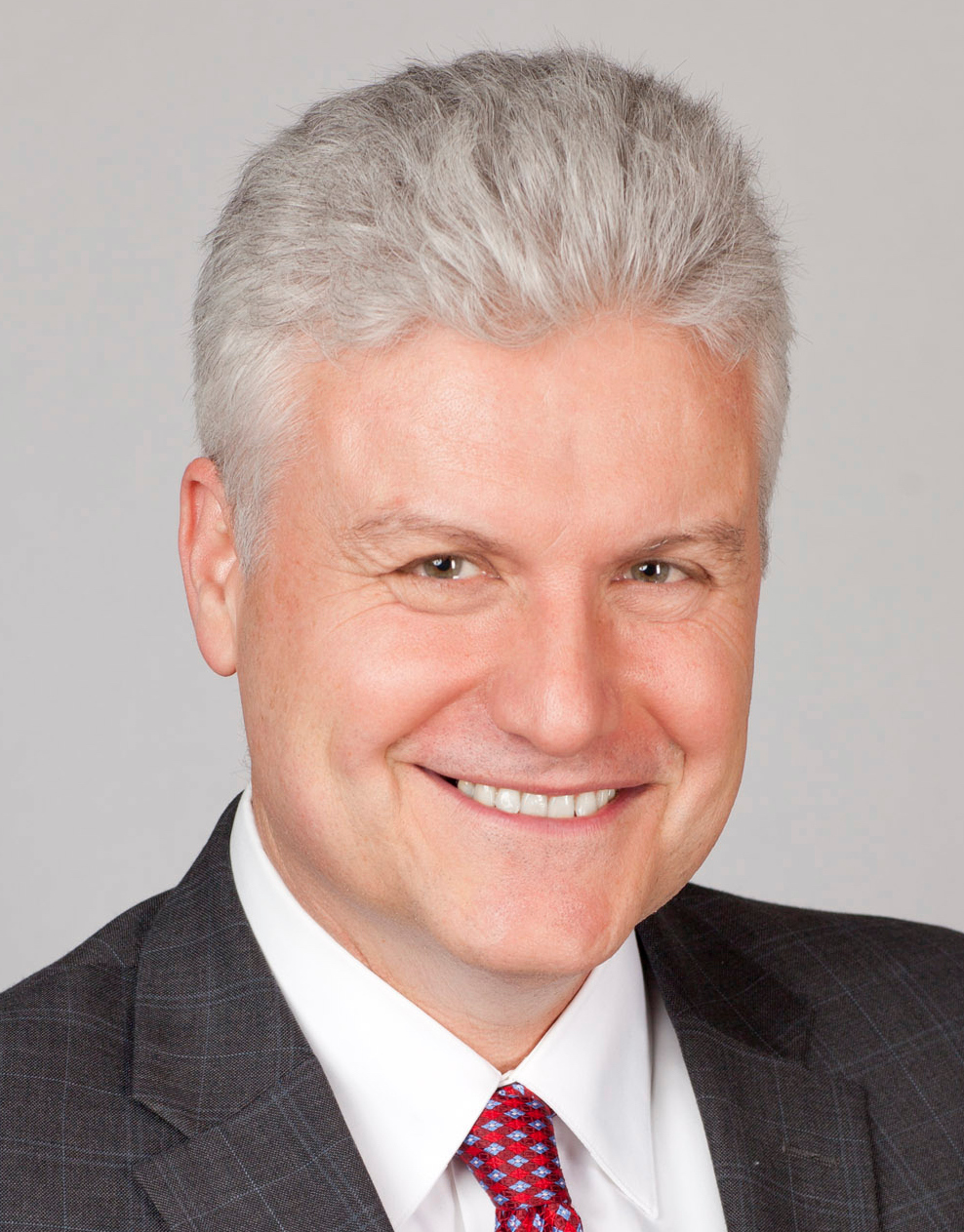
Johannes Vieweg

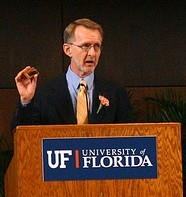
Carl Van Ness

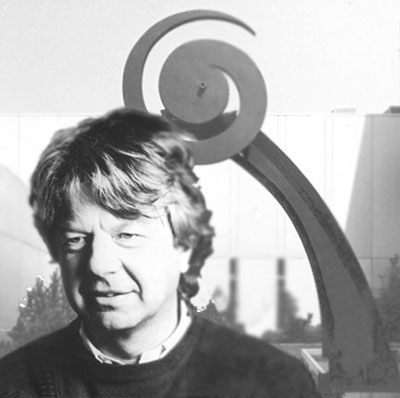
Harald von Boehmer

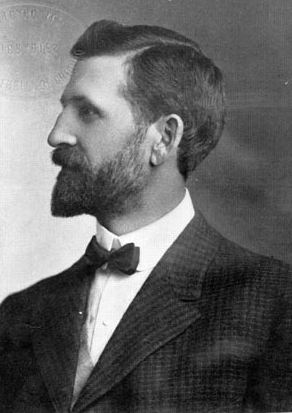
William Murrill

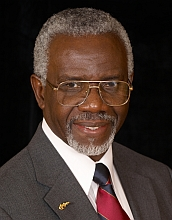
Jonathan F. Earle

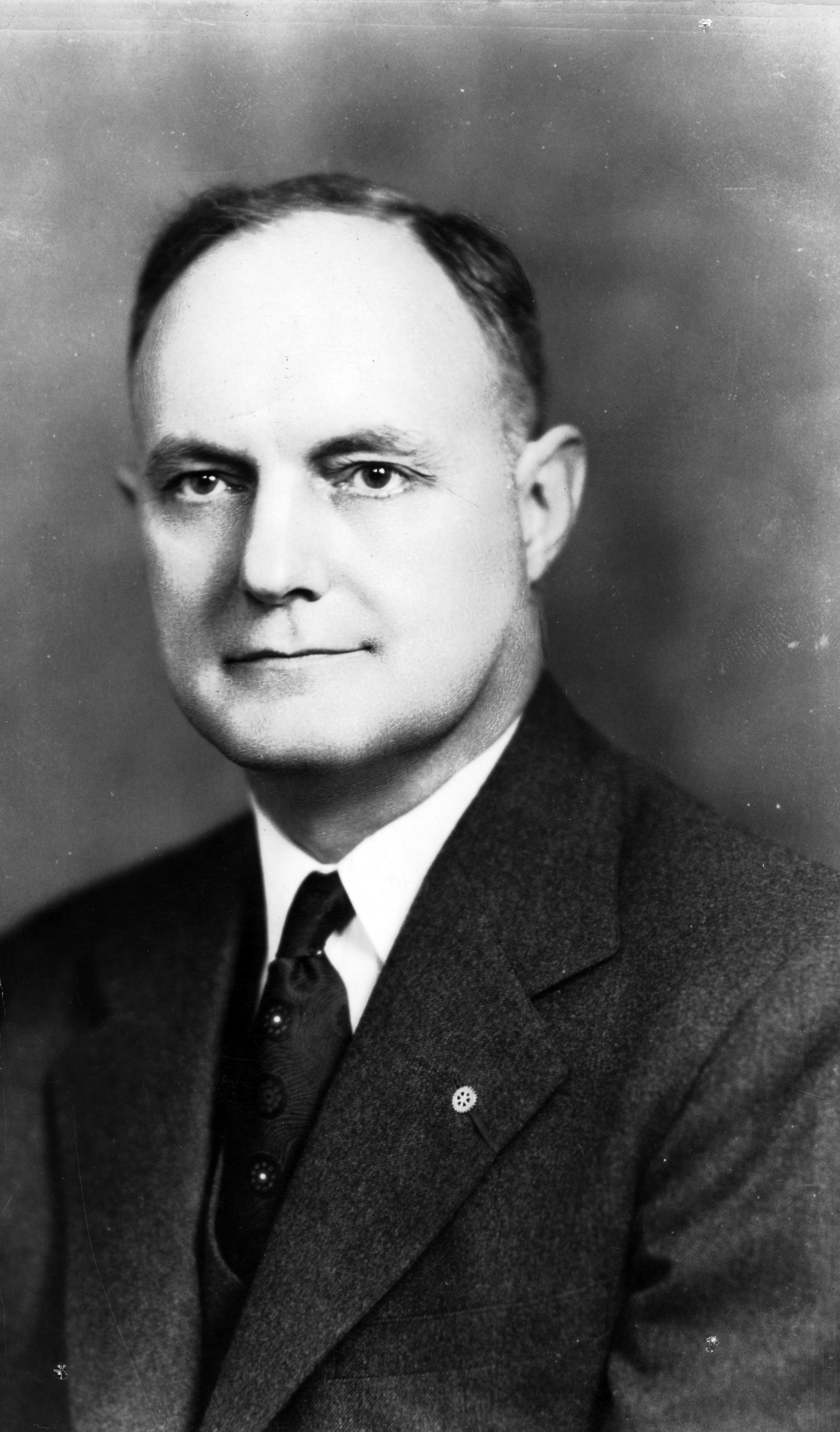
Blake Ragsdale Van Leer

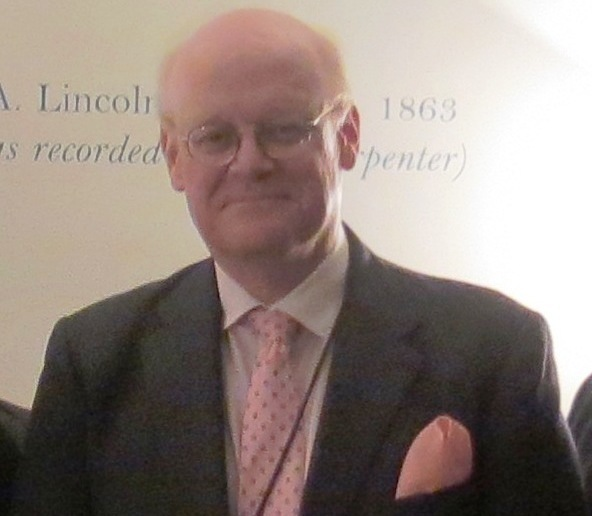
Allen C. Guelzo

== In popular culture ==
The University of Florida has been portrayed in several books, movies and television shows. In addition, the University of Florida campus has been the backdrop for a number of different books and movies.

=== Gatorade ===
Robert Cade, a professor in the university's College of Medicine, was the leader of the research team that invented the sports drink Gatorade as a hydration supplement for the Florida Gators football team in 1965–66.

Gatorade was created in 1965, by a team of scientists at the University of Florida College of Medicine, including Robert Cade, Dana Shires, Harry James Free, and Alejandro de Quesada. Following a request from Florida Gators football head coach Ray Graves, Gatorade was created to help athletes by acting as a replacement for body fluids lost during physical exertion. Like many of the sports drinks that pre-dated it by decades, such as Lucozade, the earliest version of the beverage consisted of a mixture of water, sodium, sugar, potassium, phosphate, and lemon juice. Ten players on the University of Florida football team tested the first version of Gatorade during practices and games in 1965, and the tests were deemed successful. On the other hand, star quarterback Steve Spurrier said, "I don't have any answer for whether the Gatorade helped us be a better second-half team or not... We drank it, but whether it helped us in the second half, who knows?" Nonetheless, the football team credited Gatorade as having contributed to their first Orange Bowl win over the Georgia Tech Yellow Jackets in 1967, at which point the drink gained traction within the athletic community. Yellow Jackets coach Bobby Dodd, when asked why his team lost, replied: "We didn't have Gatorade. That made the difference."

The University of Florida researchers initially considered naming their product "Gator-Aid", but eventually settled on "Gatorade".

== Satellite facilities ==
The university maintains a number of facilities apart from its main campus. The J. Hillis Miller Health Science Center also has a teaching hospital at UF Health at Jacksonville, which serves as the Jacksonville campus for the university's College of Medicine, College of Nursing, and College of Pharmacy. A number of residencies are also offered at this facility. The university's College of Pharmacy also maintains campuses in Orlando and Jacksonville. The College of Dentistry maintains clinics in Hialeah, Naples, and St. Petersburg.

The university's Warrington College of Business established programs in South Florida in 2004, and recently built a 6,100-square-foot (570 m^{2}) facility in Sunrise, Florida. The Institute of Food and Agricultural Sciences has extensions in each of the 67 counties in Florida, and 13 research and education centers with 19 locations throughout the state. In 2005, the university established the Beijing Center for International Studies in Beijing that offers research facilities, offices, and degree opportunities.

== See also ==
- ACCENT Speakers Bureau
- Eagle (application server)
- President's House
- Samuel Proctor Oral History Program
- University of Florida Cancer Hospital
- University of Florida forensic science distance education program
- University of Florida honorary degree recipients
- University of Florida presidents
- University of Florida Press
