= University of Florida Health =

American hospital network

- Industry: Health care
- Headquarters: Gainesville, Florida
- Area served: Florida
- Key people: Stephen J. Motew, M.D., M.H.A. - President and System CEO
- Revenue: ▲120 million USD (FY 2012)
- Number of employees: 33,000 (2021)
- Parent: University of Florida
- Website: ufhealth.org

The University of Florida Health (UF Health) is a medical network associated with the University of Florida. The UF Health network consists of 11 hospitals, including UF Health Shands Hospital in Gainesville and UF Health Jacksonville, as well as hundreds of outpatient clinics in North Florida and Central Florida. It used to be known as Shands Healthcare and UF&Shands. The network was named to the U.S. News & World Report's 2015 list of the nation's top 50 hospitals, and was named the #1 hospital in Florida in 2021.

== History ==
William A. Shands was a Florida state Senator, elected from the 32nd District in the mid-1940s. Shands was recruited to the effort to create a teaching hospital in the Gainesville area, though he at first considered that a larger city might be a better site, and was instrumental in obtaining state funding. In 1956, the University of Florida Colleges of Medicine and of Nursing opened; in 1958, the UF Teaching Hospital followed. It was renamed in 1965 to recognize Shands's efforts to W. A. Shands Teaching Hospital and Clinics. The institution later became Shands Hospital, part of the Shands HealthCare network.

In 1969, the UF College of Medicine established a satellite campus in Jacksonville at Duval Medical Center; this was renamed University Hospital in 1971. In 1999, both University Hospital and another Jacksonville hospital, Methodist Medical Center, were merged into Shands HealthCare as Shands Jacksonville, which included a hospital, associated clinics and the university campus. The complex was renamed UF Health at Jacksonville in 2013, with the hospital itself being named UF Health Jacksonville.

The UF network purchased Alachua General Hospital in east Gainesville from Santa Fe Health Care in 1996, changing the name to Shands AGH. Prior to being purchased by Santa Fe in 1983, AGH was owned by the county. On Nov. 1, 2009, Shands HealthCare closed Shands AGH due to budget cuts. The system simultaneously opened a cancer hospital south of its main location on the UF campus.

The network was renamed University of Florida Health in May 2013. University of Florida Health comprises multiple distinct legal entities, the largest being UF Heath Shands Gainesville and UF Health Jacksonville.

In 2020, UF Health acquired two new hospitals: Leesburg Regional and The Villages Regional.

In 2021, UF Health acquired Scripps Research's Florida branch in Jupiter, Florida.

== Facilities ==
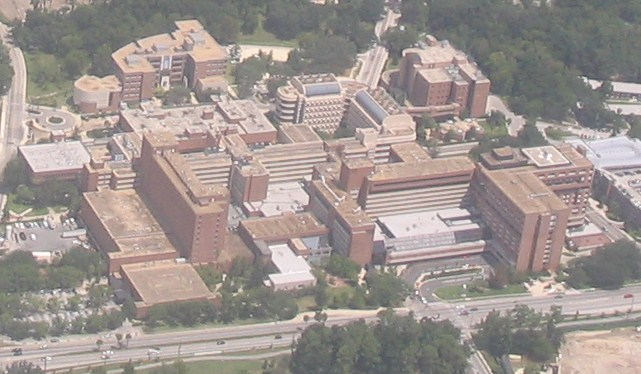
The Gainesville campus of Miller Health Science Center

The following tertiary facilities represent the core of UF Health's academic, teaching, trauma, specialty and research-related hospitals. With campuses in Gainesville and Jacksonville, UF Health includes six health colleges, six research institutes, two teaching hospitals, two specialty hospitals, a community hospital, and a host of physician medical practices and outpatient services throughout north central and northeast Florida.

=== Health Science Center Gainesville ===
Located at UF's main campus, the center encompasses six health colleges, six research institutes, three specialty hospitals and a teaching hospital. UF Health Cancer Center, Clinical and Translational Science Institute, Emerging Pathogens Institute, Genetics Institute, Institute on Aging and McKnight Brain Institute. The Health Science Center offers the most professional health degrees on a single campus of anywhere in the United States.

HSC Colleges (Gainesville)
College of Dentistry
College of Public Health and Health Professions
College of Medicine
College of Nursing
College of Pharmacy
College of Veterinary Medicine

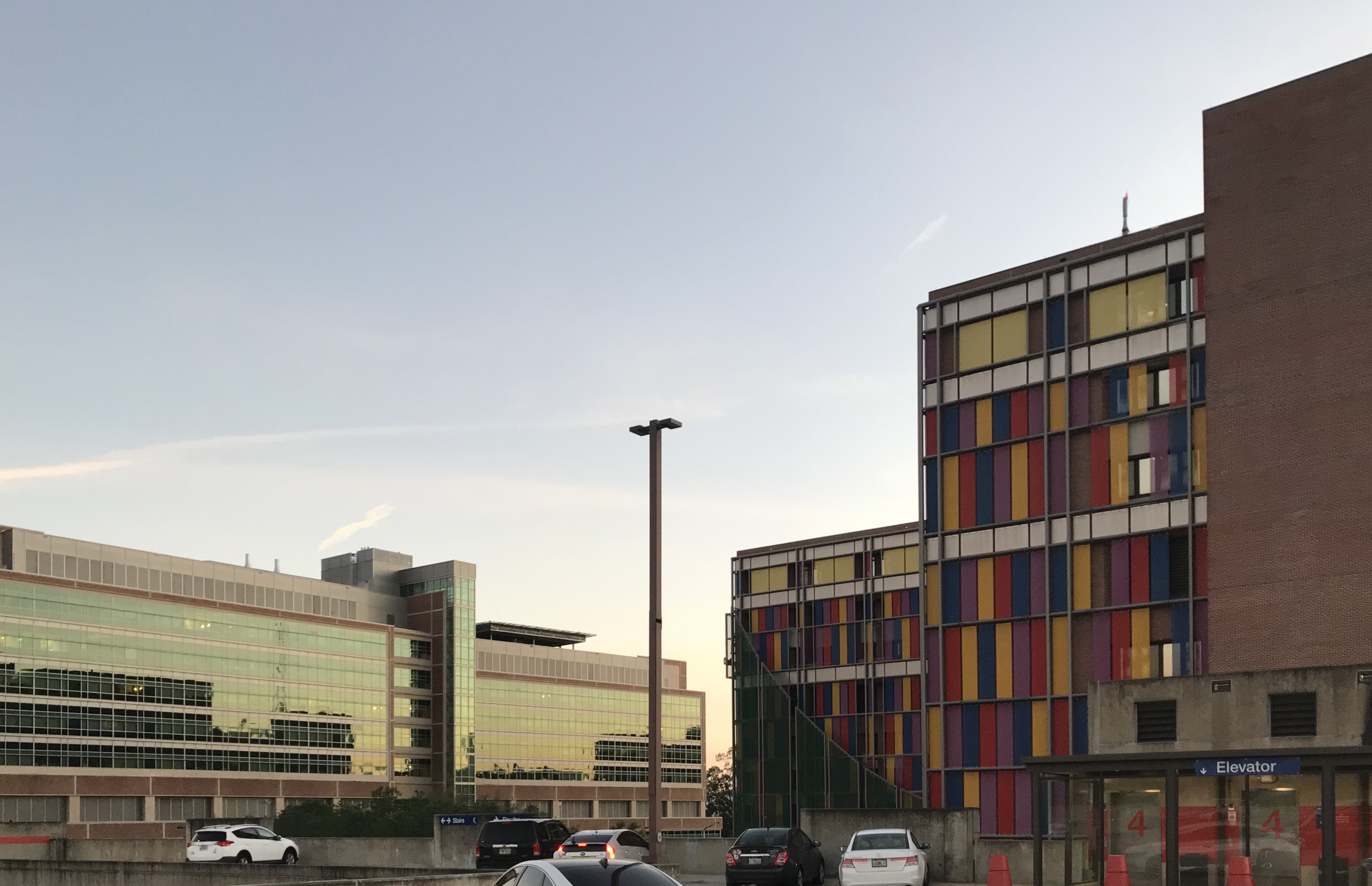
The Cancer Hospital (left) and Children's Hospital (right) as seen from the top of parking garage 10.

UF Health Shands Hospital is the flagship teaching hospital of the University of Florida. It is a Level I trauma center and a leading organ-transplant center. It has 1162 beds total. 425 of these beds are generalized while the remainder are in one of the four specialty hospitals listed below.

- UF Health Shands Children's Hospital, housing 208 beds and the pediatric emergency department. It is located in the north building which also holds the remaining 425 non-specialized adult beds.
- UF Health Shands Cancer Hospital, housing 192 beds as well as the adult emergency department, trauma wards, and a cancer research center. It may also be called the Cancer and Trauma Hospital or the south tower.
- UF Health Shands Neuromedicine Hospital, housing 160 beds and specialized neuro-ORs with intraoperative MRI. It is located in the same building as the Heart and Vascular Hospital. They may be referred to jointly as the HVN or east tower.
- UF Health Heart and Vascular Hospital, housing 120 beds and specialized cardiovascular hybrid ORs.

A new hotel for family and outpatients is also being constructed immediately south of the Cancer and Neuromedicine buildings. All four hospitals, as well as the nearby VA hospital, are connected at basement level, allowing patients to be transported more easily. The main and speciality hospitals are contained in three buildings; to avoid confusion, they are often called the north tower, south tower, and east tower.

=== Other Gainesville Locations ===
This list is incomplete and does not include all outpatient locations. UF Health offers outpatient pharmacies, primary care, specialty care, medical labs, and dental facilities in Gainesville, FL.

- UF Health Shands Rehab Hospital housing 40 beds. It houses patients in rehabilitation for those recovering from strokes, traumatic injuries, and other conditions that interfere with activities of daily living. Not to be confused with the Florida Recovery Center, which provides substance abuse rehabilitation.
- UF Health Shands Psychiatric Hospital housing 81 beds. This includes its subsidiary the UF Health Florida Recovery Center.
- UF Health Springhill Emergency Center
- UF Health Kanapaha Emergency Center
- UF Health ORTHOCare Orthopedics Center
- UF Health Small Animal Hospital
- UF Health Large Animal Hospital

=== Health Science Center Jacksonville ===
Jacksonville is home to a regional campus of UF Health, including three colleges, the UF Proton Therapy Institute, and the UF Health Jacksonville and UF Health North hospitals.

HSC Colleges (Jacksonville)
College of Medicine
College of Nursing
College of Pharmacy

- UF Health Jacksonville is a regional teaching hospital of the University of Florida. The 695-bed hospital is a Level I trauma center.
- UF Health North is a 216-bed community hospital and outpatient complex in North Jacksonville.

=== Other Hospital Campuses ===
- UF Health Leesburg
- UF Health St. Johns
- UF Health The Villages

Shands Healthcare sold its community hospitals (Shands Lake Shore, Shands Live Oak, and Shands Starke) on July 1, 2010, to Health Management Associates. In 2020 UF Health acquired two new hospitals, Leesburg Regional Medical Center and The Villages® Regional Hospital

UF Health announced in February 2023 that it intended to acquire Flagler Health+ in St. Johns County, and formally completed the acquisition in September 2023.

Plans have been announced to open new hospitals in Ocala, and Palm Beach Gardens.

=== Scripps Research Campus and Jupiter Medical Center Partnership ===
Scripps Research's Florida branch is now a part of UF Health. The Herbert Wertheim UF Scripps Institute for Biomedical Innovation & Technology is located in Jupiter, FL, along its southern border with Palm Beach Gardens. In 2022 UF Health announced a partnership with Jupiter Medical Center, and plans to jointly open a hospital in Palm Beach Gardens, FL.
