= Shands (disambiguation) =

Shands may reference one of the following:

- William A. Shands, a Florida politician for whom the following are named:
  - UF Health Shands Hospital, a medical center in Gainesville, Florida
  - UF Health Jacksonville, a medical center in Jacksonville, Florida, formerly referred to as Shands Jacksonville
  - Shands Bridge, which spans the St. Johns River south of Jacksonville, Florida
- Shands, California, a former settlement
