= J. Hillis Miller Sr. =

American higher education administrator (1899-1953)

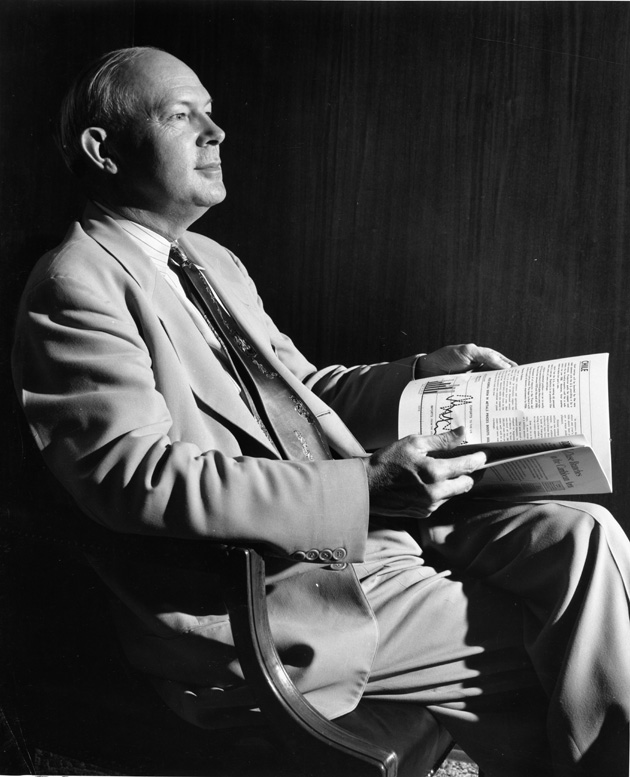
- University of Florida President; J. Hillis Miller, circa 1950.
- Born: August 29, 1899; Front Royal, Virginia, U.S.
- Died: November 14, 1953 (aged 54); Gainesville, Florida, U.S.
- Education: A.B., University of Richmond, 1924; M.A., University of Virginia, 1928; Ph.D., Columbia University, 1933
- Occupations: University Professor; University President
- Employer(s): College of William and Mary; Bucknell University; Keuka College; New York Department of Education; University of Florida
- Spouse: Nell Martin Critzer Miller

J. Hillis Miller Sr. (August 29, 1899 – November 14, 1953) was an American university professor, education administrator and university president. Miller was a native of Virginia, and earned bachelor's, master's and doctorate degrees before embarking on an academic career. He served as a psychology professor at the College of William & Mary and Bucknell University, the president of Keuka College, a senior administrator with the New York Department of Education, and the president of the University of Florida.

== Early life and education ==
Hillis Miller was born in Front Royal, Virginia in 1899. He received his high school education at the Randolph-Macon Academy in Front Royal. He earned his bachelor of arts degree from the University of Richmond in Richmond, Virginia in 1924, and married Nell Martin Critzer of Afton, Virginia in 1925. Miller later completed his master of arts in psychology from the University of Virginia in Charlottesville, Virginia in 1928, and his doctor of philosophy in counseling and administration from Columbia University in New York City in 1933.

== University professor, administrator, president ==
Miller was a psychology professor at the College of William and Mary in Williamsburg, Virginia from 1925 to 1928, and at Bucknell University in Lewisburg, Pennsylvania from 1930 to 1935, where he also served as the dean of students. He became the president of Keuka College in Keuka Park, New York in 1935, serving until 1941, when Miller was appointed Associate Commissioner of Education for the State of New York, a post he held for six years. During his tenure as associate director, Miller began planning for the education of returning World War II veterans—even before the war ended. Together with John S. Allen, he implemented the Associated Colleges of Upper New York (ACUNY), a temporary college system for the State of New York to meet the higher education needs of returning veterans.

The Florida Board of Control selected Miller to be the fourth president of the University of Florida in Gainesville, Florida in 1947, succeeding the retiring John J. Tigert. Miller set the tone for his presidency by addressing the Florida faculty, saying he would be satisfied with "nothing less than a great university, second to none in the land." During his time as president, student enrollment swelled with returning World War II veterans and their spouses and as a result of the educational benefits available to veterans from the G.I. Bill. Miller's administration managed the increase in the size of the student body from approximately 8,700 to over 12,000 in six years, and oversaw the transition of the formerly all-male institution into a coeducational university. Miller also supervised a huge $20 million campus construction program to build new student residential, academic and administration buildings.

I will be satisfied with nothing less than a great university, second to none in the land. That is our mandate.

— J. Hillis Miller, on his vision for the future of the
University of Florida, October 16, 1947.

One of the major priorities of Miller's administration was the planning and development of a health sciences program, consisting of a nursing school and a medical school—the first state medical school in Florida. His predecessor, John Tigert, had proposed the establishment of a medical school in the early 1940s, and a blue-ribbon citizens' panel had recommended the establishment of a medical school as part of the University of Florida in 1947. In 1949, the Florida Legislature authorized state-funded schools of medicine and nursing with a university hospital, but did not specify Gainesville as the site. The cities of Jacksonville, Miami and Tampa wanted the new medical school, too. Ultimately, the advisory committee established by the legislature and the president of the Florida Medical Association recommended Gainesville. Miller authorized the university architect to begin planning for the new health center facilities in 1950, consultants were engaged, Miller prompted the preparation of the "Medical Center Study" using money from the Commonwealth Fund in 1952, and presented the comprehensive plan to the Florida governor and cabinet. The legislature appropriated $5 million for construction of the new medical sciences building in 1953, and construction began in 1954.

Miller was also a strong proponent of the university's Florida Gators intercollegiate sports program. He prompted the hiring of a new head coach to revive the moribund Florida Gators football team, advocated the expansion of the university's football stadium, Florida Field, and supported other steps to place the University Athletic Association on a stronger financial footing.

Miller presided over the University of Florida's centennial celebration in 1953, recognizing the one-hundredth anniversary of the founding of the university's oldest predecessor institution, the East Florida Seminary. As part of the centennial, the university began construction of Century Tower, the iconic landmark of the Gainesville campus.

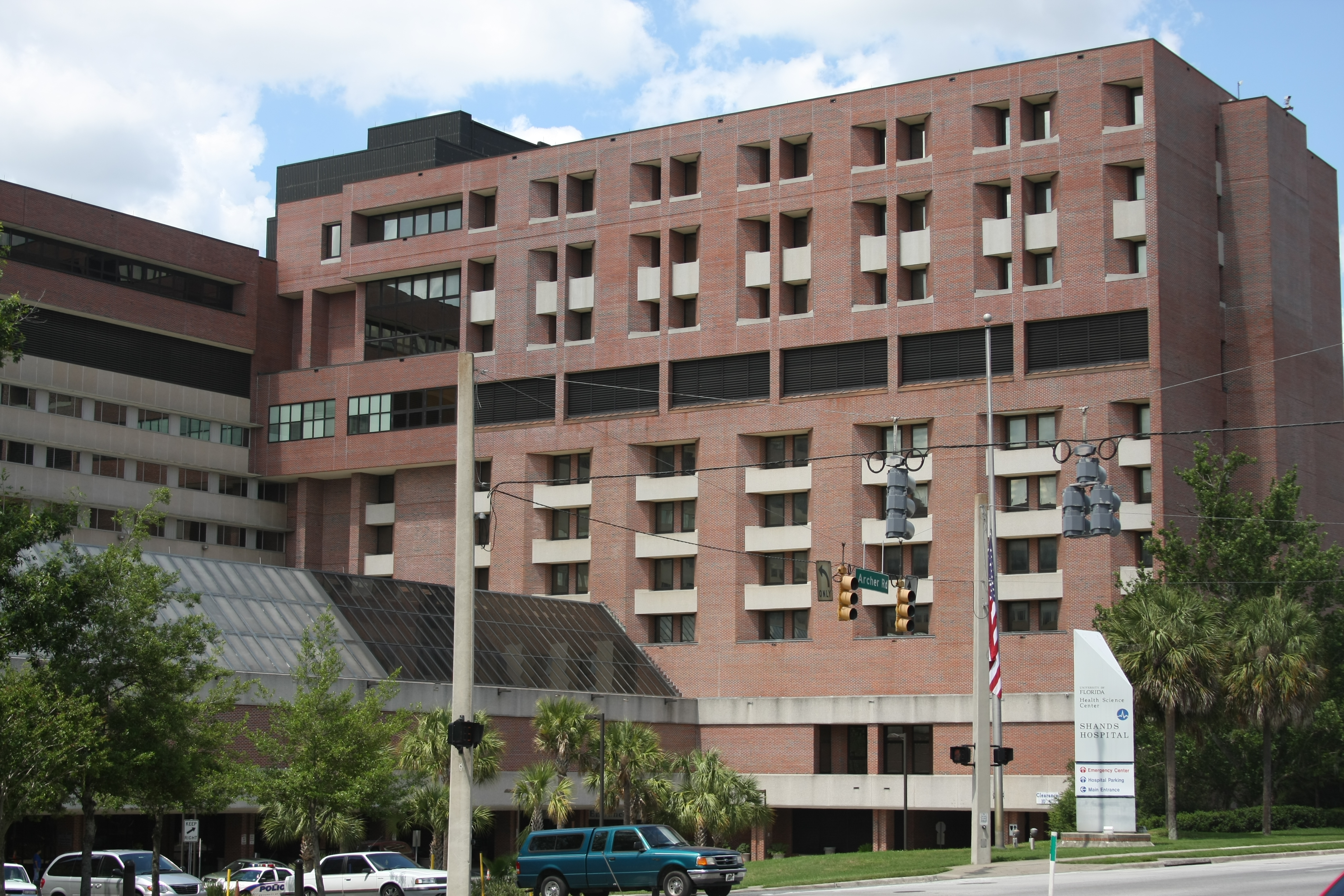
As viewed from S.W. Archer Road, the J. Hillis Miller Health Science Center, the medical-educational complex of the University of Florida located on its Gainesville, Florida campus. It encompasses the university's teaching hospital and colleges of medicine, nursing, dentistry and pharmacy.

== Death and legacy ==
Miller died on November 14, 1953. He was 54 years old. He had felt unwell for several days before the Florida–Georgia football game, and decided not attend the game in Jacksonville. While watching the game on television, Miller experienced physical illness and was taken to the hospital. He died seven days later of rheumatic heart disease. Miller was survived by his wife, Nell Critzer Miller, and their two sons, including J. Hillis Miller Jr., who became a prominent American professor of English literature. On the day of his on-campus funeral service, the university canceled classes and closed all university offices, and over 10,000 people attended the funeral, including the acting governor, the governor-elect, three former governors, the state board of education and all members of the Board of Control under whom Miller had served. He was eulogized as a national education leader who greatly enhanced the University of Florida's recognition and national reputation.

In recognition of Miller's efforts as president of the University of Florida and his success in advocating, planning and funding the new medical school and other health-related colleges, the university named the new J. Hillis Miller Health Science Center in his memory in October 1956. The College of Medicine, whose planning and development was Miller's major accomplishment as president, opened in 1956 and graduated its first students in 1960. The College of Nursing also held its first classes in 1956, the College of Health-Related Professions and the Shands Teaching Hospital opened in 1958. Today, the Miller Health Science Center encompasses six separate academic colleges, enrolls over 6,500 undergraduate, graduate and professional students, and employs over 1,200 residents.

== See also ==
- Florida Gators
- History of Florida
- History of the University of Florida
- List of Columbia University people
- List of University of Florida presidents
- List of University of Florida Athletic Hall of Fame members
- List of University of Richmond people
- List of University of Virginia people
- State University System of Florida

== Bibliography ==
- Pleasants, Julian M., Gator Tales: An Oral History of the University of Florida, University of Florida, Gainesville, Florida (2006). ISBN 0-8130-3054-4.
- Proctor, Samuel, & Wright Langley, Gator History: A Pictorial History of the University of Florida, South Star Publishing Company, Gainesville, Florida (1986). ISBN 0-938637-00-2.
- Van Ness, Carl, & Kevin McCarthy, Honoring the Past, Shaping the Future: The University of Florida, 1853–2003, University of Florida, Gainesville, Florida (2003).
