= Michael L. Good =

American anaesthesiologist

Michael Good
- Education: University of Michigan
- Scientific career
- Fields: Medicine
- Workplaces: University of Florida; University of Utah

Michael L. Good is an American anesthesiologist who was the Chief Executive Officer of University of Utah Health and the A. Lorris Betz Senior Vice President of Health Sciences at the University of Utah from 2018 to 2025. He was Executive Dean of the Spencer Fox Eccles School of Medicine from 2018 to 2023, and Chair of the Board of Directors for University of Utah Health Insurance Plans from 2018 to 2025. He served as the interim president of the University of Utah in 2021.

== Early life and education ==
Good attended Waterford Kettering High School then graduated from the University of Michigan with a bachelor's degree in computer and communication sciences. He also earned his medical degree from Michigan and moved to Gainesville in 1984 to complete residency training in anesthesiology and a research fellowship at University of Florida, where he joined the College of Medicine faculty in 1988.

== Career ==
Good was a faculty member at the University of Florida for 30 years. In the 1980s, he led a team of physicians and engineers that invented the Human Patient Simulator, previously called the Gainesville Anesthesia Simulator, a full-body computer-controlled mannequin simulator. In 1994, he became the chief of anesthesiology at the Malcom Randall VA Medical Center in Gainesville, Florida, and in 1998, chief of staff and system medical director for the North Florida South Georgia Veterans Health System. In 2005, he was named associate dean for clinical affairs and chief of staff for UF Health Shands Hospital and Shands AGH. Good was appointed as the ninth Dean of the University of Florida College of Medicine, serving from 2008-2018. During his tenure as medical school dean at Florida he built new facilities that helped to grow ambulatory practice visits, hospital admissions, surgical procedures and emergency department visits by 70 percent or more; grew annual NIH grant funding by 67 percent; and modernized medical education at UF with a new, state-of-the-art medical education facility, the George T. Harrell Medical Education Building.

During his tenure leading University of Utah Health, Good played a critical role in leading Utah to be positioned as a national model in mental health care; created a partnership to develop an innovative medical education focusing on population health; secured a gift for medical education and scientific research; and began reforms to the medical education curriculum.

In 2023, Good was elected as a fellow of the National Academy of Inventors, and in 2024, as a member of the board of directors of the Association of American Medical College. He previously served as chair of the Alliance of Academic Health Centers board of directors. and as a member of the board of directors for University of Utah Hospitals & Clinics (2018-2025) and Shands Health Care (2008-2018).

During the 2020 coronavirus pandemic, Good served on Utah's Public Health and Economic Emergency Commission, and he chaired the commission's Medical Advisory Subcommittee.

Preceded by Dr. Bruce C. Kone	Dean of UF College of Medicine; 2008 – 2018	Succeeded by Dr. Colleen G. Koch
