= University of Florida Health Science Center =

Academic Health Center

J. Hillis Miller Health Science Center
- Type: Public Academic Health Center
- Established: 1956
- Parent institution: University of Florida
- Endowment: ▲$2.379 billion (2021) (university-wide)
- Dean: Colleen G. Koch
- Students: 7,010
- Location: Gainesville, Jacksonville, Florida, USA; 29.64°N 82.35°W
- Website: ufhealth.org

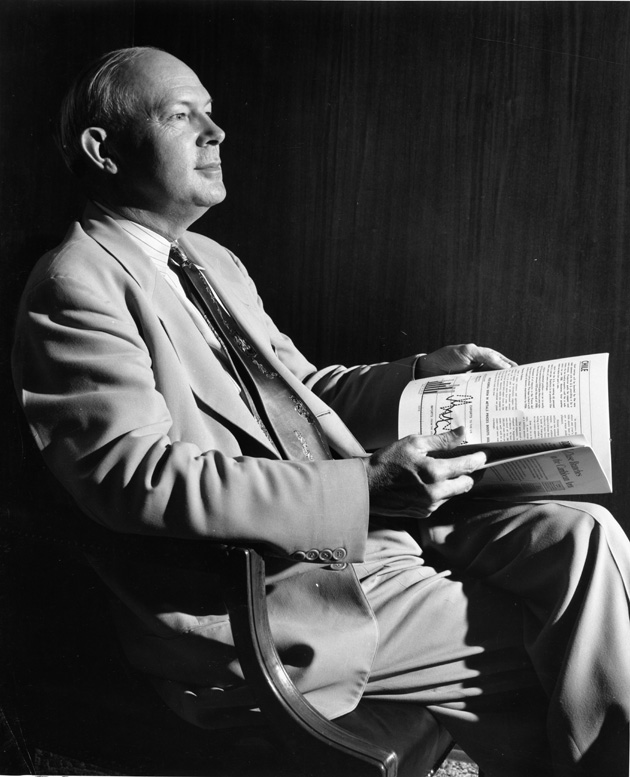
J. Hillis Miller the fourth president of the University of Florida.

The University of Florida Health Science Center (HSC), also known as the J. Hillis Miller Health Science Center, is the medical division of the University of Florida.

Its primary campuses are located on the university's main campus in Gainesville, Florida and at UF Health at Jacksonville in Jacksonville, Florida. The Health Science Center comprises six colleges: Dentistry, Medicine, Nursing, Pharmacy, Public Health and Health Professions, and Veterinary Medicine. The Gainesville campus is the only academic health center in the United States with six health-related colleges located on a single, contiguous campus.

In 2018 the Health Science Center generated over $410 Million in total research awards, and also collected over $22 Million in licensing and royalties The HSC is affiliated with UF Health Shands Hospital in Gainesville and UF Health Jacksonville.

As of 2019 the Health Science Center enrolls 7,010 students within the six HSC academic colleges. In addition the HSC employs over 2,400 Faculty Members, over 24,000 staff members, and over 1,200 fellows and residents.

== History ==
The facility was named after the fourth president of the University of Florida, J. Hillis Miller Sr., who served from 1947 to 1953. Miller spearheaded the effort to fund and build the university's College of Medicine and its teaching hospital, which were incorporated into the Health Science Center.

== Divisions ==
=== Health Science Center Gainesville ===
Located at UF's main campus, the center encompasses:

- Six health colleges:
  - College of Dentistry
  - College of Public Health and Health Professions
  - College of Medicine
  - College of Nursing
  - College of Pharmacy
  - College of Veterinary Medicine
- Six research institutes:
  - UF Health Cancer Center
  - Clinical and Translational Science Institute
  - Emerging Pathogens Institute
  - Genetics Institute
  - Institute on Aging
  - McKnight Brain Institute
- Two specialty hospitals
- One teaching hospital: UF Health Shands Hospital

=== Health Science Center Jacksonville ===
Jacksonville is home to a large regional campus of UF Health, including:

- Three colleges:
  - College of Medicine
  - College of Nursing
  - College of Pharmacy
- UF Proton Therapy Institute
- UF Health Jacksonville hospital

== Facility Images ==
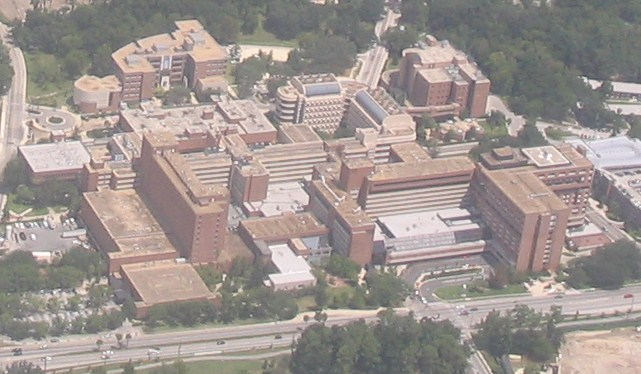
Bird's-eye view of the Health Science Center

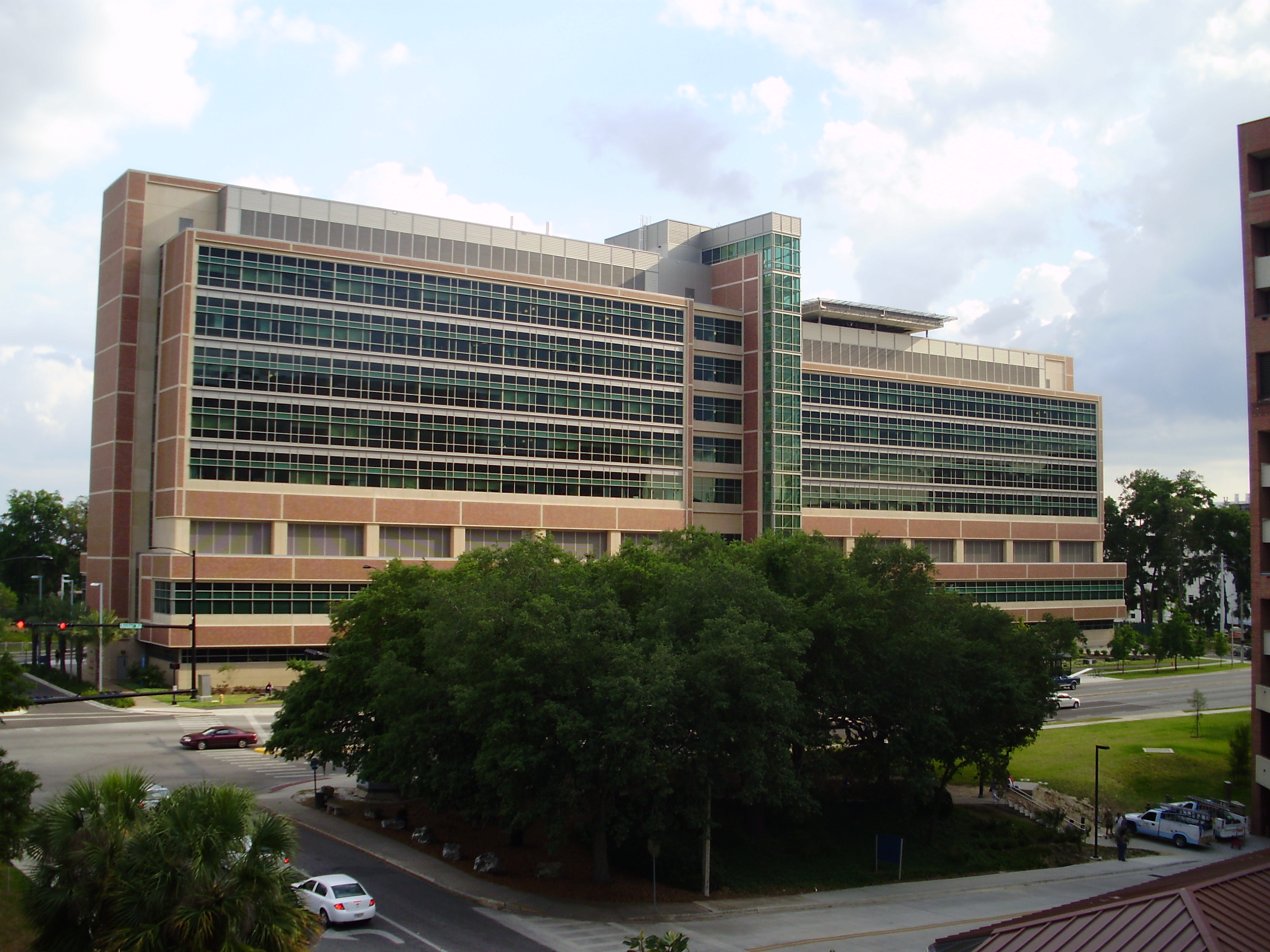
Cancer Center

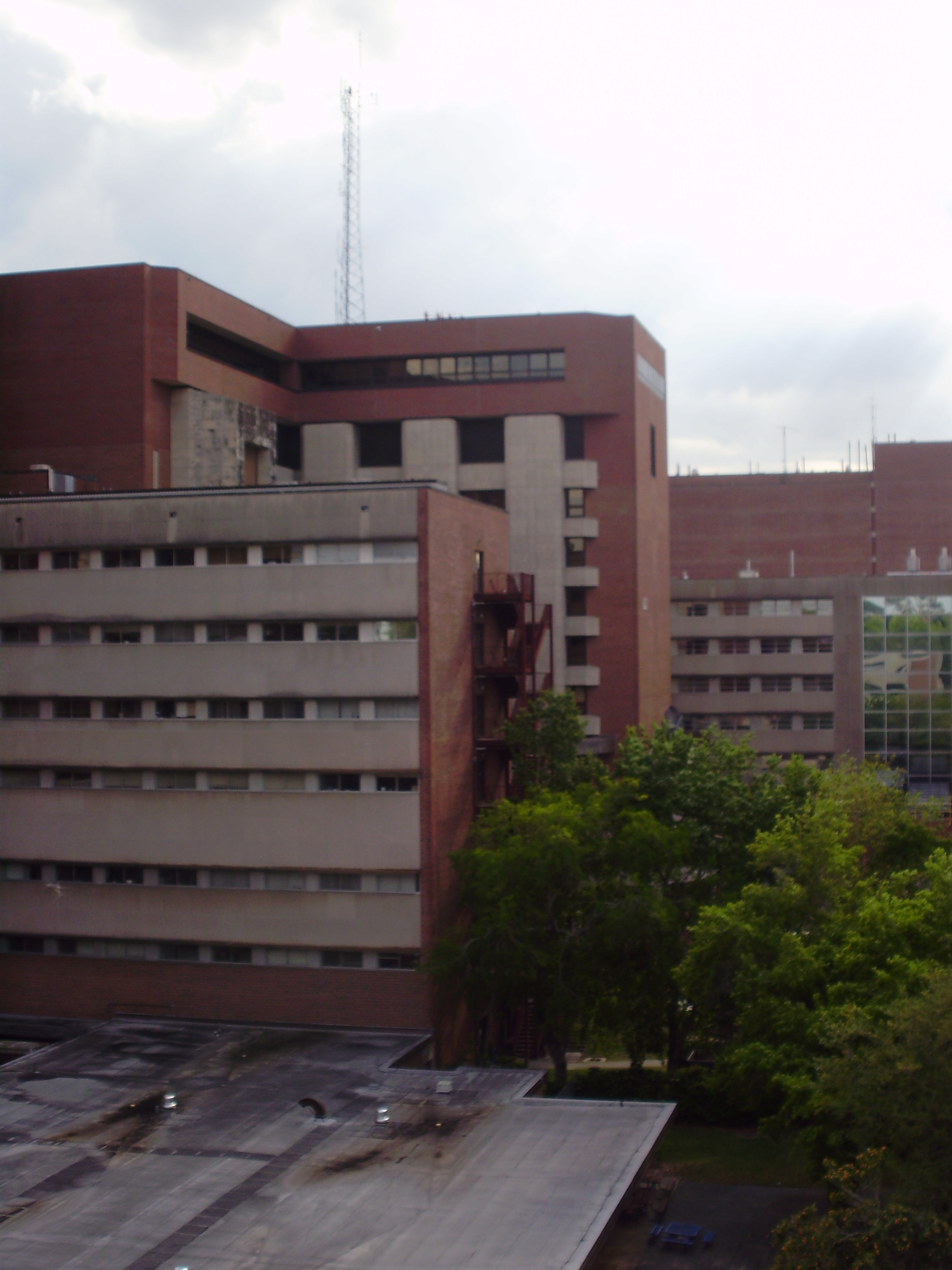
Teaching Hospital

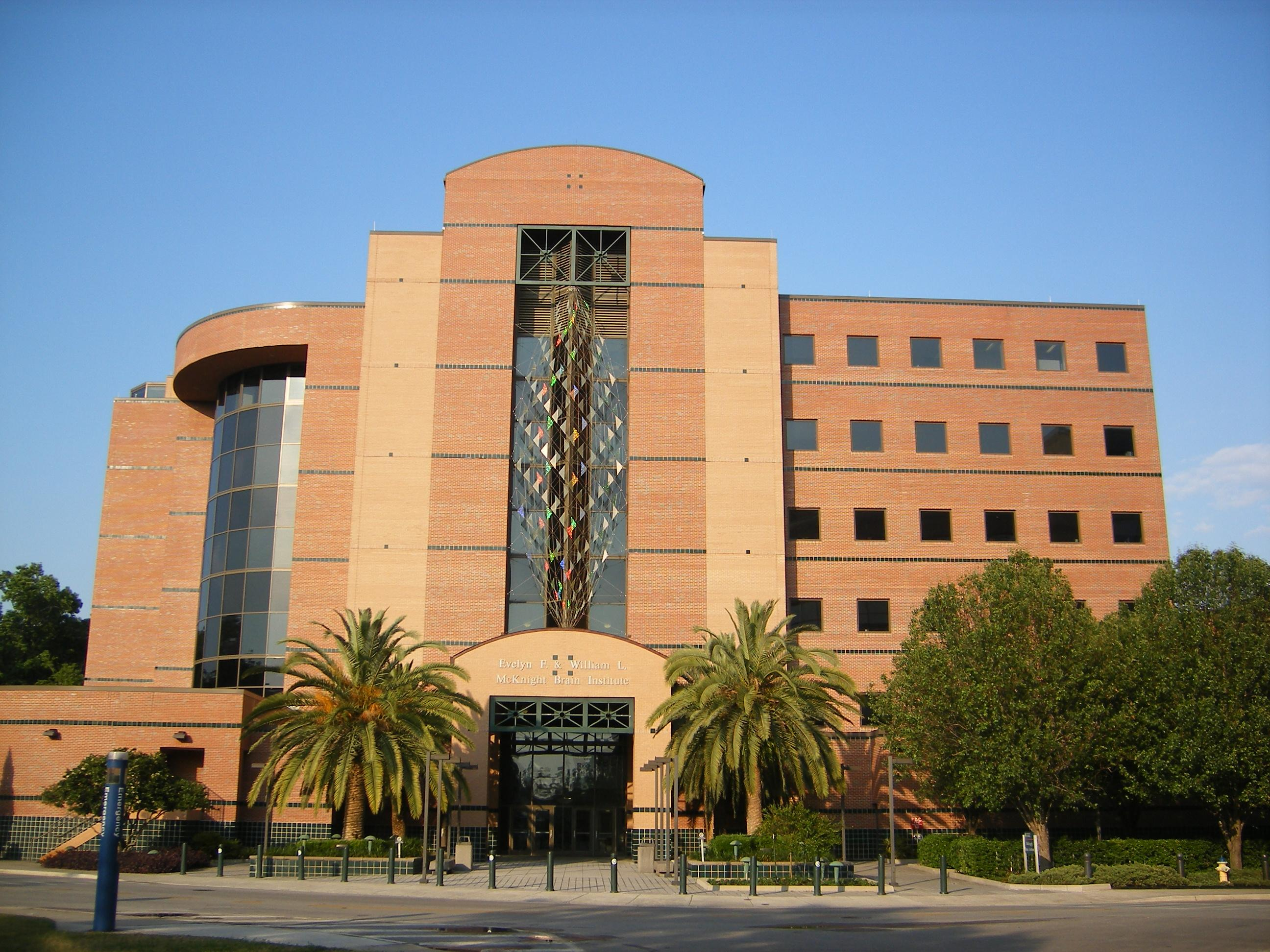
McKnight Brain Institute

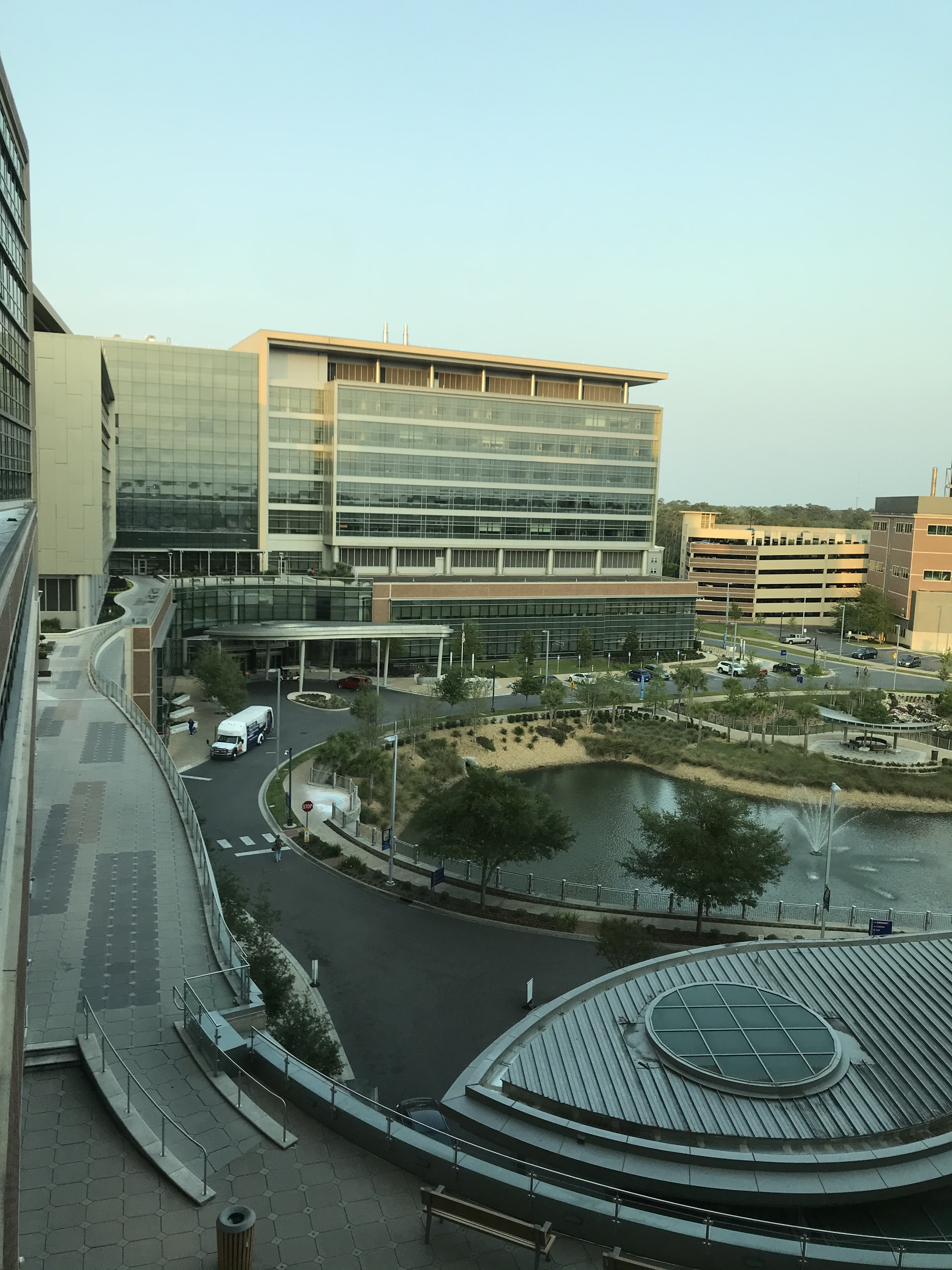
The Heart and Vascular Division of the teaching hospital

== Accreditation ==
The Health Science Center is accredited by the Commission on Colleges of the Southern Association of Colleges and Schools to award baccalaureate, master and doctoral degrees. Each of the professional colleges or programs is accredited by the appropriate agency for the profession or program.

== See also ==
- Buildings at the University of Florida
- J. Hillis Miller Sr.
- McKnight Brain Institute
- University of Florida Cancer Hospital
- University of Florida Health
