= William A. Shands =

American politician

Member of the Florida Senate from the 32nd district
- In office 1940–1958

Personal details
- Born: July 21, 1889 Alachua County, Florida
- Died: January 20, 1973 (aged 83) Gainesville, Florida
- Party: Democratic
- Spouse(s): Catherine London Hawkins, married June 12, 1912
- Education: LL.B., University of Florida
- Occupation: Businessman lawyer

William Augustine Shands (July 21, 1889 – January 20, 1973) was an American politician and elected officeholder. Shands was a long-time Democratic member of the Florida Senate and an advocate for the establishment of a state medical college and teaching hospital.

== Early life and education ==
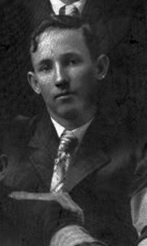
Shands in football team photo.

Shands was born in Alachua County, Florida on July 21, 1889, and moved to Gainesville, Florida with his family in 1901. He attended the University of Florida in Gainesville, where he joined the Kappa Alpha Order fraternity (Beta Zeta chapter). While attending the university, he played for the Florida football and Florida baseball teams. On the football team he was an end and halfback. He left school without graduating which is something he regretted and went into the fertilizer business in Gainesville. He was later inducted into the University of Florida Athletic Hall of Fame as a "distinguished letter winner."

== Business and politics ==
Shands left the university before graduating and began selling agricultural chemicals for the Standard Fertilizer Company He married Catherine London Hawkins of Jacksonville, Florida on June 12, 1912, and then moved to Alabama. He later returned to Gainesville and started the Gainesville Poster-Advertising Company in 1928. He ran and was elected to the Gainesville City Council. He joined the City Charter Commission, and in 1929 was appointed to the State Road Board. In order to further his business and political aspirations, he returned to the University of Florida to study law.

== State senate and legacy ==
After graduating from the University of Florida with his bachelor of laws degree, Shands was elected to the Florida Senate in 1940, representing the 32nd District centered on Gainesville in north central Florida. Shands was later selected by his colleagues to serve as the president of the Florida Senate during the 1957 session of the legislature.

Shands was a Democratic candidate for Florida Governor in 1948, but lost the Democratic Party primary to the eventual general election winner, Fuller Warren. During the primary campaign, Shands advocated the adoption of a state sales tax, which was opposed by Warren. The Florida Legislature adopted Shands' sales tax proposal over Warren's objections in the following session of the Florida Legislature, and it has remained the mainstay of state revenue ever since. Shands was a member of the Pork Chop Gang, a group of legislators from rural areas that dominated the state legislature due to malapportionment and used their power to engage in McCarthyist tactics.

Shands became a forceful advocate of establishing a state-funded medical and teaching hospital at the University of Florida. The University of Florida College of Medicine opened in 1956. Two years later, the University of Florida Teaching Hospital opened on October 20, 1958. In 1965, it was renamed the "William A. Shands Teaching Hospital and Clinics" in his honor. The hospital is often referred to as "Shands Hospital," and is part of the Shands HealthCare network.

Shands was initiated as an honorary member of the Alpha Phi chapter of Alpha Kappa Psi Professional Business Fraternity in 1955.

Shands died in Gainesville in January 1973; he was 83 years old.

== See also ==
- Florida Gators
- Florida Gators football, 1906–09
- History of the University of Florida
- List of Kappa Alpha Order members
- List of Levin College of Law graduates
- List of University of Florida alumni
- List of University of Florida Athletic Hall of Fame members
- List of University of Florida honorary degree recipients
