= Thomas D. Schmittgen =

American pharmacologist

- Born: 1959 (age 66–67); Lorain, Ohio, USA
- Spouse: Janet Wadolny (m. 1986)

Academic background
- Education: BSc, 1985, PhD, Pharmaceutics, 1992, Ohio State University
- Thesis: Pharmacodynamics of antiproliferative agents in patient and rodent tumor explants (1992)

Thomas Donald Schmittgen (born 1959) is an American pharmacologist. He is Chair of Pharmaceutics in the University of Florida College of Pharmacy. In 2020, Schmittgen was elected a Fellow of the American Association for the Advancement of Science for "distinguished contributions to the field of microRNA biology, particularly using real time PCR to quantify microRNA expression in tissues, extracellular vesicles, cell lines and tumors." In 2025, the journal Nature listed Schmittgen's 2001 publication as the second most-cited research article of the 21st century and the fifth most-cited publication of all time.

== Early life and education ==
Schmittgen was born in 1959 to Donald Schmittgen in Lorain, Ohio. He completed his Bachelor of Science and PhD in pharmaceutics at Ohio State University.

== Career ==
Following his PhD, Schmittgen served on the faculty at Washington State University's College of Pharmacy from 1995 to 2002. He then returned to his alma mater in 2002 as chair of the Division of Pharmaceutics.

Schmittgen joined the faculty at the University of Florida College of Pharmacy in 2015 through the UF Preeminence Initiative. As a professor of pharmaceutics, Schmittgen worked on identifying new ways to restore microRNA levels in cancer cells. He was elected a Fellow of the American Association of Pharmaceutical Scientists in 2016 for his research on noncoding RNAs and cancer. In 2018, Schmittgen was appointed chair of the department of pharmaceutics. He was also named the V. Ravi Chandran Professor of Pharmaceutical Sciences in the University of Florida College of Pharmacy. In 2020, Schmittgen was elected a Fellow of the American Association for the Advancement of Science for "distinguished contributions to the field of microRNA biology, particularly using real time PCR to quantify microRNA expression in tissues, extracellular vesicles, cell lines and tumors." In 2025, the journal Nature listed Schmittgen's 2001 publication as the second most-cited research article of the 21st century and the fifth most-cited publication of all time.

== Personal life ==
Schmittgen married Janet Wadolny in 1986.
