= Dustin Pfundheller =

American dentist (born 1987)

- Born: May 16, 1986 (age 40); Altoona, Wisconsin, U.S.
- Occupation: Dentist
- Known for: Being the Most Traveled American
- Website: https://thesmilemission.com/

Dustin Pfundheller (born May 16, 1986) is an American dentist and is recognized as being both the most-traveled American and the most-traveled person under 40 in the world.

== Early life and education ==
Pfundheller was born to Raina and Bob Pfundheller of Altoona, Wisconsin. He attended the University of Wisconsin–River Falls and the University of Florida College of Dentistry.

== Career ==
Pfundheller's career began with a dental practice in Singapore, where he worked for six years. In December 2020, Pfundheller opened a dental clinic focused on affordable access to services in Miami called The Smile Mission.

== Travel and recognition ==
Dustin has visited every country in the world, earning him the Guinness World Record as the youngest person to achieve the milestone in 2017, and has been recognized by travel website, Nomad Mania, as being the most-traveled American and the 8th most-traveled individual in the world having visited 1160 of the 1301 geographic regions defined by the site. His travels were self-funded and he instead made use of the dating app Tinder to assist with making travel arrangements. During his travels, Pfundheller often performed dental services in locations with limited access to the specialization. The last country visited by Pfundheller was Israel, admission to which required taking his case to the country's supreme court.

Pfundheller applauded Malaysia's handling of the COVID-19 pandemic and criticized the news coverage of the situation by Al Jazeera.
