= UF Health Jacksonville =

- University of Florida Health
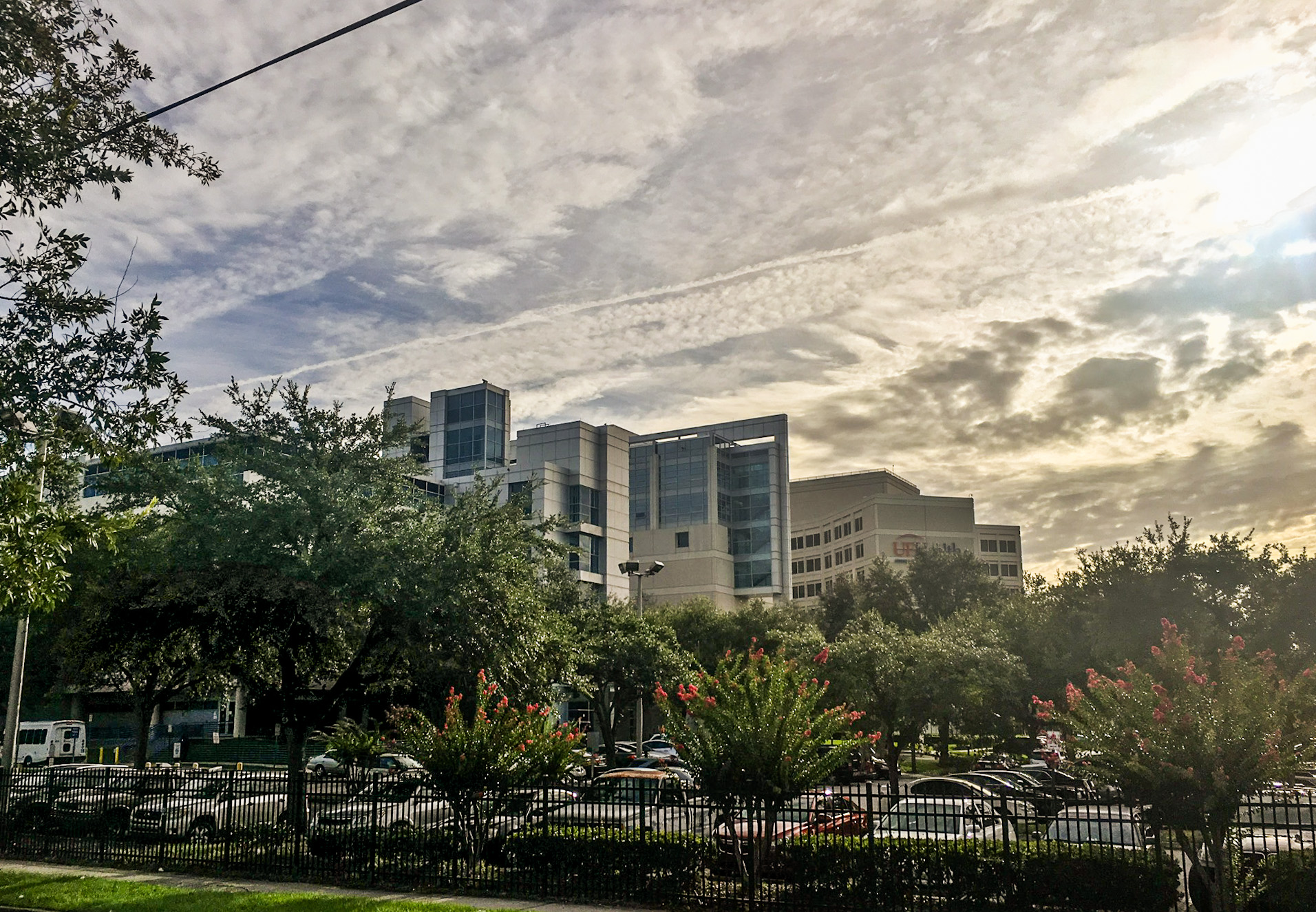
- Hospital in August 2019

Geography
- Location: 655 West 8th Street, Jacksonville, FL 32209, Jacksonville, Florida, United States
- Coordinates: 30.3470°N 81.6635°W

Organization
- Care system: Private
- Type: Teaching
- Affiliated university: University of Florida
- Network: UF Health

Services
- Emergency department: Level I Adult Trauma Center / Level II Pediatric Trauma Center
- Beds: 695

Helipads
- Helipad: Yes

History
- Founded: 1999

Links
- Website: ufhealthjax.org
- Lists: Hospitals in Florida

UF Health Jacksonville is a teaching hospital and medical system of the University of Florida in Jacksonville, Florida, United States. Part of the larger University of Florida Health system, it includes the 695-bed UF Health Jacksonville hospital, the 216-bed UF Health North hospital, associated clinics, and is the Jacksonville campus of UF's Health Science Center. Together with UF Health Shands Hospital in Gainesville, UF Health Jacksonville (formerly Shands Jacksonville) is one of two academic hospitals in the UF Health system, and serves 19 counties in Florida and several in Georgia.

The downtown campus is home to North Florida's Level I trauma center and, in 2006, became home to one of the nation's few proton therapy treatment facilities. In 2018 UF Health Jacksonville was certified as a Comprehensive Stroke Center for its excellence in acute stroke care. Through its association with the University of Florida, it offers classes and degrees through the university's College of Medicine, College of Nursing, and College of Pharmacy.

== History ==
The hospital was created in 1999 when Gainesville-based Shands HealthCare purchased two adjacent medical facilities in Jacksonville—University Medical Center and Methodist Medical Center. The lineage of the hospital can be traced back to 1870 when Jacksonville's first hospital and Florida's first non-military hospital, Duval Hospital and Asylum,.

- 1870 - Duval County Commission acquired property in Jacksonville's Oakland area at Jessie and Franklin St. to construct Duval County Hospital and Asylum. The campus included a wood hospital ward, a brick tuberculosis asylum, a morgue and wash house, a kitchen building and a chicken house.
- 1877 - A more spacious, one-story building, called the "new hospital," was erected, bringing the total to three buildings handling patient intake.
- 1901 - George A. Brewster Hospital and School of Nurse Training, which later became Methodist Hospital, opened to care for victims of the Great Fire of 1901
- 1920 - Duval County Board of Charities assumed control of medical and surgical management at Duval Hospital. At the time, the facility had five physicians: an internist, a surgeon, an otolaryngologist, a neurologist and a dentist.
- 1923 - Construction completed of a 50-bed tuberculosis hospital at West 10th and Jefferson Streets, part of UF Health Jacksonville's current campus, replacing the TB center on the county hospital grounds. The old TB facility is converted to a general hospital. Duval County Hospital and Asylum renamed to Duval County Hospital.
- 1926 - The TB hospital on Jefferson Street was expanded to a $400,000, 200-bed hospital due to the deteriorating condition of the county hospital.
- 1948 - Duval County Hospital became Duval Medical Center (DMC), called the "nation's oldest publicly supported hospital"
- 1963 - Florida Legislature created the Duval County Hospital Authority to facilitate the construction of a new hospital and manage DMC.
- 1964 - Duval County medical and governmental leaders successfully lobbied for the passage of a $20-million bond issue. Planning began for a new hospital to double the existing facility.
- 1966 - Brewster Hospital and School of Nurse Training closed.
- 1967 - Brewster Hospital moved to Jefferson and W. 8th St., the current location of UF Health Jacksonville, and reopened as the not-for-profit Methodist Hospital. Duval Medical Center, in an effort to combat only 25 percent of its resident physician roles being filled, hired surgeon Dr. Sam Stephenson of Vanderbilt University as the first of 30 notable physician educators on faculty. The program initiated DMC's relationship with the University of Florida College of Medicine, and made DMC one of the first non-university-based hospitals in the nation to employ full-time faculty physicians.
- 1971 - DMC moved to a new eight-story, $26 million, 485-bed, state-of-the-art medical facility across the street from Methodist Hospital and changed its name to University Hospital. By this time, the physician training program had 118 intern and resident physicians enrolled from 29 countries. In addition, the hospital offered training programs for radiologic technologists and surgical technologists, continuing medical education, and training for nursing students at UF, Florida Junior College and Florida A&M University.
- 1982 - University Hospital became a private, not-for-profit facility and contracted with the city of Jacksonville to provide care for the uninsured
- 1983 - University Hospital opened the first Level I trauma center in Florida
- 1985 - University Hospital was designated an affiliate of the University of Florida. TraumaOne, their helicopter ambulance service, began operations
- 1988 - Methodist Hospital was renamed Methodist Medical Center(MMC) - University Hospital was designated the Jacksonville campus for the UF Health Science Center
- 1989 - University Hospital was renamed University Medical Center (UMC)
- 1999 - UMC and MMC were purchased by Shands HealthCare and merged to become Shands Jacksonville Medical Center
- 2006 - The University of Florida opened the UF Proton Therapy Institute on the Shands Jacksonville campus
- 2011 - Shands Jacksonville received Magnet recognition by the American Nurses Credentialing Center
- 2013 - Shands Jacksonville Medical Center was renamed UF Health Jacksonville
- 2015 - UF Health Jacksonville opened an outpatient medical complex in North Jacksonville, UF Health North, which includes an emergency room, midwife-led birth center, surgery, imaging, cath lab, rehabilitation and other outpatient services
- 2017 - A 92-bed hospital tower was opened at UF Health North
- 2018 - Certified as a comprehensive stroke center.

== See also ==
- University of Florida College of Medicine-Jacksonville
