= UF Health Shands Cancer Hospital =

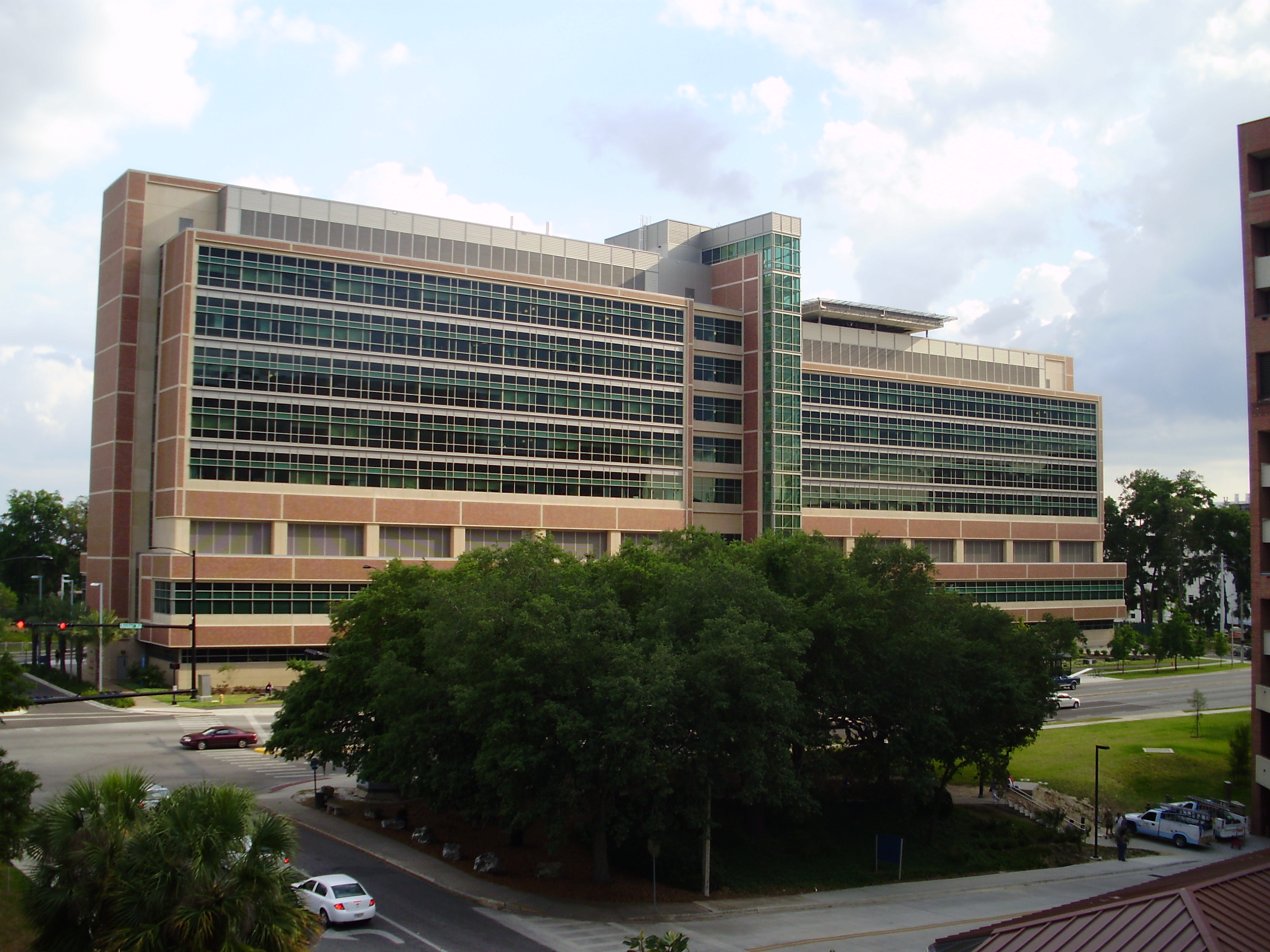

Geography
- Location: Gainesville, Florida, United States
- Coordinates: 29.6389°N 82.3422°W

Organization
- Care system: Non-Profit
- Type: Teaching
- Affiliated university: Shands

Services
- Emergency department: Yes
- Beds: 192
- Speciality: Cancer hospital

History
- Founded: 2009

Links
- Website: http://cancer.ufl.edu/
- Lists: Hospitals in Florida

UF Health Shands Cancer Hospital is an academic cancer center in Gainesville, Florida. The 200 bed complex focuses on producing basic laboratory findings that will ultimately be used for preventive therapies for cancers.

== Background ==
This complex is eight stories high, and contains over 500,000 square feet (46,000 m^{2}) of space. The facility houses about 200 private inpatient beds for a variety of patients, including those receiving diagnostic and therapeutic oncology services. It also includes a Critical Care Center for emergency and trauma related services. Designed by Flad Architects and built by SkanskaUSA, construction was completed in 2009 and cost $388 million.

== See also ==
- University of Florida
- Shands at the University of Florida
- University of Florida College of Medicine
- J. Hillis Miller Health Science Center
- Buildings at the University of Florida
