= University of Florida College of Public Health and Health Professions =

Academic college in Gainesville, Florida, US

College of Public Health and Health Professions
- Type: School of public health
- Established: 1958
- Parent institution: University of Florida
- Dean: Beth Virnig
- Location: Gainesville, Florida, U.S.
- Website: phhp.ufl.edu

The College of Public Health and Health Professions is the public health school of the University of Florida.

The college was established by the Florida Board of Regents in 1958 as a separate school within the J. Hillis Miller Health Science Center and is a member of the Association of Schools and Programs of Public Health and the Council on Education for Public Health. The college grants bachelor's, master's and doctoral degrees.

== History ==
The College of Public Health and Health Professions was established by the Florida Board of Regents in 1958 as a separate school within the J. Hillis Miller Health Science Center of the University of Florida.

For fiscal year 2023, the college received $54.8 million in new research awards.

== Academics ==
The college grants bachelor's, master's and doctoral degrees.

=== Departments ===
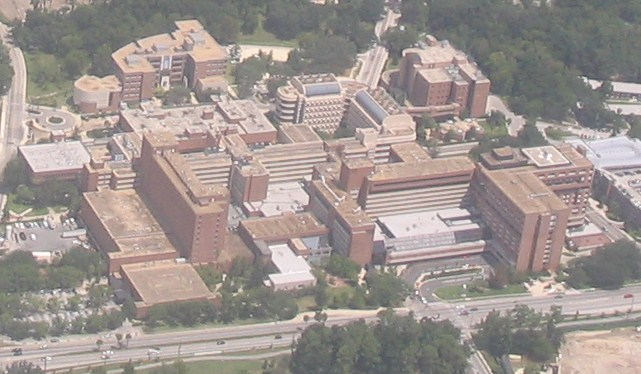
The college is part of the Health Science Center

There are eight departments within the college:

- Biostatistics
- Clinical and Health Psychology
- Environmental and Global Health
- Epidemiology
- Health Services Research, Management and Policy
- Occupational Therapy
- Physical Therapy
- Speech, Language and Hearing Sciences

=== Rankings ===
Following are the College of Public Health and Health Professional's national rankings according to U.S. News & World Report Best Colleges Ranking in 2024.

Department	Ranking
Audiology	34th
Clinical psychology	27
Health care management	32
Occupational therapy	11
Physical therapy	11th
Public health	38th
Speech pathology	29

=== Acreditation ===
It is a member of the Association of Schools and Programs of Public Health and the Council on Education for Public Health.

== See also ==
- University of Florida College of Dentistry
- University of Florida College of Medicine
- University of Florida College of Nursing
- University of Florida College of Pharmacy
- University of Florida College of Veterinary Medicine
