= University of Florida College of Veterinary Medicine =

School of the U of F in Gainesville, Florida

College of Veterinary Medicine
- Type: Public veterinary school
- Established: 1976
- Parent institution: University of Florida
- Dean: Dana Zimmel, DVM
- Students: 516
- Undergraduates: 0
- Location: Gainesville, Florida, United States
- Website: vetmed.ufl.edu

The University of Florida College of Veterinary Medicine is the veterinary school of the University of Florida in Gainesville, Florida.

== Academics ==
The College of Veterinary Medicine received $15.6 million in annual research revenue in 2024.

The College of Veterinary Medicine offers the Doctor of Veterinary Medicine degree on campus. As of 2021, the current DVM enrollment includes 455 students. Fifty one students attend the college on campus for the graduate programs for their masters or Doctor of Philosophy degrees. 465 students are enrolled in the college's online masters program.

The UF Veterinary Hospitals include the UF Small Animal Hospital and the UF Large Animal Hospital in Gainesville, and UF Pet Emergency Treatment Services (PETS) and UF Veterinary Hospital at World Equestrian Center (opening spring 2022) in Ocala. The UF Veterinary Hospitals are a major animal referral center in the Southeast. An estimated 44,000 animals are seen and treated each year at the UF Veterinary Hospitals and through field visits.

In the 2019 U.S. News & World Report rankings, the college ranked 9th overall amongst all veterinary medicine colleges.

== Facility images ==
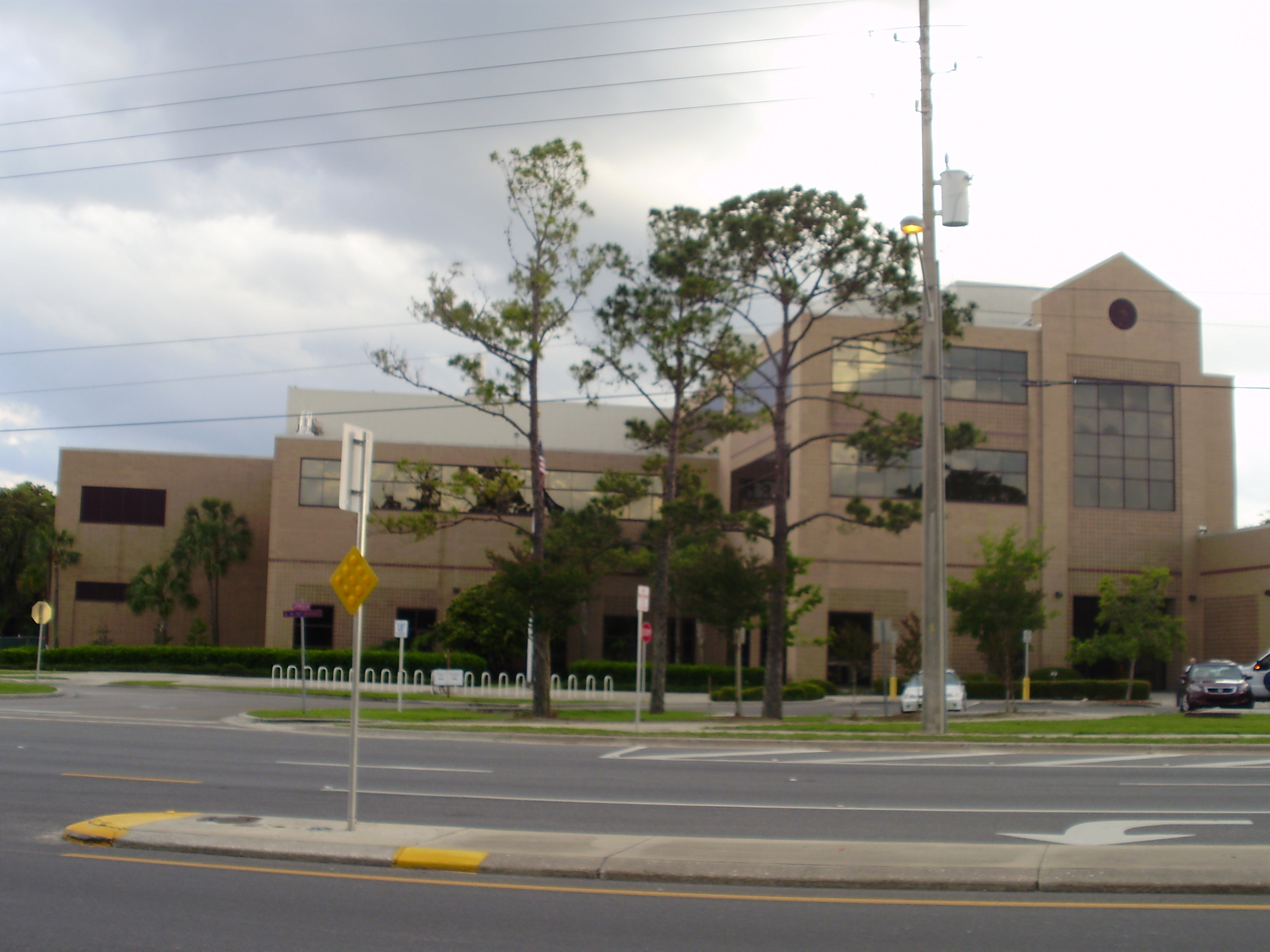
Veterinary Academic Building

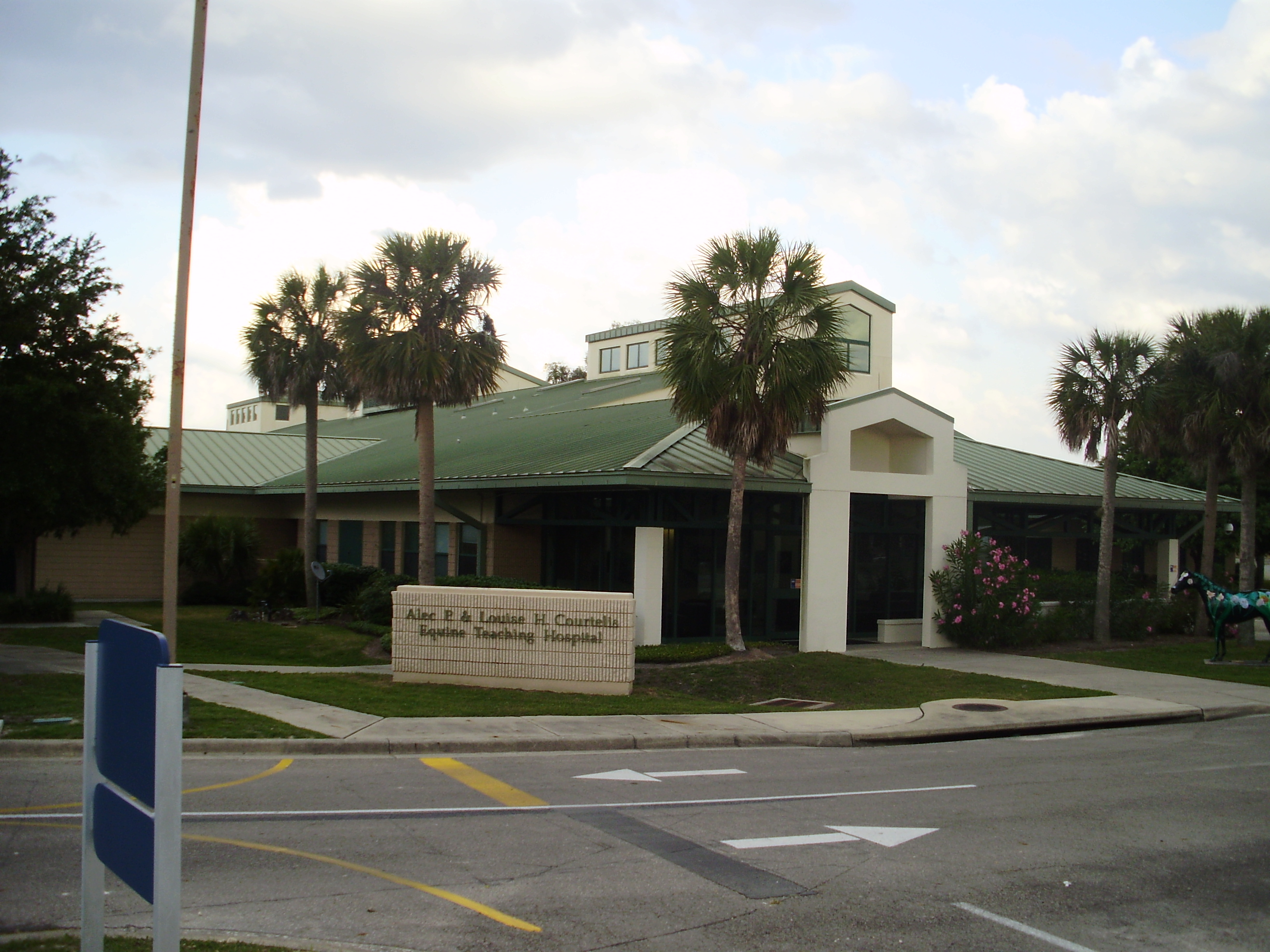
UF Large Animal Hospital

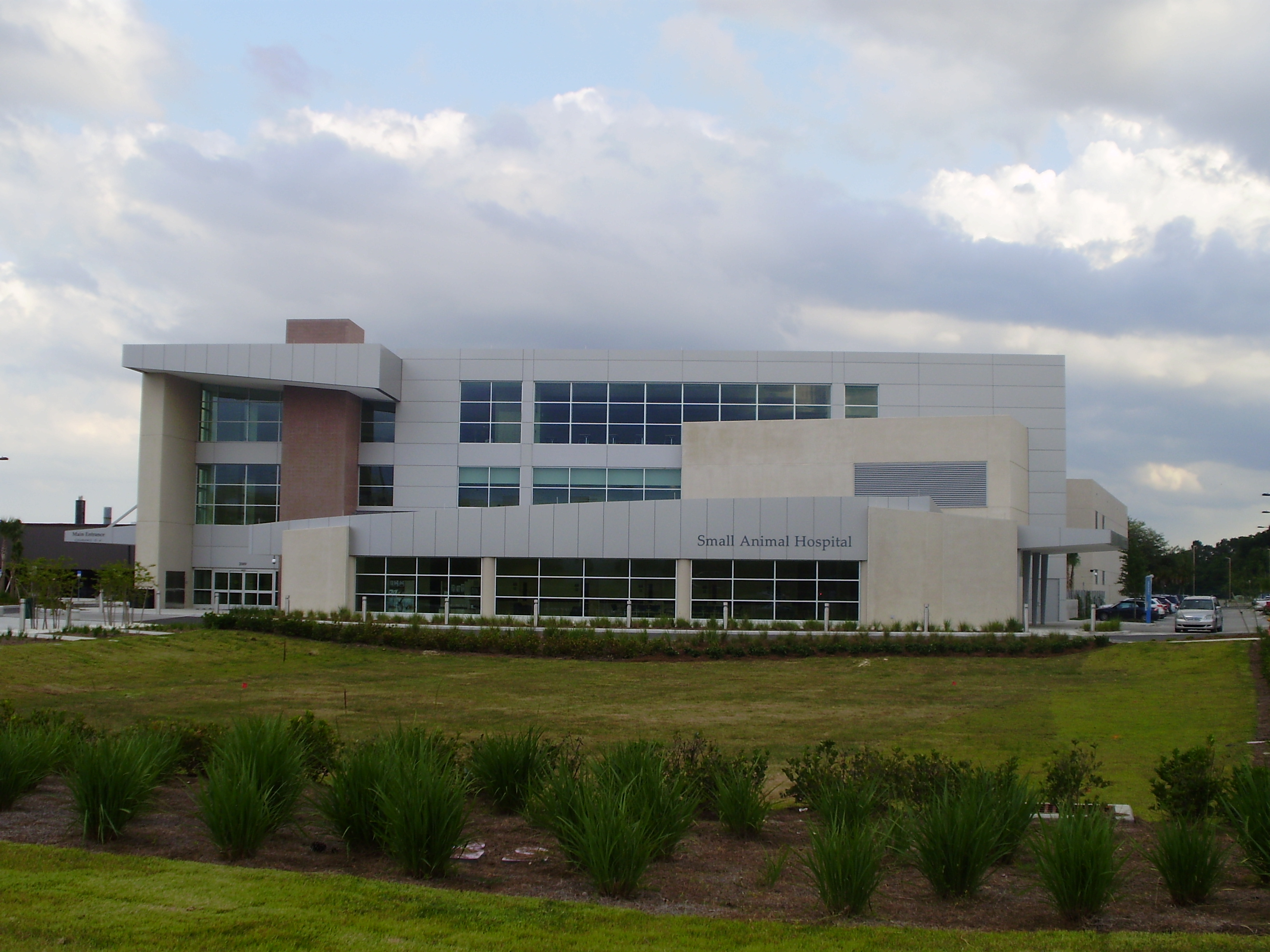
UF Small Animal Hospital

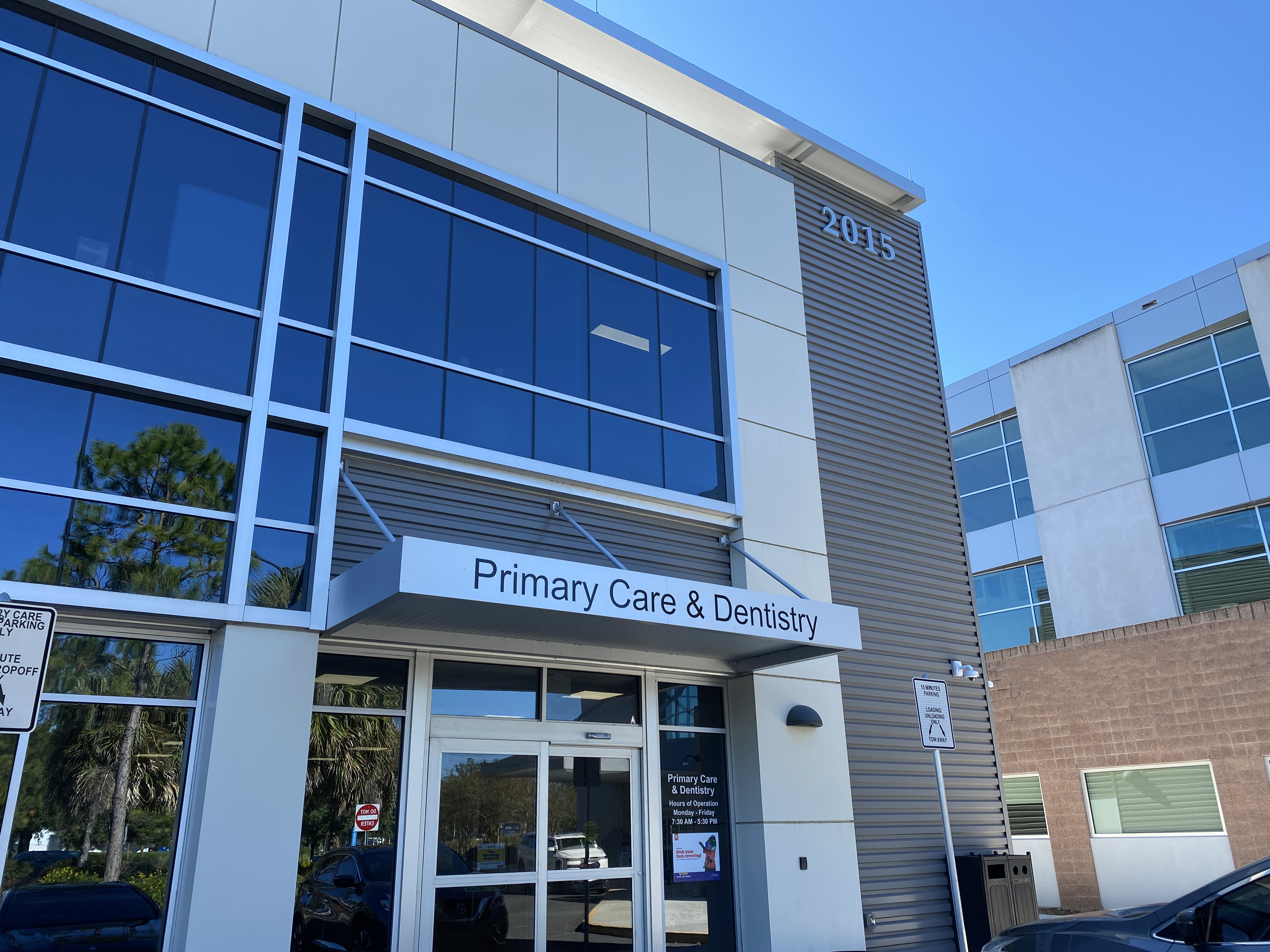
UF SAH Primary Care & Dentistry

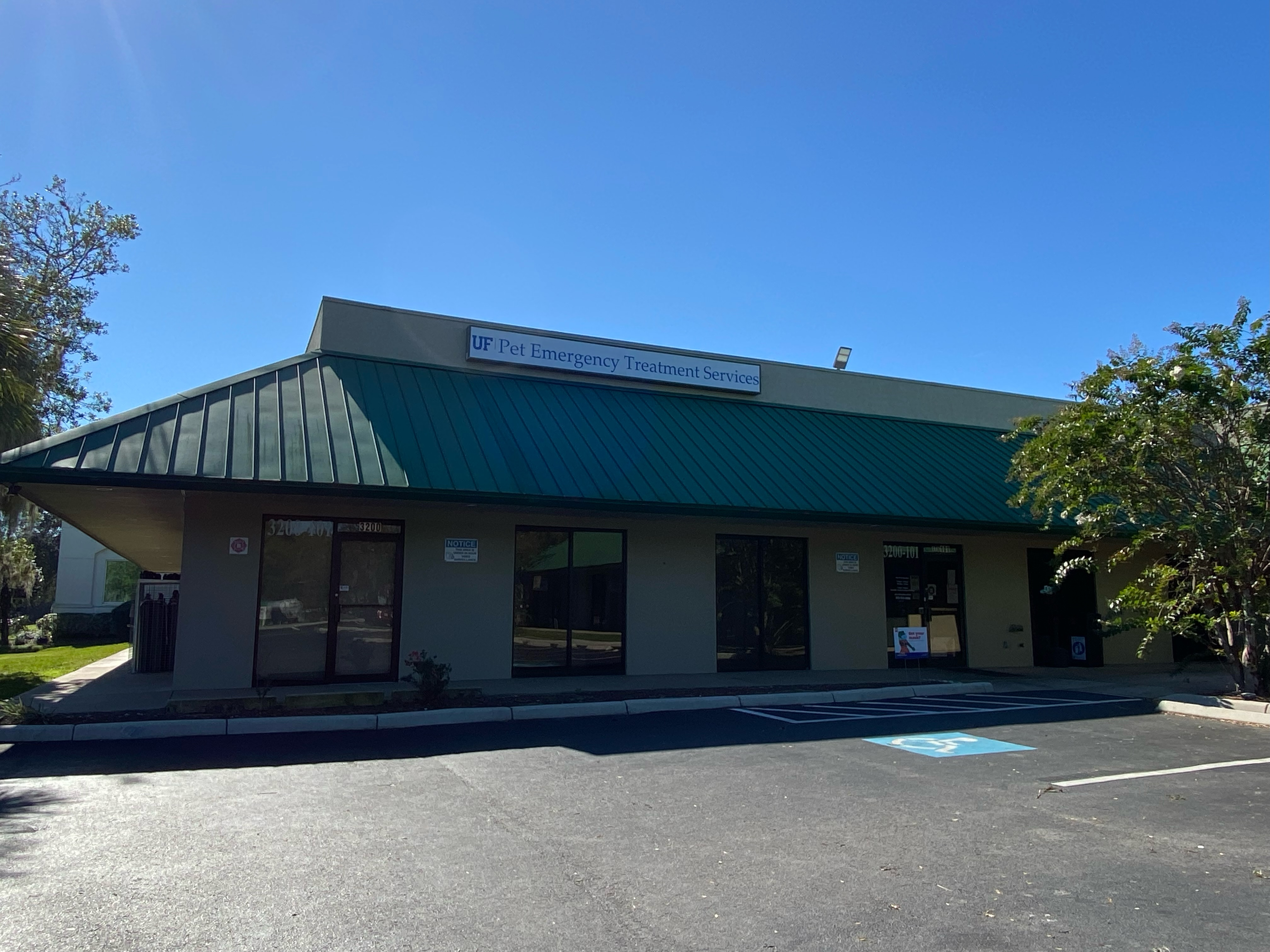
UF Pet Emergency Treatment Services (Ocala, FL)

== See also ==
- University of Florida College of Dentistry
- University of Florida College of Medicine
- University of Florida College of Nursing
- University of Florida College of Pharmacy
- University of Florida College of Public Health and Health Professions
