= University of Florida College of Dentistry =

Dentistry school in Gainesville, Florida

- Type: Public dental school
- Established: 1972
- Parent institution: University of Florida
- Dean: Isabel Garcia
- Faculty: 133
- Students: 365 DMD Students
- Location: Gainesville, Florida, United States
- Website: dental.ufl.edu

The University of Florida College of Dentistry is the dental school of the University of Florida.

The college is located in the Dental Sciences Building on the southeastern edge of the university's Gainesville, Florida main campus. The college is one of the six academic colleges and schools that comprise the university's J. Hillis Miller Health Science Center. The college is the only publicly funded dental school in the state of Florida. As of 2019, there were 365 DMD students enrolled in the college, and the college employed 133 faculty members and 148 residents/interns/fellows.

== Research ==
For fiscal year 2024, the college received over $14.4 million in total research grants.

== Rankings ==
In the 2017 QS World University Rankings the college ranked 47th overall amongst all dentistry colleges across the globe.

QS World Rankings (2017)
Global Dentistry Ranking	47

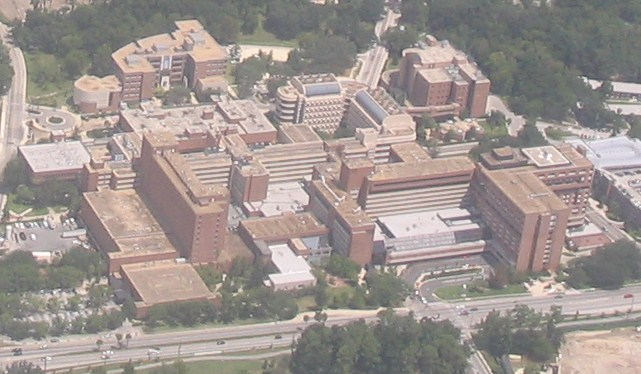
The college is part of the Health Science Center.

== See also ==
- University of Florida College of Medicine
- University of Florida College of Nursing
- University of Florida College of Pharmacy
- University of Florida College of Public Health and Health Professions
- University of Florida College of Veterinary Medicine
