= Shands, California =

Shands
- Former settlement
- Location in California
- Coordinates: 39°25′31″N 120°46′51″W
- Country: United States
- State: California
- County: Nevada County
- Elevation: 4,636 ft (1,413 m)

Shands was a settlement in Nevada County in the U.S. state of California, located on the San Juan Ridge, about 2 1/2 miles west of Graniteville, and just northeast of the intersection of the present-day North Bloomfield – Graniteville Road and Spanish Mine Road, near Cherry Hill. The site is at an elevation of 4636 feet.

There is little in the historical record about the settlement and what there is, is not always consistent. As best as can be determined, a Canadian named John Shand [sometimes spelled Shann], established a store in the locality before November 20, 1853, as there are references to Shand's store in local newspapers. Among other things, he grew produce to sell to miners.

At around the same time, Ann [sometimes spelled Anne] Adams McDonnel and Richard William McDonnel arrived in California from England and moved to the Graniteville area where Richard became a miner. In the spring of 1853, Richard left home to go to Marysville for provisions and is believed to have died while trying to cross the swollen Yuba River. To support herself and her young daughter Emily, Ann opened a boarding house. She was acknowledged to be a “splendid cook“. In 1856, she married John Shand. Sometime prior to 1859, John and Ann acquired a new home in the area where the Eureka Lake and Water Company was preparing to construct a new flume, and opened a boarding house.

Under the direction of French engineer Benoit Faucherie, the Magenta Flume, 7 feet wide, 1400 feet long and 165 feet high was constructed across the valley leading to Cherry Hill. During the construction process, Ann fed the workmen. Thereafter, her boarding house became known as Magenta House. In the 1860s, with the rise in importance of the Henness Pass Road between Marysville and the Territory, later State, of Nevada, Magenta House became an important stop for travelers. The place was very popular, in large part because of Ann's dedication. There is a report of a wagon train arriving at 4 AM and being so impressed by Ann's service that each man gave Ann a five dollar gold piece.

Described as a "landmark of the pioneer days" Magenta House was an impressive establishment. It had a dining room that could serve 30 people at a setting and an upstairs bedroom with 24 straw beds on each side. It had a barn that could accommodate 60 horses as well as pens for various animals. It had its own vegetable garden and fruit trees, with a sophisticated watering system fed by a large tank built on the side of the hill.

In addition to the important travel stop, there was also some mining and lumbering around Shands. Shands was located on one of the gold-bearing gravel channels that ran down the San Juan Ridge. Lindgren reports small areas of gravel at Shands “100 feet thick, composed of well-washed pebbles and covered by subangular gravel.” Shands was also connected to the world's first long-distance telephone line which connected all the mining towns on the ridge.

There is an interesting report of an argument between John Shand and an unidentified person. Ann came to John's assistance whereupon the assailant turned on her. John drew his pistol and killed the assailant. John was not arrested.

John Shand died in the late 1860s. Ann continued to run the Magenta House. In 1874, she petitioned the county for $5100 (~$127,226 in 2024) in claimed damages to her water tank. In 1875, she married Michael Quinn. The Quinns continued to operate the Magenta House, and there is a reference to Shands being called Quinns Ranch. Ann died in 1899 and was buried in the North Bloomfield cemetery. Magenta House then passed to her son W. G. Shand, who lived in Graniteville. Michael Quinn continued to operate the inn until his health began to decline around 1908, at which point the inn was operated by a Chinese cook, known as "Charley Rabb." In 1915, Michael moved to the Masonic home in Alameda to "spend the rest of his days."

Interviewed in 1947, Ann Shand's granddaughter, Anna Loomis, confirmed many of the facts reported above. She particularly mentioned that her grandmother was an excellent cook noted for her hospitality. She stated that the Magenta House still stood but others lived there and the flume had been replaced by a water pipe line.
