= List of Kappa Alpha Order members =

This is a list of notable alumni of Kappa Alpha Order.

== Business ==
- Robert Crandall (Alpha Zeta) – former president, chairman and CEO of American Airlines
- Ken May (Gamma Gamma) – CEO of FedEx and Kinko's
- Jerry Richardson (Delta) – former Carolina Panthers owner and founder
- George W. Woodruff (Alpha Sigma) – director of the Coca-Cola Company, 1936–1985
- Robert W. Woodruff (Epsilon) – president of the Coca-Cola Company, 1926–1954
- Jeffery Hildebrand (Omicron) – founder, chairman, and CEO Hilcorp Energy Company
- John Fishwick (Beta Rho) – American railroad executive and chief executive of Norfolk and Western Railway
- Ely Callaway Jr. (Epsilon) – American entrepreneur, textiles executive, winemaker and vintner and golf club manufacturer, as the founder of Callaway Golf

== Education ==
- William James Barrow (Zeta) – chemist and paper conservator
- Andrew Nelson Lytle (Chi) – novelist, dramatist, essayist, professor of literature at the University of Florida and the University of the South
- John B. Watson (Iota) – psychologist, founder of behaviorism
- Sam S. Walker (Beta Commission) – U.S. Army general, superintendent of Virginia Military Institute.

== Media or performance ==
- Michael Beck (Alpha Mu) – actor
- Pat Boone (Gamma Lambda) – actor and recording artist
- Marty Brennaman (Zeta) – announcer for the Cincinnati Reds
- Zac Brown (Zeta Kappa) – lead vocalist with the multiple Grammy-winning country group the Zac Brown Band
- Michael Brun (Sigma) – DJ and producer
- Thomas Dixon, Jr. (Tau) – author, playwright
- Bill Engvall (Xi) – actor and comedian
- Ben Ferguson (Alpha Upsilon) – conservative radio talk show host, author
- Ryan Fournier (Zeta Psi) - American political commentator
- John Temple Graves – newspaper editor
- George Grizzard (Upsilon) – actor, won Tony Award in 1996
- Taylor Hackford (Beta Sigma) – film director, won Oscar in 1979
- George Hamilton IV (Upsilon) – country music singer
- Rob Huebel (Delta Omicron) – comedian and actor
- Adam Johnson (Epsilon Omega) – writer, 2013 fiction Pulitzer Prize
- William Joyce (Beta Lambda) – author, artist, illustrator with Disney/Pixar and others
- Bill Lawrence (Alpha Zeta) – television writer, producer, and director
- Delbert Mann (Chi) – film director, won an Oscar and Palme d'Or in 1955
- Frank McCarthy (Beta) – movie producer, won an Oscar in 1970
- Page McConnell (Beta Lambda) – member of music groups Phish and Vida Blue
- Richard Moll (Alpha Xi) – actor, played "Bull Shannon" on Night Court
- Rich O'Toole (Epsilon Delta) – country music singer
- Anthony Perkins (Alpha Psi) – prolific actor, played Norman Bates in Psycho
- Mark Povinelli (Epsilon Lambda) – actor
- Charlie Rose (Alpha Phi) – talk show host
- Randolph Scott (Alpha Sigma) – actor
- Ned Vaughn (Phi) – actor
- Mark L. Walberg (Delta Tau) – television host
- Douglass Wallop (Beta Kappa) – writer, won Tony Award in 1956

== Military ==
- Adm. Richard E. Byrd (Beta) – US Navy, Antarctic explorer; Medal of Honor recipient
- Edgar Erskine Hume (Omega) - American physician, highly decorated Major General in the U.S. Army medical corps, Founder Delta Omega
- Whitfield Jack (Alpha Iota) – United States Army officer in World War II; major general of United States Army Reserve, attorney in Shreveport (Louisiana)
- Gen. George S. Patton (Beta) – former commander, 3rd US. Army
- Gen. J. H. Binford Peay III (Beta) – former commander, 101st Airborne Division, US CENTCOM; Superintendent of VMI
- Gen. Lemuel C. Shepherd, Jr. (Beta) – former Commandant of the United States Marine Corps
- Richard Truly (Alpha Sigma) – vice admiral, US Navy; astronaut; former director of NASA
- Gen. Sam S. Walker (Beta Commission) – army officer, superintendent of VMI.

== Politics and law ==
- John Abercrombie - US Congressman from Alabama
- Thurman Adams (Beta Epsilon) – former senator and President Pro Tempore of state senate (Delaware)
- Robert Aderholt (Phi) – US Congressman from Alabama
- Carl Albert (Beta Eta) – former US Representative for Oklahoma; Speaker of the House, 1971–1977
- Paul Atkins (Delta) – former commissioner of the US Securities and Exchange Commission
- Roger Bedford, Jr. (Alpha Beta) – state senator, Alabama
- Roy Blunt (Alpha Eta) – US Congressman and senator from Missouri
- J. Caleb Boggs (Beta Epsilon) – former governor and US Senator from Delaware
- Rick Boucher (Beta Rho) – US Congressman from Virginia
- Charles Boustany (Gamma Phi) – US Congressman from Louisiana
- Thomas Carmody (Alpha Gamma) – state representative from Louisiana
- William Clements (Beta Lambda) – former governor of Texas
- Clark M. Clifford (Beta Theta) – former counsel to US presidents Truman, Eisenhower and Kennedy; former secretary of defense
- Larry Combest (Gamma Chi) – US Congressman from Texas
- Zel M. Fischer (Alpha Delta) – judge, Missouri Supreme Court
- Don Fowler (Delta) – former chairman of the Democratic National Committee
- Bart Gordon (Delta Lambda) – US Congressman from Tennessee
- Henry Hager (Tau) – husband of Jenna Bush, daughter of US President George W. Bush
- William Pike Hall Sr. (Alpha Iota) – member of the Louisiana State Senate from Shreveport, 1924–1932
- Stumpy Harris – (Beta Zeta) Attorney, major donor and supporter of the Florida Gators.
- Robert W. Hemphill (Rho) – former US Congressman from South Carolina, 1957–1964; Federal Judge for South Carolina, 1965–1980
- George Hooks (Nu) – senator of Georgia
- J. Edgar Hoover (Alpha Nu) – former director of the Federal Bureau of Investigation
- Richard Hudson (Epsilon Xi) – US Congressman from North Carolina
- Joe Kennedy III (Alpha Pi) - Member of the U.S. House of Representatives from Massachusetts's 4th district
- Bill Lee (Nu) – Governor of Tennessee
- Buddy MacKay (Beta Zeta) – former governor, lieutenant governor, and US Representative from Florida
- James MacKay (Epsilon) – senator
- GA George C. Marshall (Beta) – former US Secretary of State; former US Secretary of Defense; former US Army Chief of Staff' namesake of the Marshall Plan; Nobel Peace Prize recipient; graduate of the Virginia Military Institute
- Henry McMaster (Rho) – Governor of South Carolina
- Daniel Mongiardo (Alpha Theta) – Lt. Governor of Kentucky, 2007–2011
- G.V. "Sonny" Montgomery (Beta Tau) – former US Congressman, author of the GI Bill of Rights
- Alex Murdaugh (Rho) – Former attorney, convicted of capital murder in March 2023.
- Bill Owens (Delta Kappa) – former governor of Colorado
- Austin Peay (Omega) – former governor of Tennessee
- Claude Pepper (Alpha Omega) – former US Congressman from Florida; former US Senator from Florida
- Melvin Purvis (Rho) – FBI; headed the Division of Investigation Offices in Birmingham, Alabama; led successful manhunts for Pretty Boy Floyd, Baby Face Nelson, and John Dillinger
- Dean Rusk (Sigma) – former US Secretary of State
- Ellison D. Smith (Delta/Rho) – US Senator, South Carolina
- Floyd Spence (Rho) – US Congressman from South Carolina
- Earl Ray Tomblin (Alpha Rho) – Governor of West Virginia
- Steve Womack (Epsilon Zeta) – US Congressman from Arkansas

== Religion ==
- Rt. Rev. James L. Duncan (Kappa) – former bishop, Episcopal Diocese of Southeast Florida
- Rt. Rev. Henry Judah Mikell (Alpha Alpha) – former bishop, Episcopal Diocese of Atlanta
- Rt. Rev. William J. Skilton (Theta Commission) – former suffragan bishop Episcopal Diocese of South Carolina, former assistant bishop Episcopal Diocese of the Dominican Republic
- Rt. Rev William Angie Smith (Xi) - former Methodist bishop of the Oklahoma-New Mexico episcopal area

== Sports ==
- Tommy Aaron (Beta Zeta) – professional golfer; 1973 Masters Champion
- Tony Azevedo (Alpha Pi) – water polo player; four-time All-American; three-time National Player of the Year; three-time Olympian
- Bill Bergey (Delta Eta) – four-time All-Pro player; member of the Philadelphia Eagles Honor Roll
- David Binn (Alpha Xi) – San Diego Chargers, long snapper, 1994–2011
- Randy Brown – California Angels catcher
- Rex Cawley (Beta Sigma) – Olympic gold medalist (1964) and former world record holder, 400m hurdles
- Ben Crenshaw (Omicron) – professional golfer and Master's champion in 1984 and 1995
- Al Geiberger (Beta Sigma) – professional golfer
- Burt Hooton (Omicron) – former Major League Baseball player and coach
- Don January (Gamma Lambda) – professional golfer
- Paul Johnson (Delta Alpha) – head football coach for Georgia Tech
- Christian "Sonny" Jurgensen III (Alpha Phi) – former professional football player, Pro Football Hall of Fame inductee
- Joe Kapp (Alpha Xi) – former professional football player, College Football Hall of Fame inductee
- Clyde Littlefield (Omicron) – former University of Texas football and track & field coach
- Jack Maguire (Gamma Eta) – professional golfer
- Tim McCarver (Gamma Gamma) – former professional baseball player
- Hal Mumme (Delta Rho) – head football coach, New Mexico State University
- Will Muschamp (Gamma) – co-Defensive Coordinator, University of Georgia
- Ernest Nevers (Alpha Pi) – former professional baseball and football player, Pro Football Hall of Fame inductee
- Tommy Nobis (Omicron) – former professional football player with Atlanta Falcons; University of Texas All-American; 1965 winner of the Outland Trophy & Maxwell Award
- Charles Paddock (Beta Sigma) – three-time Olympic gold medalist, track & field
- Jerry Richardson (Delta) – Wofford College receiver – Associated Press Little All-America selection in 1957 & 1958; former professional football player with Baltimore Colts; former owner of the NFL Carolina Panthers
- Jackson Scholz, 1920/24/28 Olympic sprinter, sports fiction author, portrayed in Chariots of Fire (1981)
- Jay Sigel (Tau) – professional golfer
- Brandt Snedeker (Chi) – professional golfer
- Melvin Stewart (Pi) – Olympic gold medalist, swimming
- Dave Stockton (Beta Sigma) – professional golfer
- Danny Sullivan (Theta) – Formula One and Indycar driver, 1985 Indianapolis 500 Winner
- William Vlachos (Alpha Beta) – All-American Center and two time (2009, 2011) National Champion for the Alabama Crimson Tide
- Sam Wyche (Iota) – former NFL head coach; NFL analyst
- Frank Wykoff (Beta Sigma) – Olympic gold medalist, 1928, 1932, 1936, in track & field
- Ernie Zampese (Beta Sigma) – NFL offensive coordinator who helped pioneer the west coast offense
- Jason Collins (Alpha Pi) - NBA player and first male player of any major American pro sports team to come out as gay
