= Colleen G. Koch =

American cardiothoracic anesthesiologist and academic administrator

- Education: University of Cincinnati; University of Michigan; Case Western Reserve University
- Scientific career
- Fields: Cardiothoracic anesthesiology
- Workplaces: Cleveland Clinic; Johns Hopkins University; University of Florida

Colleen Gorman Koch is an American cardiothoracic anesthesiologist and academic administrator who served as the tenth dean of the University of Florida College of Medicine from 2021 to 2023.

== Life ==
Koch received a M.D. from the University of Cincinnati. She conducted anesthesiology training at the Brigham and Women's Hospital. She completed a M.S. in clinical research design and statistical analysis at the University of Michigan School of Public Health. She earned a M.B.A. from the Weatherhead School of Management at Case Western Reserve University.

Koch is a cardiothoracic anesthesiologist. she worked at the Cleveland Clinic for 22 years. In 2014, she joined the Johns Hopkins School of Medicine as a professor and chair of the department of anesthesiology and critical care medicine. Koch was the anesthesiologist-in-chief of the Johns Hopkins Hospital. From 2021 to 2023, she served as the tenth dean of the University of Florida College of Medicine. She was the first woman to serve in the role.
