= UF Health Shands Hospital =

- UF Health

Geography
- Location: 1600 SW Archer Road, Gainesville, Florida, United States
- Coordinates: 29.6399°N 82.3431°W

Organization
- Type: Teaching hospital

Services
- Emergency department: Level I Adult Trauma Center / Level I Pediatric Trauma Center
- Beds: 1,054

History
- Founded: 1958

Links
- Website: ufhealth.org/locations/uf-health-shands-hospital
- Lists: Hospitals in Florida

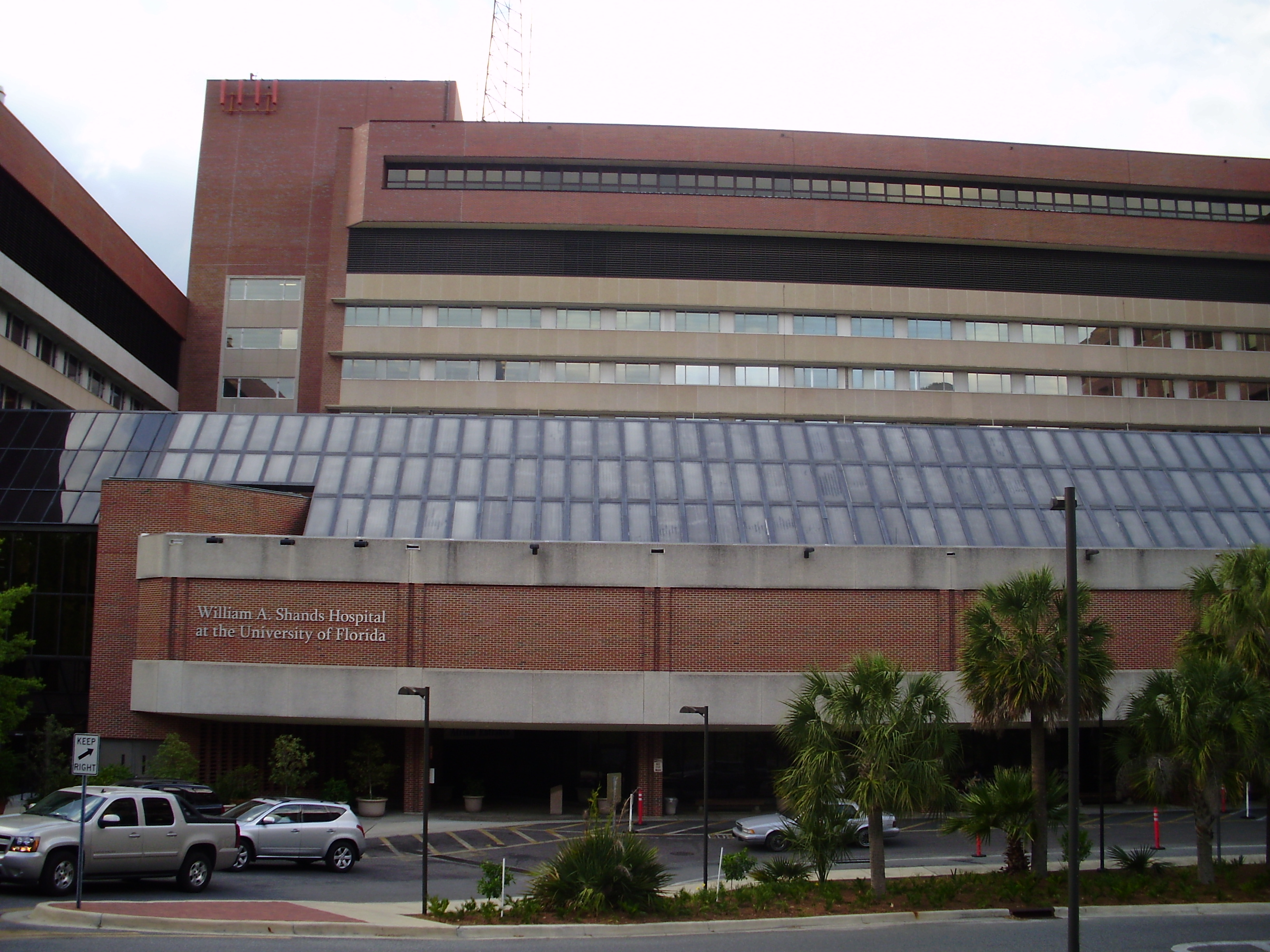
Patient Services Building

UF Health Shands Hospital is a teaching hospital of the University of Florida in Gainesville, Florida. It is one of seven hospitals in the University of Florida Health system, and one of two campuses for UF's Health Science Center, the other being UF Health Jacksonville.

== History ==
William A. Shands was a Florida state Senator, elected from the 32nd District in the mid-1940s. He was convinced that the best way to enhance the Gainesville community was to establish a teaching hospital at the University of Florida. There was general agreement that the state needed a teaching hospital, but located in a large city, such as Jacksonville, Miami or Tampa. His dedicated efforts were critical to obtaining state funding for a teaching hospital in Gainesville. The University of Florida Colleges of Medicine and Nursing opened in 1956. Two years later, on October 20, 1958, the UF Teaching Hospital was started. In 1965, it was renamed W. A. Shands Teaching Hospital and Clinics to honor Shands' work in making the facility a reality. The institution later became Shands Hospital, part of the Shands HealthCare network.

As part of the University of Florida Health Science Center, the hospital is a 1,111-bed tertiary care facility with 241 intensive care beds. Shands is a Level I trauma center and a leading organ-transplant center.

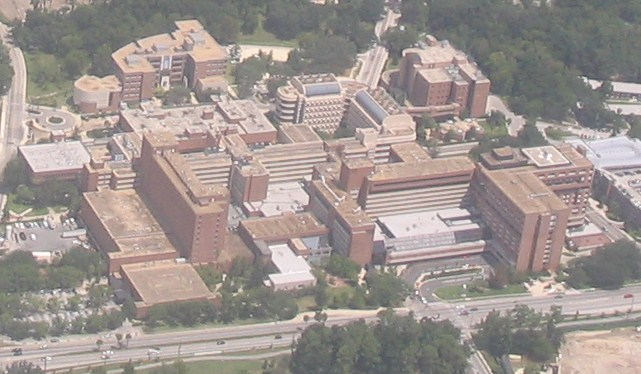
Health Science Center at the University of Florida

The J. Hillis Miller Health Science Center — named for the former University of Florida president—has expanded since 1956 into the most comprehensive academic health center in the Southeast. The "center" now encompasses six colleges and a statewide network of affiliated hospitals and clinics, including Shands Hospital at UF as the flagship teaching hospital and the neighboring Veterans Affairs Medical Center of Gainesville. The UF Health Science Center comprises the following Colleges: Dentistry, Health Professions, Medicine, Nursing, Pharmacy and Veterinary Medicine. The University of Florida is one of only a handful of universities to have all these health-related professional schools—including veterinary medicine—and to house most of them under one roof. Shands is as a structure connected to the Stetson Medical Sciences Building and the Academic Research Building—both research lab buildings—the Dental Tower, and buildings housing Nursing and Pharmacy. In addition, the Veterans Affairs Medical Center is connected via an underground passage to the ground floor of Shands. Other institutions include the McKnight Brain Institute at the University of Florida, one of the world's largest research institutions devoted to the challenges resulting from brain and nervous system disorders.

Announcing the opening of the new University of Florida Cancer Hospital, for Shands at the University of Florida, located on Archer Road adjacent to Shands Hospital in Gainesville, Florida. The facility was estimated to cost $388 million, and is 500,000 square feet (46,000 m^{2}). In 2017, Shands opened a new specialty hospital on the medical campus: the Heart & Vascular and Neuromedicine hospital. The joint construction of this facility cost roughly $450 million and includes operating rooms, cardiac catheterization labs, two intraoperative MRI suites, as well as inpatient heart and neuromedicine intensive care units and floor beds.

In 2020, the hospital was named as the second best hospital in Florida, and was ranked in 7 adult specialties and 5 pediatric specialties by the U.S. News & World Report.

== Specialty hospitals within Shands ==
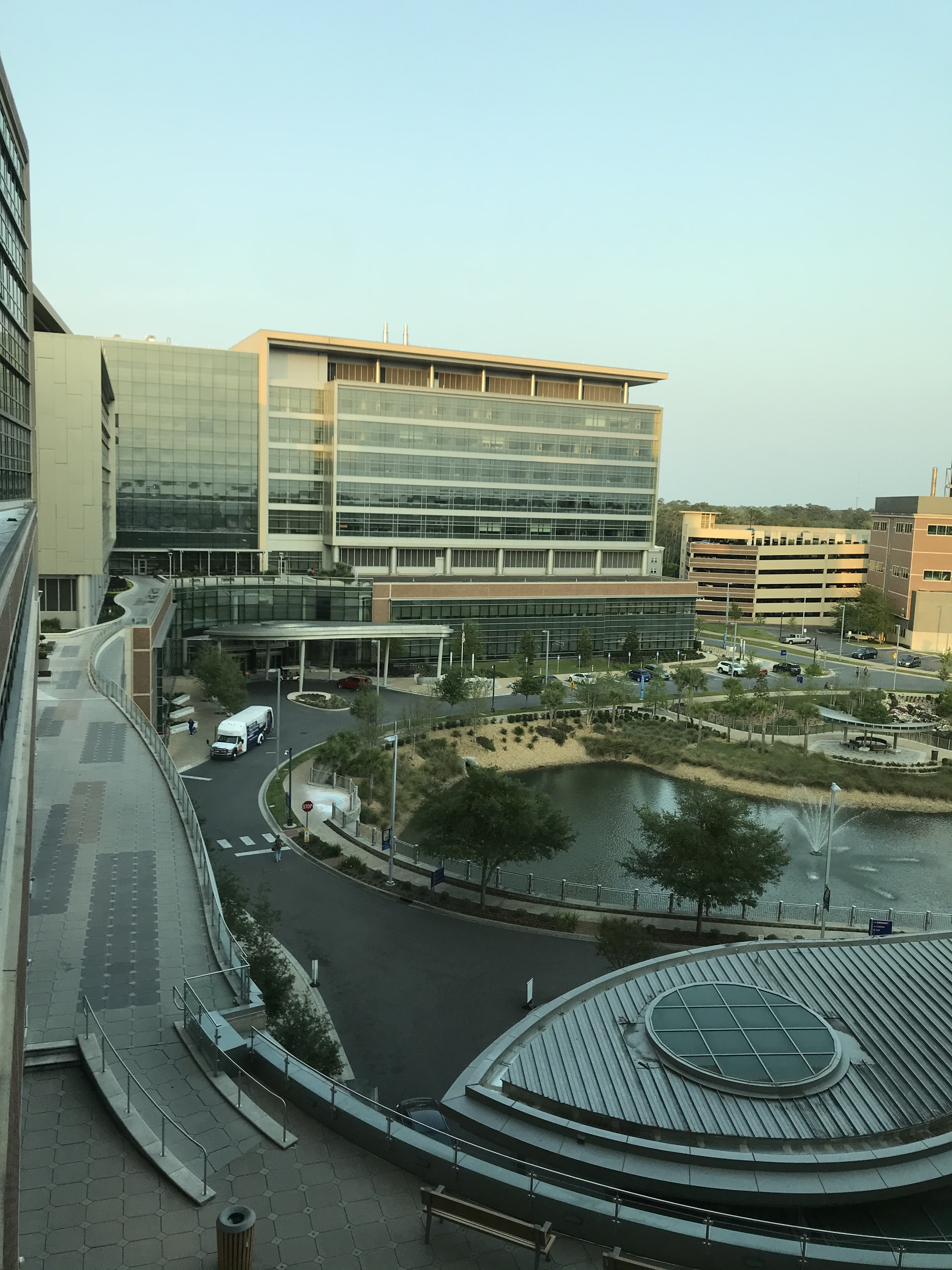
The Heart, Vascular and Neuromedicine Hospital as seen from the Cancer Hospital. The Garden of Hope can also be seen below.

=== UF Shands Children's Hospital ===
The UF Shands Children's Hospital is a pediatric acute care hospital. The hospital has 208 beds and is affiliated with the UF College of Medicine, and is a member of University of Florida Health Network. The hospital provides comprehensive pediatric specialties and subspecialties to pediatric patients aged 0–21 throughout Florida. It is also an ACS-verified Level I Pediatric Trauma Center.

=== UF Health Shands Cancer Hospital ===
UF Health Shands Cancer Hospital is an academic cancer center in Gainesville, Florida. The 200 bed complex focuses on producing basic laboratory findings that will ultimately be used for preventive therapies for cancers.

=== UF Health Heart & Vascular Hospital and UF Health Neuromedicine Hospital ===
Opened in 2017, these specialty hospitals feature a combined 216 beds (including 120 ICU beds) and 20 state-of-the-art operating rooms to provide comprehensive care for patients with heart and vascular and neurological needs. It offers seven dedicated neuromedicine operating rooms, including two with intraoperative MRI and two hybrid endovascular/cerebrovascular ORs with the latest imaging capabilities.

=== Other specialty hospitals ===
Shands also operates the following facilities that are not located at the main Shands campus:

- UF Health Shands Rehab Hospital housing 40 beds for patients recovering from strokes, traumatic injuries, and other conditions that interfere with activities of daily living. Not to be confused with the Florida Recovery Center, which provides substance abuse rehabilitation.
- UF Health Shands Psychiatric Hospital housing 81 beds, which includes its subsidiary, the UF Health Florida Recovery Center.
- UF Health Springhill Emergency Center
- UF Health Kanapaha Emergency Center

== See also ==
- University of Florida
- University of Florida College of Medicine
- J. Hillis Miller Health Science Center
- UF Health Jacksonville
- McKnight Brain Institute
- University of Florida Cancer Hospital
- Buildings at the University of Florida
- University of Florida Health
