= University of Florida College of Nursing =

Nursing school in Gainesville, Florida

College of Nursing
- Type: Nursing school
- Established: 1956
- Parent institution: Health Science Center
- Affiliations: University of Florida
- Dean: Dr. Shakira Henderson
- Academic staff: 70
- Students: 930
- Undergraduates: 700
- Postgraduates: 230
- Doctoral students: 48
- Location: Gainesville, Florida, United States
- Website: UF College of Nursing

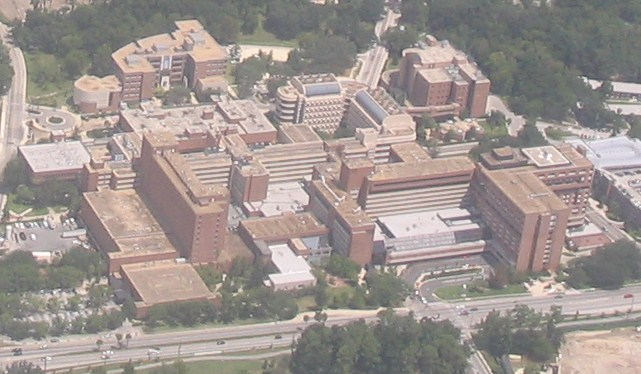
The college is part of the Health Science Center

The University of Florida College of Nursing is the nursing school of the University of Florida. The UF College of Nursing is Florida's Flagship nursing program. Established in 1956, the College of Nursing is located on the university's Gainesville, Florida main campus. The college is fully accredited, and is one of six academic colleges and schools that constitute the J. Hillis Miller Health Science Center.

The college is ranked among the top ten percent of all baccalaureate and graduate degree-granting nursing schools in the United States. The average overall grade point average (GPA) for incoming upperclassmen to the Bachelor of Science in Nursing (B.S.N.) program is 3.57. The college currently has 70 faculty members and 930 total students, including 230 graduate students, of which 48 are doctoral candidates.

80% of UF BSN graduates go on to graduate school within three years of graduation.

== Research ==
In total the College of Nursing received $5.1 million in total Research Revenues in 2024.

== Rankings ==
U.S. News & World Report ranks the college at 32nd overall among all U.S. nursing schools.

== See also ==
- University of Florida College of Dentistry
- University of Florida College of Public Health and Health Professions
- University of Florida College of Medicine
- University of Florida College of Pharmacy
- University of Florida College of Veterinary Medicine
