= University of Florida College of Pharmacy =

Pharmacy school in Gainesville, Florida

College of Pharmacy
- Type: Public pharmacy school
- Established: 1923
- Parent institution: University of Florida
- Dean: Peter Swaan
- Students: 1,245
- Location: Gainesville, Jacksonville, Orlando, Florida, United States
- Website: cop.ufl.edu

The University of Florida College of Pharmacy is the pharmacy school of the University of Florida located in Gainesville, Florida. Founded in 1923, The College of Pharmacy is one of six schools that compose the University of Florida Health Science Center. In addition, there are two campus sites in Jacksonville and Orlando. U.S. News & World Report ranks the college No. 4 nationally in its Best Pharmacy Colleges rankings.

== Degree Programs ==
The College of Pharmacy offers three degree programs: Doctor of Pharmacy (Pharm.D.) Doctor of Philosophy (Ph.D.) and Master of Science.

=== Doctor of Pharmacy ===
The college has 944 Pharm.D. students attending campuses in Gainesville, Orlando and Jacksonville. In 9 of the last 11 years, the UF College of Pharmacy ranked No. 1 nationally in the number of graduates securing highly competitive pharmacy residency positions. The professional program is accredited by the Accreditation Council for Pharmacy Education.

=== Master of Science ===
Since 2000, the college has developed a master's degree and certificate programs using distance learning technologies.

=== Doctor of Philosophy ===
The college's 143 Ph.D. students receive training under the mentorship of more than 70 graduate faculty.

== Campuses ==
The College of Pharmacy has three campuses — in Gainesville, Jacksonville and Orlando — where Pharm.D. students study the same curriculum through simultaneous learning. Classes on the three campuses connect synchronously through videoconferencing, with faculty present at each campus.

=== Gainesville ===
The University of Florida's Gainesville campus began offering pharmacy degrees in 1923. The pharmacy campus is part of UF Health, which is the country's only academic health center with six health-related colleges (Medicine, Nursing, Public Health and Health Professions, Dentistry, and Veterinary Medicine), nine research centers and institutes and 10 hospitals.

The Gainesville pharmacy campus has more than 500 Pharm.D. students enrolled with 130 new pharmacy students admitted each fall semester.

=== Jacksonville ===
The Jacksonville campus began offering Pharm.D. degrees in 2002.

The Jacksonville campus has approximately 200 Pharm.D. students enrolled with 40-50 new students admitted each fall semester to the Pharm.D. program.

=== Orlando ===
The Orlando campus began offering Pharm.D. degrees in 2002. It is located on the UF Research and Academic Center at Lake Nona campus. The campus has a total program enrollment of 280 students enrolled and admits approximately 70 new students each year in the fall semester.

== Rankings and reputation ==
In 2026, U.S. News & World Report ranks the College of Pharmacy at fourth overall. The American Association of Colleges of Pharmacy ranks UF No. 4 nationally in NIH funding and federal funding and No. 4 nationally in total research funding. In total the College of Pharmacy received $34.5 million in total Research Revenues in 2021.
