= McKnight Brain Institute =

Neuroscience research center at the University of Florida

Coordinates: 29.6419917°N 82.343769°W

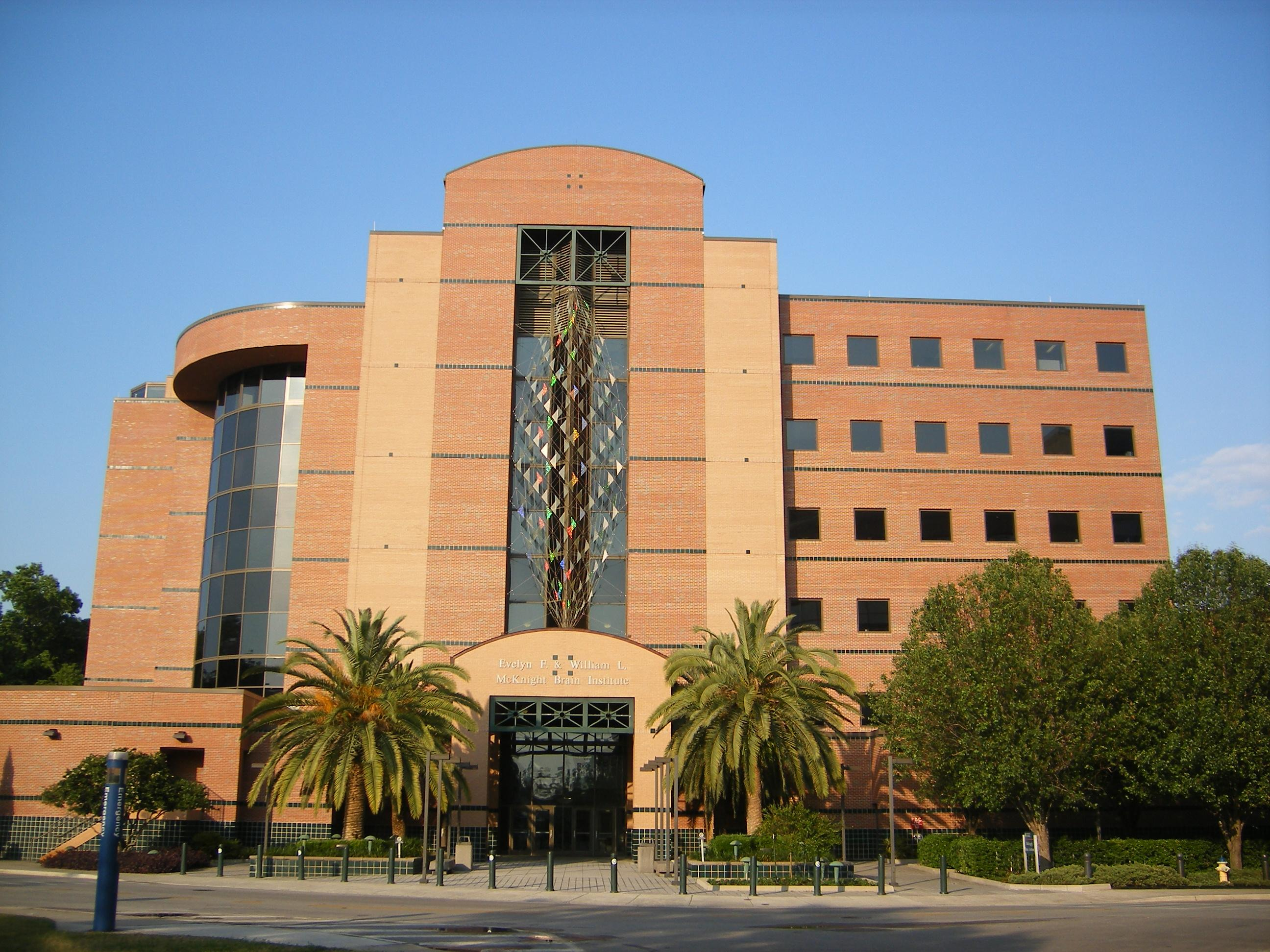
- Established: 1998
- Director: Jennifer L. Bizon, Ph.D.
- Location: Gainesville, Florida, USA
- Website: Official website

The Evelyn F. and William L. McKnight Brain Institute (MBI) at the University of Florida (UF) is a comprehensive and diverse neuroscience research center that houses the UF College of Medicine's four “neuro” departments: neuroscience, neurology, neurosurgery and psychiatry.

The MBI is one of the nation's most comprehensive and technologically advanced centers devoted to discovering how the normal brain operates, and how we can repair the brain following injury, disease or aging. The MBI connects and supports over 250 faculty from all 16 UF colleges with research focus areas that include brain cancer; breathing research and therapeutics; chronic neurological diseases (such as Parkinson's, dystonia, ALS and Alzheimer's); cognitive aging; mental health, neurobehavioral sciences and psychiatry; and traumatic brain injury and spinal cord injury.

The MBI was the first of the four McKnight Brain Institutes across the U.S., named in honor of a gift from the McKnight Brain Research Foundation. The other Institutes are at the University of Alabama at Birmingham, the University of Arizona and at the University of Miami.

Dr. Jennifer L. Bizon is the current executive director of the MBI. Former executive directors include founding director Dr. William Luttge, Dr. Douglas Anderson, Dr. Dennis A. Steindler, Dr. Tetsuo Ashizawa, and Dr. Todd E. Golde.

== History ==
Dr. William Luttge joined UF in 1971 as an assistant professor of neuroscience in the College of Medicine after earning his Ph.D. in biological sciences at the University of California, Irvine. The neuroscience department at the College of Medicine was one of the first of its kind in the country, and Luttge quickly became its leader, researching the molecular and behavioral actions of steroids in the brain.

In December 1991, Luttge came across an excerpt from an obscure newsletter, Commerce Business Daily, announcing a call for proposals for a competitive Department of Defense (DoD) grant to build a major national brain and spinal cord research center. Around the same time, UF — through its Health Science Center, College of Medicine and teaching hospital, Shands at UF — made a strategic decision to create a unique campus-wide program to enhance the multidisciplinary research, clinical care and educational skills of the entire university. This program was named the University of Florida Brain Institute (UFBI).

Newly appointed as director of the UFBI, Luttge embarked on a logistical tour de force to meet all requirements of the grant application. The requirements, such as a $36 million matching grant from UF, were soon met. And on June 11, 1992, UF had won the $18 million grant, beating out several prestigious universities and neuroscience research centers. Construction of the new institute building couldn't be completed, however, until the Defense Department and Veterans Affairs awarded another $20 million for the project in 1996 and 1997. On October 22, 1998, The University of Florida officially opened the doors to its world-class, UFBI building.

The UFBI was renamed the Evelyn F. & William L. McKnight Brain Institute of the University of Florida (MBI) to celebrate and commemorate a $15 million gift from the McKnight Brain Research Foundation. This award was at the time the largest cash gift in UF history and it was matched by the State of Florida to help create a $30 million permanent endowment devoted to fundamental research on the mechanisms underlying the formation, storage and retrieval of memories, the impairments in these processes associated with aging, and the development of therapeutic strategies for the prevention and/or alleviation of these impairments in humans.

== See also ==
- University of Florida
- Buildings at the University of Florida
