= University of Florida College of Medicine =

Medical school of the University of Florida

Coordinates: 29.6402°N 82.3435°W

College of Medicine
- Type: Public medical school
- Established: 1956
- Parent institution: University of Florida
- Dean: Dr. Brian Hoh
- Students: 1,642
- Location: Gainesville, Florida, United States
- Website: med.ufl.edu

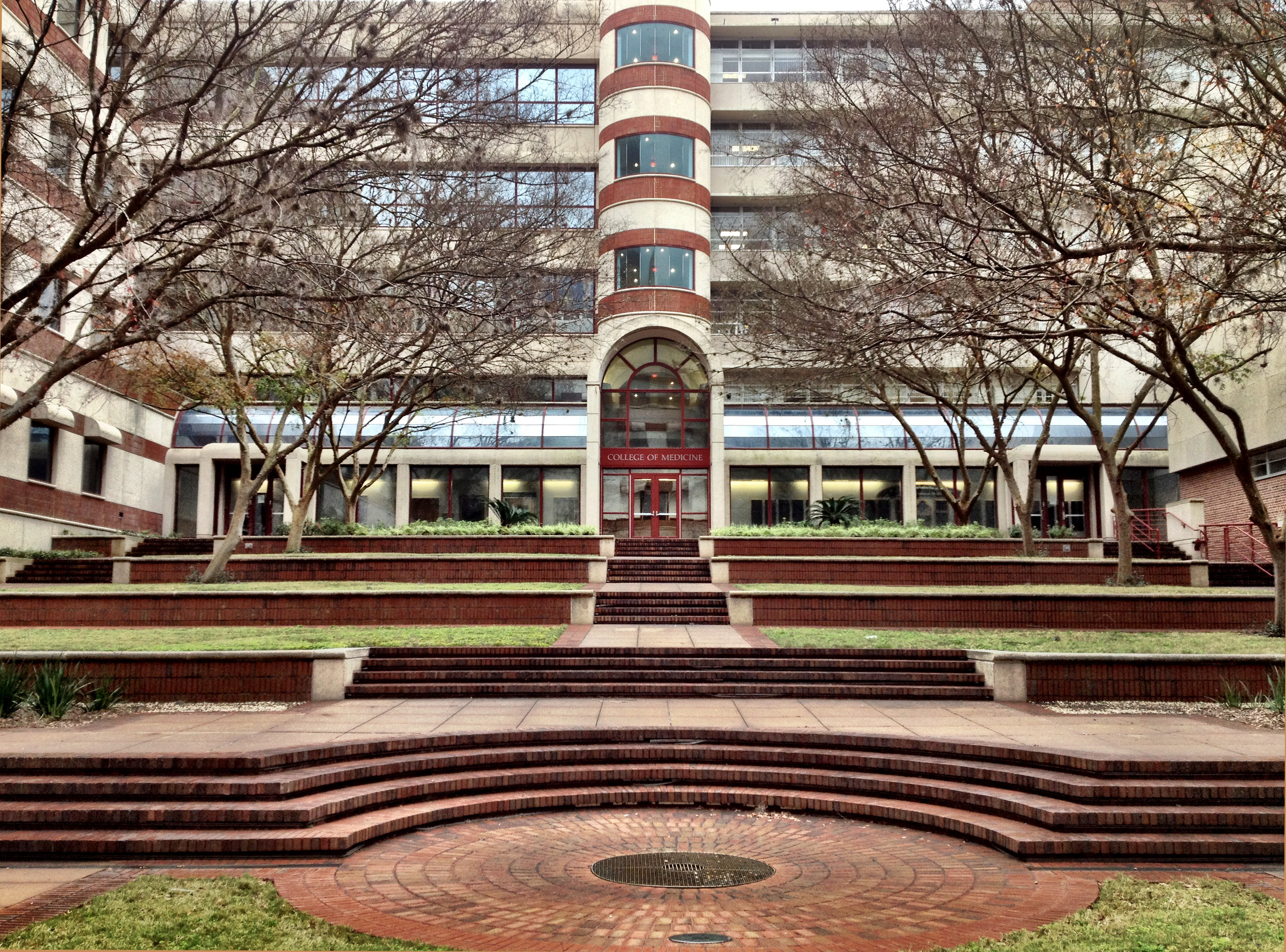
Entrance to the College of Medicine

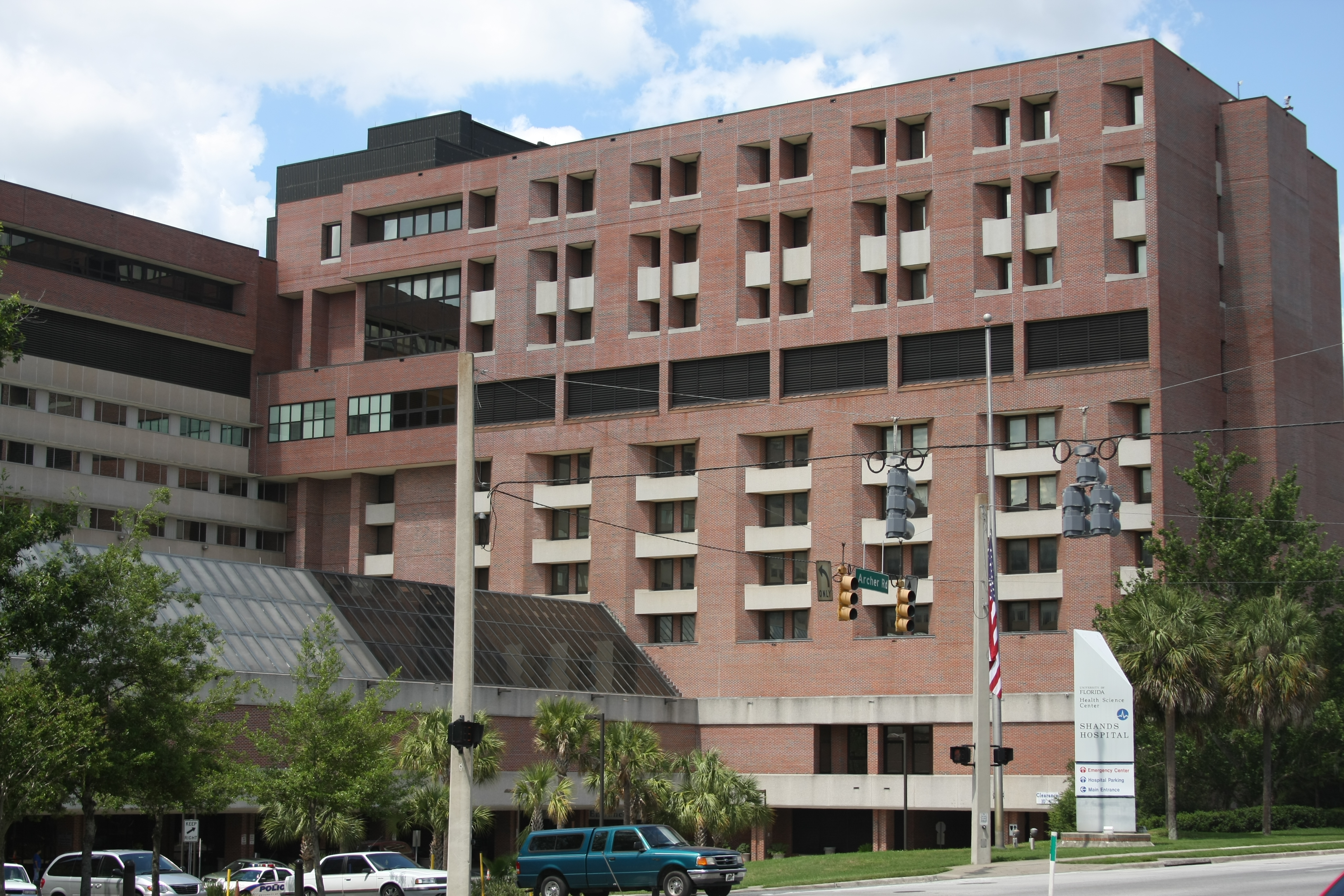
Teaching Hospital

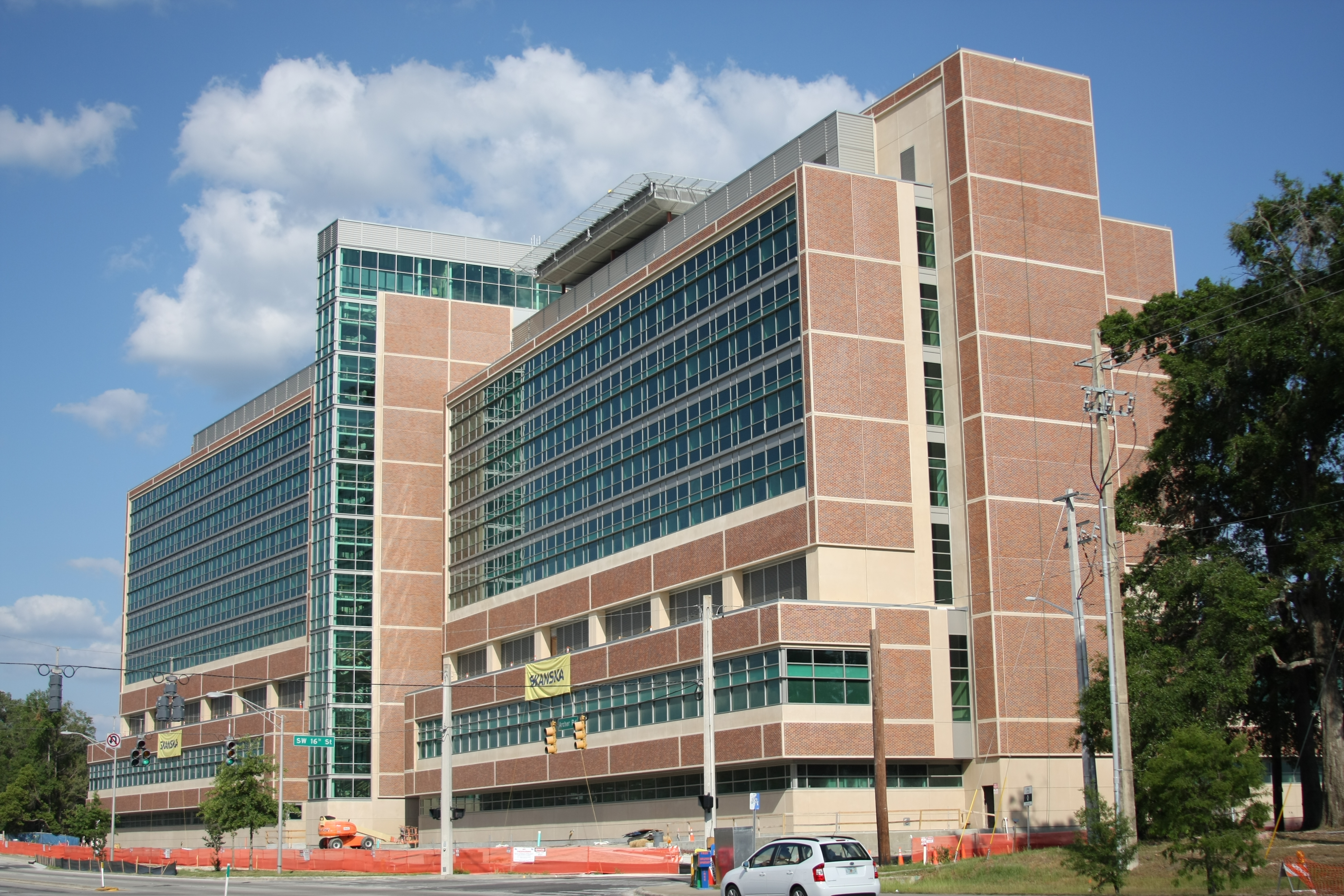
University of Florida Cancer Hospital

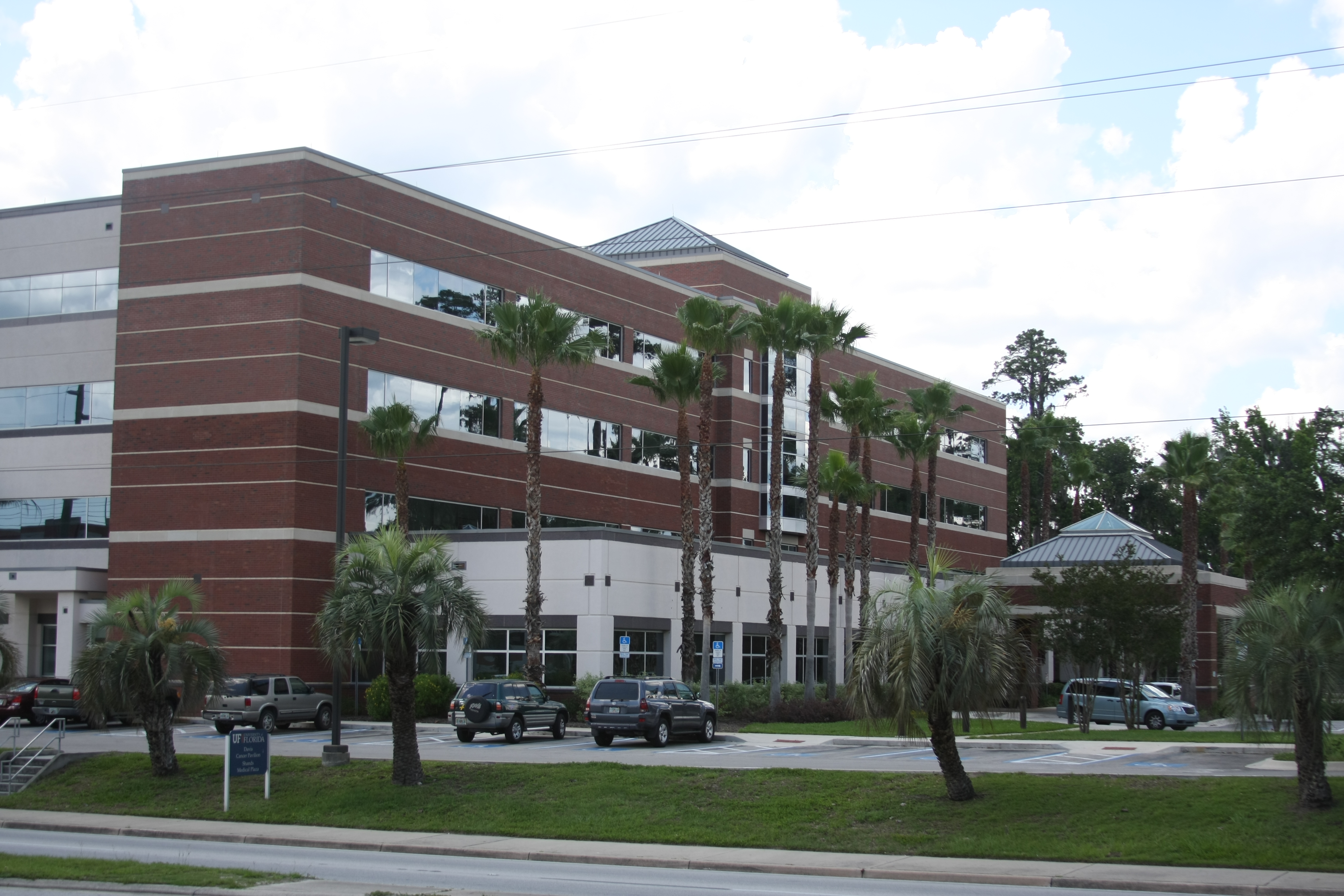
Medical Plaza

The University of Florida College of Medicine is the medical school of the University of Florida. It is part of the J. Hillis Miller Health Science Center, with facilities in Gainesville and Jacksonville, Florida. The school grants Doctor of Medicine (M.D.), Doctor of Medicine-Doctor of Philosophy (M.D.-Ph.D.), Doctor of Philosophy (Ph.D.), Master's (M.S.) and Physician Assistant (P.A.) degrees to its graduates. Its primary teaching hospital is UF Health Shands Hospital with which the school shares a campus in Gainesville.

== History ==
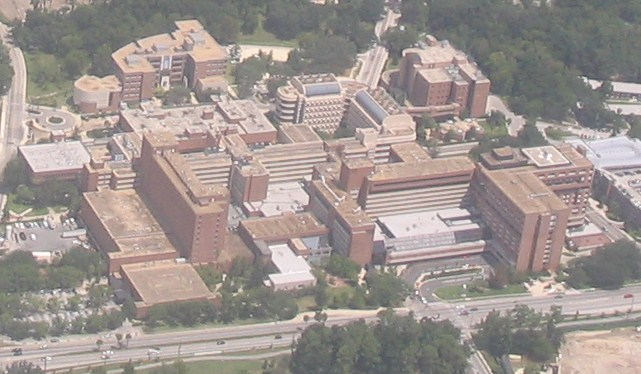
The college is part of the Health Science Center

The college was officially established in 1956. The founding Dean of the college was Dr. George T. Harrell. Dr. Harrell also founded the College of Medicine at Pennsylvania State University, becoming the first person to found two medical schools.

In March 2009, the college received the largest donation in its history. Jerry and Judy Davis donated $20 million to the College of Medicine to support teaching, research and programs in cancer, with special emphasis on research in lymphoma, breast cancer, bone marrow and gastrointestinal cancer.

The college has a long history of innovation. Highlights include:

- The invention of Gatorade
- Pioneering the use of the adeno-associated virus as a gene therapy vector
- Developing Stan the Human Patient Simulator, a lifelike patient mannequin that can replicate any type and severity of disease in patients
- Developing Trusopt, a breakthrough drug to treat glaucoma

As of July 2026, the college’s MD–PhD dual-degree program became part of the Medical Scientist Training Program (MSTP), highlighting its growing national recognition and commitment to excellence in physician-scientist training.

== Rankings ==
The university's teaching hospital, UF Health Shands Hospital, is nationally ranked in 7 adult specialties and 3 pediatric specialties.

In December 2018 Expertscape recognized it as #4 in the world for expertise in Diabetes Mellitus Type 1. In 2023, the college was recognized as the world’s top-ranked institution for published gene therapy research.

The University of Florida College of Medicine was awarded $372.6 million in annual research expenditures in sponsored research for 2024.

== Admissions ==
Admission to the University of Florida College of Medicine is considered to be highly competitive. For the M.D. class of 2015, 136 students enrolled out of 2,853 applicants. The class' undergraduate average GPA was 3.75, while the average MCAT was 31.06.

== Deans of the College of Medicine ==
Years	Dean
1953–1964	George T. Harrell
1964–1972	Emanuel Suter
1972–1977	Chandler Stetson
1978–1980	William Deal
1980–1989	J. Lee Dockery
1989–1996	Allen Neims
1997–2002	Kenneth Berns
2002–2007	C. Craig Tisher
2007–2008	Bruce C. Kone
2008–2018	Michael L. Good
2018–2021	J. Adrian Tyndall (interim Dean)
2021–2023	Colleen G. Koch
2024–2026	Jennifer Hunt (interim Dean)
2026-Present	Brian Hoh

== See also ==
- University of Florida
- J. Hillis Miller Health Science Center
- University of Florida College of Medicine-Jacksonville
- UF Health Shands Hospital
- UF Health Jacksonville
- McKnight Brain Institute
- UF Health Shands Cancer Hospital
