= Publication of Archival, Library & Museum Materials =

Publication of Archival, Library & Museum Materials (PALMM) is a cooperative initiative of the public universities of Florida in the United States to provide a central repository for smaller digital collections. In addition to contributing to PALMM, universities in Florida also host and maintain separate individual digital collections as well as many large collaborative projects. In September 2011, Florida's Council of State University Libraries selected SobekCM to power a common digital library system across the state, replacing the software currently powering the PALMM collections.

Other large, collaborate digital libraries supported by public universities in Florida include:

- Florida International University, which hosts and supports the Everglades Digital Library
- Digital Library of the Caribbean, with many contributing partners in Florida and the Caribbean
- University of South Florida, which hosts and supports the Florida Oral History Digital Collections
- University of Central Florida, which hosts and supports Central Florida Memory
- University of Florida, which hosts and supports Florida Digital Newspaper Library
- University of Florida, which hosts and supports the University of Florida Digital Collections

== Collections ==
=== Archives Florida ===
Archives Florida is a database of guides and inventories (finding aids) for Florida archive collections. Finding aids can be contributed by Florida libraries, museums, historical societies, and other groups. The database is constantly updated, and users can browse or search collectively or by individual archives. Contributing libraries and museums include Broward County Library, Florida Atlantic University Libraries, Florida International University Libraries, Florida State University, Rollins College, and Winter Park Public Library.

=== Aerial Photography Florida ===
With approximately 160,000 photos, the Aerial Photography: Florida Collection is the largest and most complete collection of Florida aerial photographs outside of the National Archives. The photographs center on the changes in Florida's land use spanning the years of 1937 to 1990. This online collection was funded by three Library Services and Technology Act grants. Users can search using map search, flights by county, and ArcGIS search. Additionally, images can be downloaded as JPEG 2000 files.

Aerial photography has been used as an educational resource, enabling farmers to better utilize their land and informing city planners in their decision-making process.

=== Big Cypress National Preserve Collection ===
Documenting the natural heritage of the Big Cypress National Preserve, the Big Cypress National Preserve Collection serves as a digital photo-album showing the flora and fauna of this preserve in southwestern Florida. The collection was produced by the Preserve's staff alongside the Southwest Florida Library Network (SWFLN) in a project funded by the State of Florida's Library Services and Technology Act (LSTA) grants program.

=== Coral Gables Memory ===
Donated to the city of Coral Gables by Kerdyk Realty, Coral Gables Memory is an album that contains photographs of homes and business structures. Coral Gables is a planned community that took much inspiration from the Garden City and City Beautiful movements of the late 19th and early 20th centuries.

Most of the photographs in Coral Gables Memory collection were captured in the 1940s. Users will find visual and textual materials that document the history, culture, architecture, and people of Coral Gables. Additionally, minute books, published works, postcards, among other materials, can be viewed in this collection.

=== Everglades Digital Library ===
Established in 1996, the Everglades Digital Library (EDL) features online texts, articles, reports, photographs, maps, data sets, educational materials, and historical records all pertaining to the South Florida environment. The primary goal of this collection is to support research, education, decision making, and information resource management within the greater Everglades community. The materials within this collection originate from such sources as libraries, government agencies, non-profit organizations, and educational institutions. The EDL is a service of the Digital Collections Center at Florida International University Libraries.

In terms of technology, the EDL runs on the Collection Workflow Integration System (CWIS), which was specifically created to help build collections in Science, Technology, Engineering, and Math for the National Science Digital Library. Because of this system, the EDL enjoys many features, including Amazon resource annotations and ratings, keyword searching, RSS feed support, an integrated metadata editing tool, prepackaged taxonomies, user-definable schema, and even user interface themes.

=== Florida Heritage Collection ===
Established in 1998 by the libraries of the State University System of Florida (SUS) in partnership with the Florida Center for Library Automation (FCLA) and the State Library of Florida, the Florida Heritage Collection is the first statewide digital library initiative in Florida. This collection is notable in that it provides online access to materials broadly representing Florida's history, culture, arts, literature, sciences and social sciences. Some of the major focuses of the Florida Heritage Collection are Native American and minority populations, exploration and development, tourism, the natural environment, and regional interests. Florida's ten state universities contribute materials from their archives, special collections, and libraries to this collection.

Users viewing this collection will find a variety of local and regional materials about Florida's history and cultural, including local history books and booklets, advertising materials from the Florida Boom, Civil War letters, and other materials that provide knowledge of Florida's history. Due to the largely emigrant nature of Florida's history, the collection stresses the importance of featuring family papers and records, diaries, letters, business records, maps, photographs, and other materials that are unique and important for historical research.

In terms of workflow, the contributing university libraries and archives contribute catalog records for the digitized version to a central database. For each submission, libraries indicate the grade level of the material in accordance with Florida's Sunshine State Standards.

=== Miami Metropolitan Archive ===
Developed in 2001, the Miami Metropolitan Archive is focused on preserving and sharing early Miami materials. The themes of this collection are local history, community development, urban planning and design, resource and environmental management, area studies, architecture, transportation, education, Black Miami, and multicultural issues. Miami Metropolitan Archive's goal is to provide digital access to important source materials on Miami-Dade County urban development. The Miami Metropolitan Archive is operated by the Urban, Regional & Local Government Documents Department at Florida International University Libraries and Miami City Clerk's Office.

For the years of 1896 to 1966, users will find government documents, including Miami City Council meeting minutes, charters, departmental annual reports, and planning documents.

=== Florida Historical Quarterly ===
An online version of the academic journal by the same title, the goal of the Florida Historical Quarterly is to expand users' understanding of Florida's historical development. This collection emphasizes scholarly research and appreciation for the peoples, places, themes, and diversity of Florida's past.

Although the Florida Historical Quarterly was originally a part of the Florida Heritage Collection, in 2005 the Digital Projects Planning Committee decided to separate it into its own individual collection because of its high volume of use and the need for direct access.

=== Koreshan State Historic Site Collection ===
The Koreshan State Historic Site Collection focuses on the Koreshan State Historic Site, one of Florida's state parks and a cultural heritage site. This collection serves as a digital photo-album of the site. The photographs within this collection were contributed by the Estero Historical Society and the Florida Division of Recreation and Parks - Koreshan State Historic Site.

The collection is funded by the Library Services and Technology Act Grants (LSTA).
