= NewspaperCat =

Online reference of digitized newspapers

Catalog of Digital Historical Newspapers
- Company type: Subsidiary
- Industry: Publishing
- Founded: 2009
- Headquarters: Gainesville, Florida, United States
- Parent: George A. Smathers Libraries
- Website: ufdc.ufl.edu/hnccoll

The Catalog of Digital Historical Newspapers (NewspaperCat) is a free online resource for open-access digitized historical newspapers published in North America and the Caribbean. NewspaperCat was developed from a grant by the George A. Smathers Libraries at the University of Florida and is powered by SobekCM, the content management system used by the University of Florida Digital Collections.

In 2012, NewspaperCat was listed as one of 26 "outstanding reference sites" in the Best Free Reference Web Sites of 2012 by the MARS: Emerging Technologies in Reference section of the Reference and User Services Association (RUSA), which is a division of the American Library Association (ALA).

== History ==
NewspaperCat began in November 2009 to address the need for a cohesive online resource of digital newspaper facsimiles for academic researchers at the University of Florida. The project was supported and well-received by faculty and staff of the libraries and academic departments of the University of Florida. In general, the aim of the project was to provide an example of a digital metasearch platform that librarians and information professionals could use to become more involved in collating accessible digital content that was specific to the needs of their respective patrons.

In October 2010, the project grew to facilitate online access to over 700 newspaper titles from the southern United States, using RefWorks reference management software to organize and build an initial database of MARC standards records. By the end of 2010, the NewspaperCat database had migrated to a content management software (SobekCM) that supported its launch as a "discovery tool" or "portal, allowing all of the newspaper records to be fully and freely searched and browsed within the system".
