= University of Florida Latin American Collection =

Coordinates: 29.650614°N 82.341520°W

- Company type: Subsidiary
- Industry: Library
- Founded: 1951
- Headquarters: Smathers Library Gainesville, Florida, United States
- Parent: George A. Smathers Libraries
- Website: cms.uflib.ufl.edu/lac/Index.aspxl

The University of Florida Latin American & Caribbean Collections is a library within the George A. Smathers Libraries is "one of the leading research collections of its kind". Founded in 1951 to support scholarly interest in Latin America and the Caribbean, now the Latin American and Caribbean Collections are one of the University of Florida’s preeminent collections, holding approximately 500,000 volumes, over 50,000 microforms, thousands of current and historical serial titles, and a large number of digital resources. The Collections were also part of the Farmington Plan.

== See also ==
- University of Florida Center for Latin American Studies
- Digital Library of the Caribbean
