= Government Documents Department (University of Florida) =

Government documents program at University of Florida

University of Florida Government Documents Program
- Company type: Subsidiary
- Industry: Publisher
- Founded: 1907
- Headquarters: Gainesville, Florida, United States
- Key people: Sarah Erekson
- Parent: George A. Smathers Libraries
- Website: guides.uflib.ufl.edu/ufdocuments

The Government Documents Program is a part of the George A. Smathers Libraries at the University of Florida. The Libraries receives government publications from all levels of government (local, county, state, and national), and from many areas around the world. The staff performs both technical and public service functions in an effort to make this resource of government information available to both the University of Florida community and the public at large; staff also have prepared LibGuides (research and information guides) on various topics to assist patrons.

The George A. Smathers Libraries are the Regional Federal Depository for Florida, Puerto Rico and the U.S. Virgin Islands. The Government Documents Department also serves as a regional depository for U.S. Federal documents. As such, the Department receives and permanently retains one depository copy of every publication the U.S. Government Publishing Office distributes through the Federal Depository Library Program The Government Documents Department is also a depository for the Government of Florida and European Union documents. The Government Documents Library also houses publications from the University of Florida, international governmental organizations (such as the United Nations, the Organisation for Economic Co-operation and Development and UNESCO.

== History ==
The University of Florida was declared a Federal Depository Library in 1907, and became a Regional Depository Library in 1962. Until 2004, the collection was housed in Library West at the University of Florida; before moving to the first floor of the University of Florida Marston Science Library for several years. The collection is now located at the Auxiliary Library Facility.

== Consortial efforts ==
As a member of the Association of South East Research Libraries (ASERL), the University of Florida George A. Smathers Libraries are participating in the Collaborative Federal Depository Program, a shared print program that encourages member Regional Depository Libraries to become Centers of Excellence for specific government agencies. The Centers of Excellence accept a role as stewards of these collections, agreeing to collect, catalog, and preserve publications produced by a given agency or published by the government around a certain them. The UF Libraries have committed to becoming a Center of Excellence for the Panama Canal Commission (PCC) and its preceding institutions as well as on the topic of the Panama Canal. As an additional step in this project, the UF Libraries have decided to digitize the material in this collection. As they are scanned, titles become available at Internet Archive and are then also made available the UF libraries catalog. [Note: The phrase center of excellence is used here as it is used within the U.S. Federal Depository Library Program to identify a library establishing a collection and related services focused on a specific Federal agency or subject area represented by Federal documents. This is distinct from, and unrelated to, the Florida program of the same name that is intended to bridge the gap between academia and industry.]
