= Association of Caribbean University, Research and Institutional Libraries =

Organization based in the University of Puerto Rico

The Association of Caribbean University, Research and Institutional Libraries (ACURIL) is a Caribbean library organization founded in 1969. It is based in the José M. Lázaro Library of the University of Puerto Rico.

== About ACURIL ==
The Association of Caribbean University, Research and Institutional Libraries (ACURIL) was first created in 1969 at a conference sponsored by the Association of Caribbean Universities and the Institute of Caribbean Studies at University of Puerto Rico. The first leaders of the organization were: President Dr. Alma Theodora Jordan, Vice President Dr. Albertina Perez de Rosa, and Secretary/Treasurer Dr. Luisa Vigo-Cepeda.

ACURIL supports collaboration between university and research libraries. It believes in embracing different libraries which encompass research, including public libraries and special libraries. ACURIL has been essential to professional inspiration for many librarians in the Caribbean region, providing them with continuing educational opportunities and creating a conducive environment for collaboration with other professionals. Growth of regional bodies of international associations such as ACURIL has been attributed to greater international awareness after the Second World War and to the regular and affordable air transportation. Its name was changed to the Association of Caribbean University, Research and Institutional Libraries in 1976.

=== Goals ===
The mission of ACURIL is to "facilitate development and use of libraries, archives, and information services and the identification, collection and preservation of information resources in support of the whole range of intellectual and educational endeavors throughout the Caribbean area". Furthermore, the ACUIRL is determined to establish a distinct and effective organization of qualified individuals in the fields of archival and library science as well as to sustain an enduring presence within the Caribbean region with a unification of information professionals.

ACURIL's achievements include grouping together regional projects that work towards improving the retrieval of information that is created in the region.

=== Membership ===
Any type of library, archive, organization or individual in a country that borders the Gulf of Mexico and the Caribbean is eligible for membership in the ACURIL organization. There are four types of membership: institutional, organizational, personal and associate. Institutional membership includes libraries, archives and schools of library and information. Organizational membership includes national, regional and other special library organizations and associations. Personal membership is for practicing information professionals, students who are enrolled in information courses of study, non salaried librarians including retired and unemployed, and honorary members. Any individuals or organizations outside of the Caribbean and borders of the Gulf of Mexico are eligible for an associate membership. The main official languages of ACURIL members include English, Spanish, Dutch, and French and encompass 26 nations.

== Conferences ==
- ACURIL 2023 - Jamaica
- ACURIL 2022 - Curaçao
- ACURIL 2021 - No conference
- ACURIL 2020 - Bahamas (virtual)
- ACURIL 2019 - Aruba
- ACURIL 2018 - Dominican Republic
- ACURIL 2017 - Puerto Rico
- ACURIL 2016 - Haiti
- ACURIL 2015 — Suriname
- ACURIL 2014 — Bahamas
- ACURIL 2013 — Puerto Rico
- ACURIL 2012 — Haiti
- ACURIL 2011 — Tampa, Florida
- ACURIL 2010 — Santo Domingo, Dominican Republic
- ACURIL 2009 — Guadeloupe
- ACURIL 2008 — Montego Bay, Jamaica
- ACURIL 2007 — San Juan, Puerto Rico
- ACURIL 2004 -- Port-of-Spain, Trinidad and Tobago
- ACURIL 1997 — Santo Domingo, Dominican Republic
- ACURIL 1992 — Port-of-Spain, Trinidad and Tobago
- ACURIL, 1987 — Miami, Florida, U.S.

== Awards ==
Since 2000, ACURIL has given awards to three areas: Institutions, Information professionals, and the Caribbean information professional of the year.
Each area encompasses several awards, which are given annually at ACURIL conferences.

=== Institutional awards ===
ACURIL President's Award

- Recognizes and distinguishes a school, public or national library in the Caribbean, which has demonstrated excellence of service providing a program to satisfy special community information needs. Established in 2000 by former Jamaican president Stephney Ferguson.
- 2014 winner: Elizabeth Estates Public Library, Nassau, Bahamas

OCLC Recognition for Promoting the OCLC Cooperative in the Caribbean

- The OCLC Recognition award — recognizes institutions with librarians from the Caribbean library community for their commitment within the library cooperative and for their involvement in promoting cooperation in the region.
- 2014 winners:

- The Alma Jordan Library at The University of the West Indies, St. Augustine Campus, Trinidad & Tobago.
- The Sidney Martin Library, at The University of the West Indies, Cave Hill Campus, Barbados

Leadership in the Use of New Information Technologies to Expand and Facilitate Access to Electronic Content

- EBSCO Information Services Award — recognizes and distinguishes a school, academic, public or national library for its innovative, creative and effective achievement in planning and implementing a program or service with electronic publications, using information technologies, for the benefit of its clientele.
- 2014 winners:

- The College of The Bahamas Libraries and Instructional Media Services (LIMS)
- Dr. Arturo Carrión Pacheco Library at the Learning and Information Resources Center, Universidad Central del Caribe (UCC), Puerto Rico

Innovative and Effective Information Services with the Application of Information Technologies

- Systems Link International Award — recognizes and distinguishes a school, academic, public or national library for its innovative, creative and effective achievement in planning and implementing a program or service, for the benefit of its clientele, using information technologies.
- 2014 winner: Calvin McKain Library, University of Technology, Jamaica

Leadership in the Organization and Retrieval of Information with an Automation Program

- Mandarin Library Automation Award — recognizes and distinguishes a school, academic, public or national library for its innovative, creative and effective achievement in the planning and development of the organization and retrieval of information, for the benefit of its clientele.
- 2014 winner: The Belize National Library Service and Information System (BNLSIS), Belize

Leadership in the Development of Research Solutions that Connect People

- ProQuest Award — recognizes and distinguishes a school, academic, public or national library for its innovative, creative and effective achievement in planning and implementing a program or service, for the benefit of its clientele, using information technologies.
- 2014 winners:

- Sistema de Bibliotecas of the Pontificia Universidad Católica Madre y Maestra (PUCMM)
- Colleges Libraries Information Network of Jamaica (COLINET)

The Albertina Pérez de Rosa Information Units Alliances and Collaborative Projects in the Caribbean

- ACURIL, Puerto Rico Chapter Award — recognizes and honors the excellent performance of alliance and collaborative efforts of local or regional information units and communities of practice, or by private enterprises, evidenced through the implementation of successful information projects for the benefit of their clienteles in the Caribbean.
- 2013 winner: National Library of Aruba
- 2014 winner: The Digital Library of the Caribbean (dLOC)

=== Information professionals awards ===
Excellence in Information Literacy

- University of Puerto Rico, Graduate School of Information Sciences and Technologies Award, recognizes and honors innovative approaches of programs and services or outstanding publication related to information literacy by a colleague in a library, archive, document center environment, in the last two years, evidenced by the significant learning perceived by and satisfaction deriv97hed from its clienteles.
- 2014 winners:

- Penelope Nottage, Bahamas Library Service
- Elsie Bain, College of The Bahamas Library

Excellence in Research and Publications

- ACURIL Research Interest Group Award, recognizes and honors the individual commitment, excellence in performance, and outstanding achievement of an information professional (librarian, archivist, documentalist, etc.), member of ACURIL.
- 2014 winners:

- Carmen Margarita Santos-Corrada, Special Libraries Collection, Conrado J. Asenjo Library, University of Puerto Rico
- Lorraine Nero, Special Collections Librarian, at The Alma Jordan Library, University of the West Indies, Saint Augustine, Trinidad and Tobago
- Frank Soodeen, Head, Information Technology Services Section, at The Alma Jordan Library, University of the West Indies, St. Augustine, Trinidad and Tobago
- 2007 winner
- Shamin Renwick, Head, Multimedia and Information Technology Unit, Medical Sciences Library, University of the West Indies, St. Augustine, Trinidad and Tobago

=== Information Professional of the Year ===
The Information Professional of the Year award honors the individual commitment, excellence in performance, and outstanding professional achievement of an information specialist (librarian, archivists, documentalists, etc.) in the Caribbean, members of ACURIL (in any of the linguistic areas: English, French or Dutch and Spanish).

- 2024 winner: Dr. Peter Scholing, Researcher/Information Scientist, Biblioteca Nacional Aruba | Digital Collections Curator, Coleccion Aruba
- 2023 winner: Dr. Jeannette Lebrón Ramos, Reference Librarian coordinator, University of Puerto Rico, Río Piedras Campus
- 2023 winner: Erick Toussaint, FOKAL
- 2022 winner: Loida Garcia Febo, International Library Consultant expert in library services to diverse populations and human rights
- 2019 winner: Cheryl Peltier-Davis, University of the West Indies, St. Augustine, Trinidad and Tobago
- 2018 winner: Dr. Laurie N. Taylor, University of Florida and Digital Library of the Caribbean
- 2017 winner: Dr. Marisol Florén-Romero, Florida International University
- 2016 winner: Monique Alberts, St. Maarten's Philipsburgh Jubilee Library,
- 2015 winner: Dulce María Núñez de Taveras, Library System's Director of the Pontificia Universidad Católica Madre y Maestra, of the Dominican Republic
- 2014 winner: Judith V. Rogers, Director of Libraries, University of the Virgin Islands, St. Croix, St. John, and St. Thomas
- 2013 winner: Dr. Ardis Hanson, assistant director for Reference and Education, University of South Florida's Shimberg Health Sciences Library
- 2011 winner: Beverley Lashley, Head, UWI, Mona Science Branch Library and Coordinator of the Caribbean Disaster Information Network (CARDIN)
- 2008 winner: Professor Margaret Rouse-Jones, Campus and University Librarian of The University of the West Indies (UWI)

== Contact information ==
The General Headquarters of the Association is in San Juan, Puerto Rico, and physically located at the Caribbean Regional Library and Latin American Studies, within the José M. Lázaro Library of the University of Puerto Rico, Río Piedras Campus. Its mailing address is P.O. Box 23317, UPR Station, San Juan, PR 00931–3317. Tel (787)790-8054; Fax (787)790-8054

== See also ==
- Caribbean studies
- The Digital Library of the Caribbean
