= University of Florida Library West =

Library West
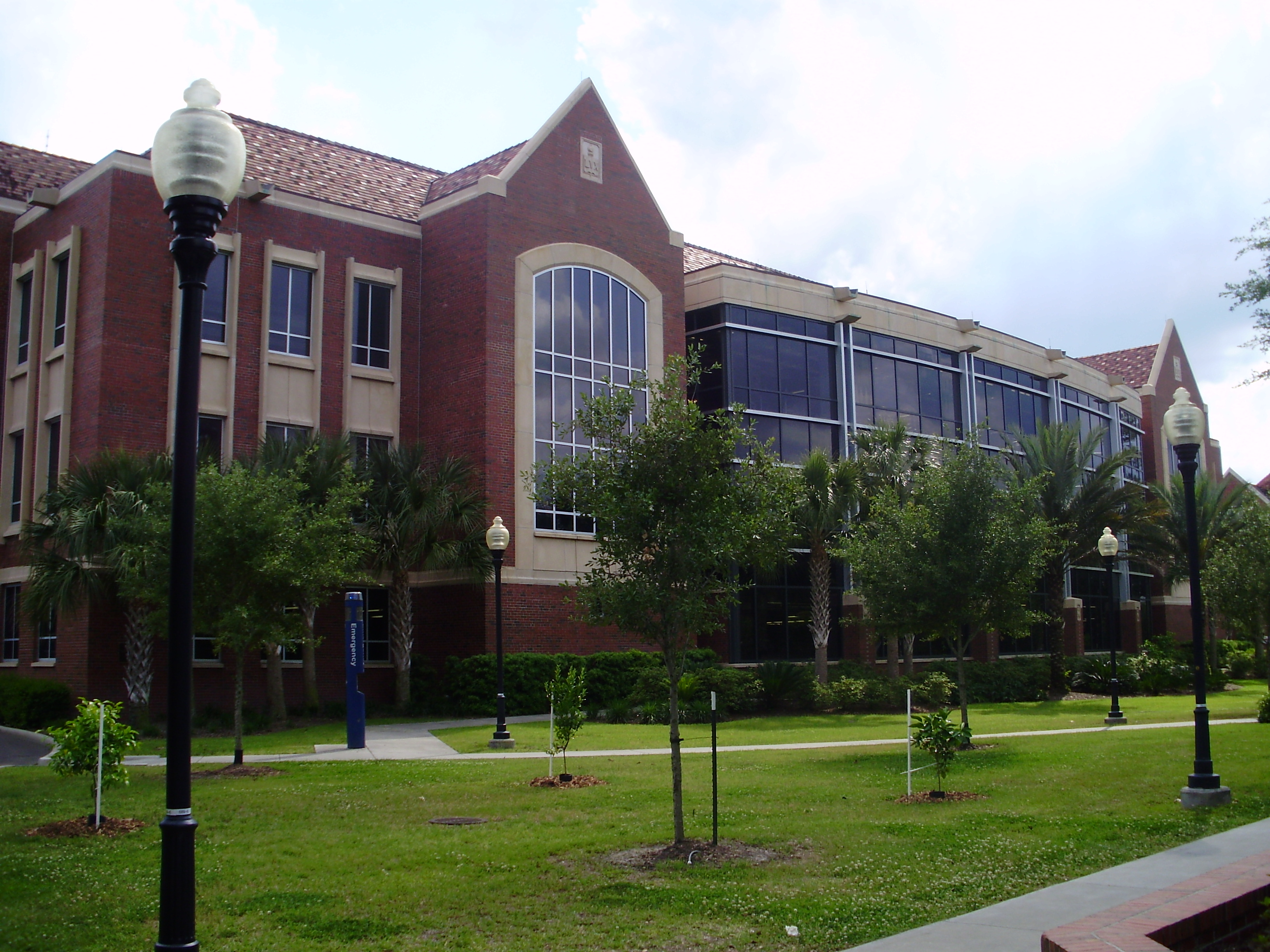
- The Humanities and Social Sciences Library at the University of Florida
- Interactive map of the Library West area

General information
- Type: Academic library
- Location: 1545 W. University Ave., Gainesville, Florida 32611
- Coordinates: 29°39′4.946″N 82°20′34.324″W
- Opened: 1967
- Renovated: 2003-2006

Website
- http://cms.uflib.ufl.edu/librarywest/

Library West is the major library of the University of Florida's George A. Smathers Libraries system. Its collections consist of material on the humanities and social sciences, as well as African studies and Asian studies resources. The Isser and Rae Price Library of Judaica special collection on Jewish studies is also part of the collection. Librarians specializing in these fields are available to help students and faculty with their research.

Library West primarily serves the College of Liberal Arts and Sciences, College of Journalism and Communications, and the Warrington College of Business Administration. It is the largest of the seven Smathers Libraries at UF. The other major library is the Marston Science Library, which holds collections on agriculture, engineering, mathematics, and the natural and physical sciences.

The library is located at the north end of the Plaza of the Americas, at the Campus Historic District in the northeastern part of campus. The library is colloquially referred to as "Lib West" or "Club West" by some students.

== History ==
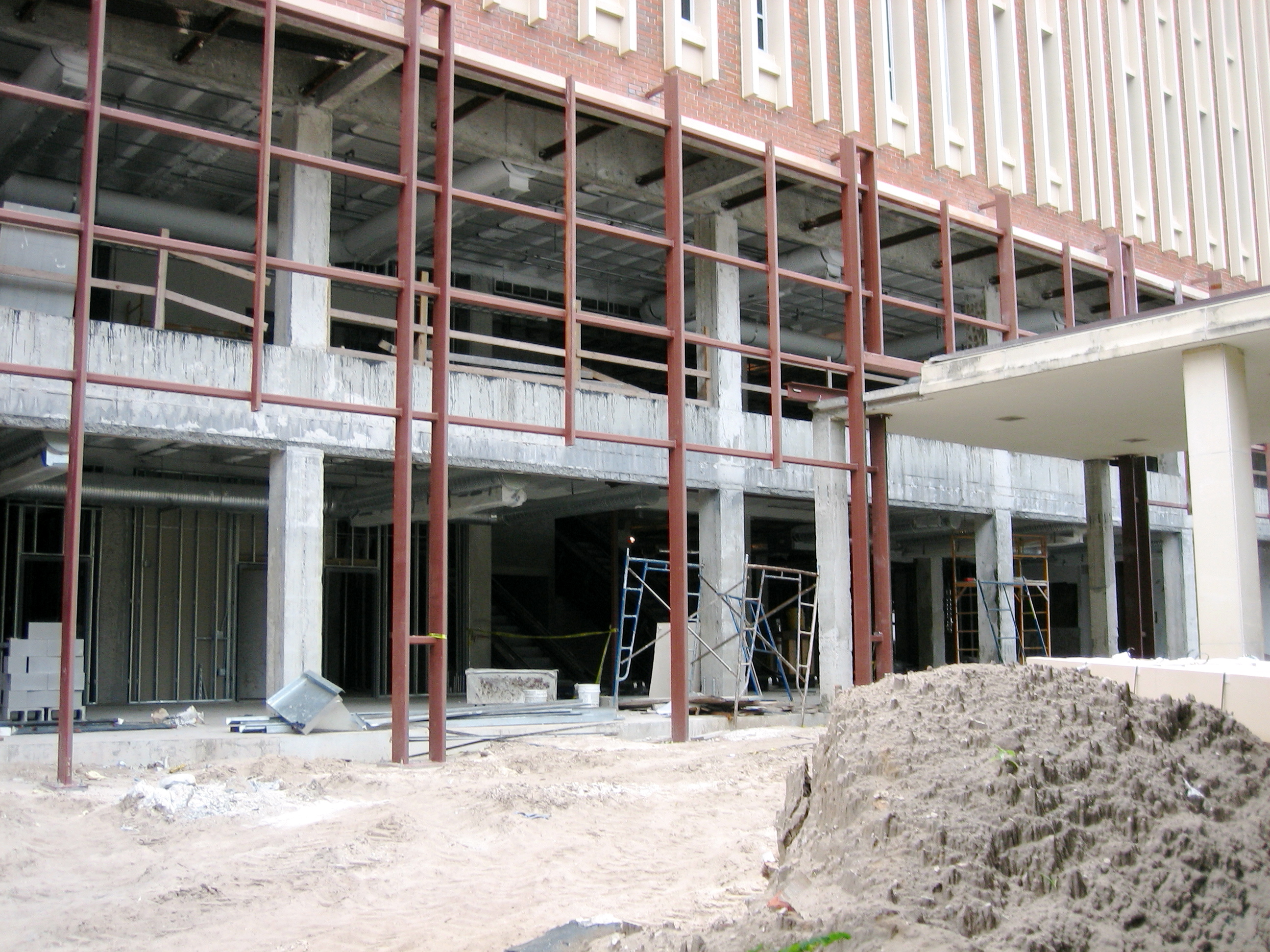
Renovation of Library West

Library West was first constructed in 1967 and was originally designated as the "Graduate Research Library." Library East (now Smathers Library) was at the same time designated as the undergraduate library. However, in the following decades the two buildings' collections were integrated together and Library West became established as the social sciences and humanities library on campus.

Prompted by a need for more space for materials, Library West was closed for a $30 million renovation in December 2003 that doubled its capacity, improved its information technology capabilities, and added a Starbucks to the lobby. The library reopened in August 2006, and the renovations earned the library gold LEED certification, making Library West the second UF building to obtain that status (the first was Rinker Hall, which houses the Rinker School of Building Construction).

== Services ==
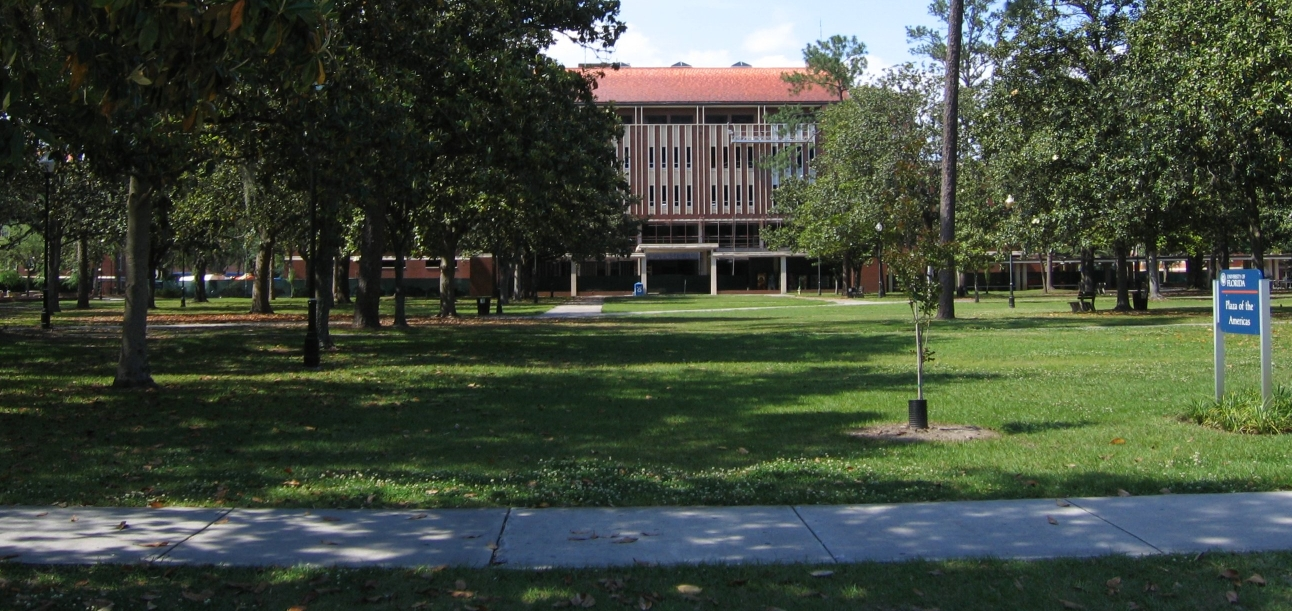
View of Library West from the south

The library can seat up to 1,400 patrons. It is equipped with eighteen group study rooms, available for checkout from the circulation desk, as well as eight study booths with computers and four booths equipped for viewing videos. Thirty iPad 3 devices are available for checkout at the circulation desk. Four digital microfilm readers are also available for public use, in addition to a significant number of computers and printers. There are numerous carrels and study facilities located on the top floors for graduate students, and the top two floors of the library are designated for quiet study only. The library has fluctuated between being open 24/7 and closing at 11PM EST. In 2018, the UF Student Government approved the library to be open 24/7, but since the onset of the COVID-19 pandemic, the library closes at night.

== See also ==
- University of Florida
- George A. Smathers Libraries
- Buildings at the University of Florida
