= UFDC =

UFDC may refer to

- United Front for Democratic Change, a rebel alliance based in eastern Chad
- University of Florida Digital Collections, digital resources from the University of Florida's library collections as well as partner institutions
