= Simon Katzenberg =

19th-century American politician

Simon Katzenberg was an American politician in Florida. A Republican, he represented the 10th District in the Florida Senate from 1868-1870.

He was a native white Floridian and the Florida Historical Quarterly described him as hurling allegations indiscriminately.

He chaired the Committee on State Affairs.

He chaired the Madison County Board of Public Instruction.
