= University of Florida Marston Science Library =

Science and engineering library in Gainesville, Florida, United States

Coordinates: 29.6479°N 82.3440°W

Marston Science Library
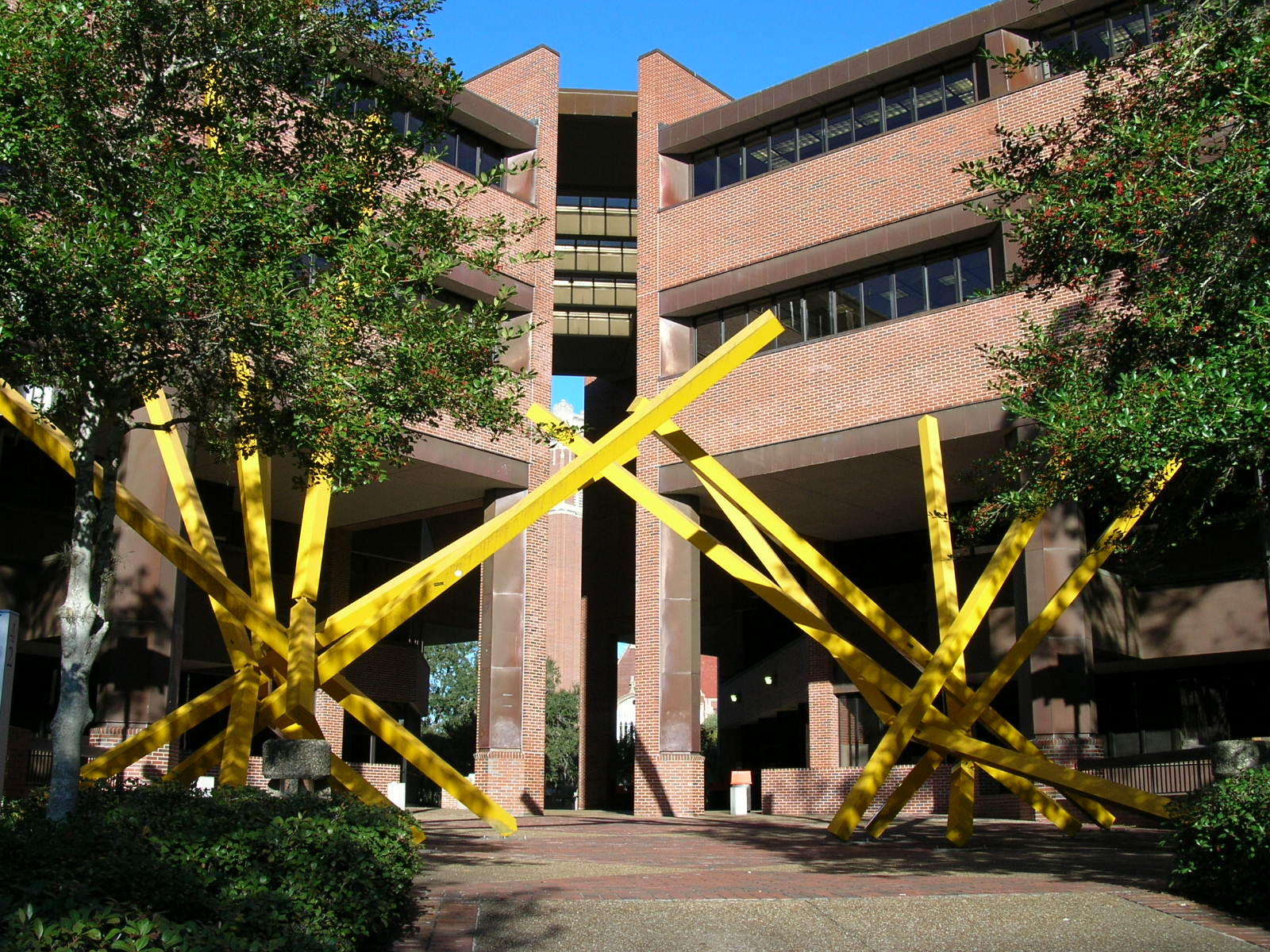
- Type: Public
- Established: 1987
- Location: Gainesville, Florida, United States
- Website: Marston Science Library

The Marston Science Library, often called Marston, is the science and engineering library of the University of Florida (UF) located in Gainesville, Florida. Administered by the university's George A. Smathers Libraries system, Marston hosts the university's extensive collections in agriculture, biological sciences, chemical and physical sciences, engineering, mathematics, and statistics, as well as librarians trained to help students and faculty working in these fields. It is located in the center of UF's campus adjacent to campus landmarks such as Turlington Hall, the University Auditorium, and Century Tower.

== History ==
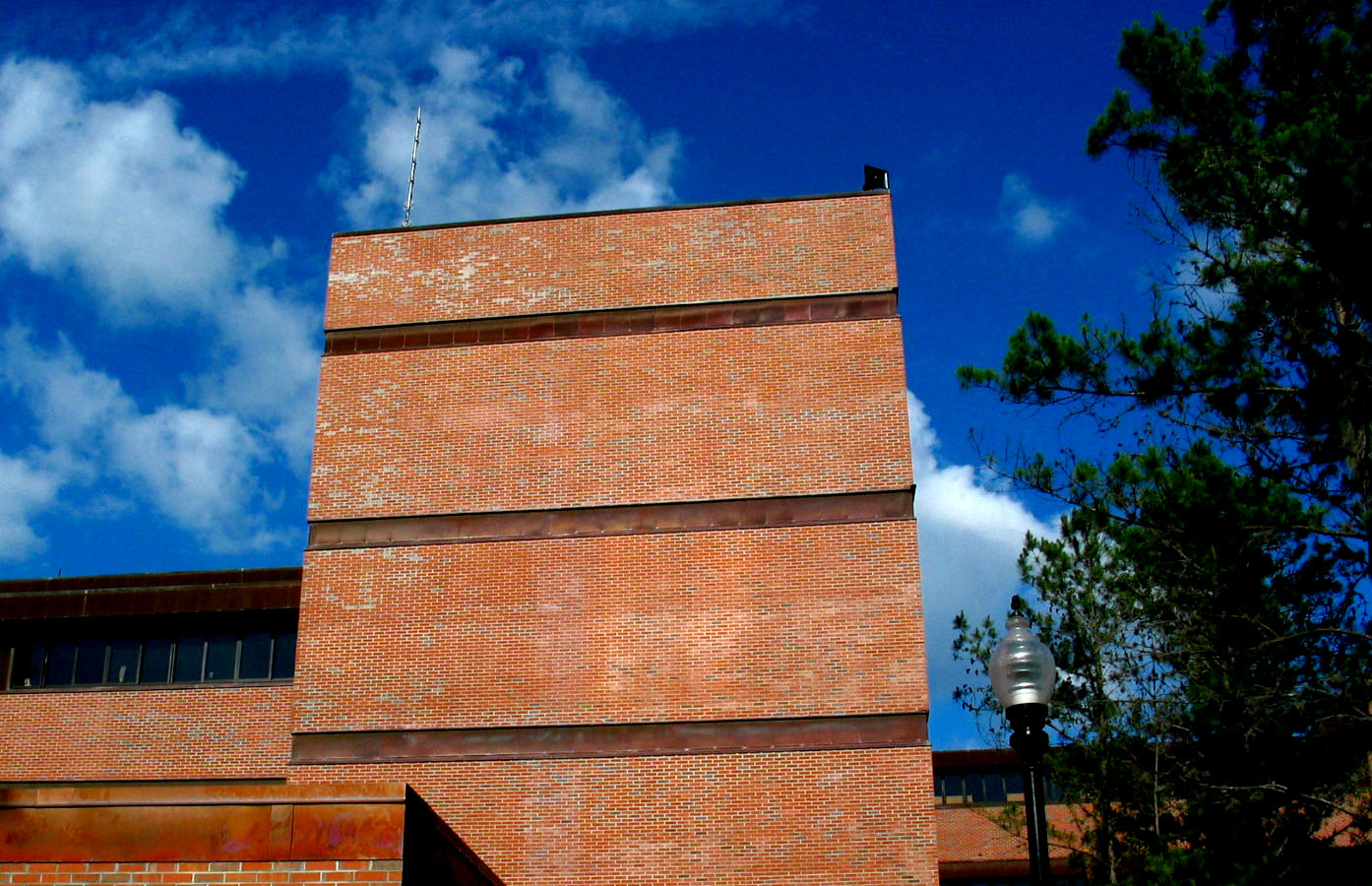
Marston Science Library exterior

The Marston Science Library was named for the seventh president of the University of Florida, Robert Q. Marston, who served from 1974 to 1984. Marston was a medical doctor, research scientist and Rhodes Scholar, who previously served as the dean of the University of Mississippi School of Medicine (1961–1965) and the director of the National Institutes of Health (1968–1973).

Completed in 1987, the Marston Science Library brought together several existing science branch libraries, including the Agriculture Library (founded in 1905), the Physics Library (1909), the Botany Library (1909), the Engineering Library (1912), the Chemistry Library (1923) and the Biology-Geology Library (1947).

In 2008, Marston began hosting an annual competition, the Elegance of Science, in which University of Florida faculty, staff and students submit artwork on the topic of science.

== Collaboration Commons ==
Collaboration Commons is the name for the renovated first floor of the Marston Science Library. Completed in the Fall of 2014, the approximately $5.7 million project was designed to act as a progressive study area for students. The new study space includes the additions of more general seating, a conference room, and multiple group study rooms. Innovative technology was also added, with 3D scanning and 3D printing equipment, as well as a multi-touch visualization wall and the new MADE@UF Lab for creating mobile apps and games all included as a part of the project.

The first floor of the Marston Science Library was previously home to around 190,000 pre-1990 academic journals and the sizeable Government Documents Department and Map & Imagery Library collection. In order to make room for the new project, the government documents and the journals were moved to be stored at the Auxiliary Library Facility, and the Map & Imagery Library collection was moved across campus to the first floor of Smathers Library East.

== See also ==
- History of the University of Florida
- List of University of Florida buildings
- List of University of Florida presidents
- University of Florida Campus Historic District
