= Isser and Rae Price Library of Judaica =

Library within University of Florida

Coordinates: 29.6507°N 82.3416°W

- Type: Subsidiary
- Industry: Library
- Founded: March 1981
- Headquarters: Gainesville, FL, USA
- Key people: Rebecca Jefferson
- Parent: George A. Smathers Libraries
- Website: cms.uflib.ufl.edu/judaica/Index.aspx

The Isser and Rae Price Library of Judaica within the University of Florida Libraries' Special & Area Studies Collections supports the teaching and research missions of the Center for Jewish Studies and the University of Florida. The Isser and Rae Price Library of Judaica currently holds over 100,000 circulating volumes. The main library is located on the first floor of Library West. The Judaica special collections are held in the Judaica Suite in Smathers Library (East).

== History ==
The core collection of the Isser and Rae Price Library of Judaica was formed from the private collection of Rabbi Leonard C. Mishkin of Chicago, Illinois. At the time of its purchase by the University of Florida in 1977, Mishkin's library was the largest private collection of Judaica and Hebraica in America. This collection covered many different areas of Jewish scholarship in a number of languages but had a particular focus on Jewish periodicals. Mishkin's collection also contained a wide variety of festschriften, books produced to honor scholars, usually created by the scholarly community. Mishkin collected festschrifts of all types, including ones about events, rabbis and leaders, and Jewish community members. He also collected Yizkor books, which celebrate the anniversary of a person's death. For instance, one of Mishkin's Yizkor books was about a young Jewish girl on Ellis Island.

The Mishkin collection of around 35,000 volumes was purchased in part thanks to a National Endowment for the Humanities (NEH) Challenge Grant - the first ever awarded to a United States Research Library. This major award was matched by the first State of Florida Quality Improvement Funds.

Two large collections supplemented and complemented the Mishkin acquisition: Professor Shlomo Marenof's personal collection with its strengths in Hebrew literature (purchased in 1978), and Bernard Morgenstern's bookstore on New York's Lower East Side with its copies of major and lesser known Yiddish works (purchased in 1979). A smaller collection of mostly Ancient Near Eastern works and books on the Dead Sea Scrolls was later acquired from Theodor H. Gaster's private library in the 1980s.

In 1979, a fund was established to support the development of the Judaica library by Jack and Samuel Price, alumni of the University of Florida. Their gift of $400,000 was the largest single gift ever given to the UF Libraries up to that point, and it was the first time that a special collection in the University Library had been endowed. The Judaica Library was named for their parents, Isser and Rae Price. The library was formally named at a special dedication ceremony in March 1981.

The Price Library grew from 45,000 volumes to a collection of over 85,000 thanks to the efforts of its librarian of 30 years, Robert Singerman and his assistants Yael Herbsman, Joy Funk, Carol Bird and Emily Madden. In addition to the "3 M's Collection" (Mishkin, Marenof, and Morgenstern), Singerman continued Mishkin's tradition of festschriften, collecting newspapers and periodicals. By his retirement in 2006, Singerman had collected roughly 200 Jewish newspapers from all over the world, including rare anniversary editions. However, they were unprocessed, stored in binders and boxes with a simple card catalog. After receiving a UF Libraries Mini Grant in 2011, the library worked to digitize its valuable newspaper collection.

Initially located in Library East (Smathers Library) and then in Norman Hall from 1995, the Price Library was finally given a permanent home in Library West in 2006. The Library was rededicated 30 years later in 2011. A special collections wing to house the Judaica Library's special collections was opened in 2014. The Judaica Suite was designed by the renowned Florida architect and artist, Kenneth Treister, FAIA.

A second historic NEH Challenge Grant was awarded to the George A. Smathers Libraries in 2014 to build an endowment fund that will support the Judaica Library in its efforts to broaden access to Humanities resources relating to the Jewish experience in Florida, Latin America and the Caribbean. The fund will sustain the new online Jewish Diaspora Collection dedicated to providing global access to materials from these areas.

== The Judaica Suite ==
This special collections wing opened on January 19, 2014. Designed by Kenneth Treister, a UF alumni and architect, this wing is filled with his art and furniture as well as his rare chess set collections. The wing is composed of meaningful elements: abstract paintings about creation, a bronze sculpture depicting the parting of the red sea, and quotes from famous Jewish thinkers. Chairs are side by side at tables rather than across from one another, representing the Jewish tradition of studying together. Samuel Price and Charles Price made a large contribution for Samuel's son, Todd Carroll Price, which allowed for lights, art, and furniture.
