= Everglades Digital Library =

The Everglades Digital Library is hosted and supported by the Florida International University Libraries, in collaboration with Everglades National Park, the University of Florida Libraries, and numerous other agencies and research organizations. The Everglades Digital Library is a library with multiple large and growing collections that regularly add new materials, including scientific and technical reports, natural history writings, educational resources, maps, photographs, and additional contextual materials on and relating to the greater Everglades.
