= George A. Smathers Libraries =

Library system of the University of Florida

Coordinates: 29.650614°N 82.341520°W

- Location: Gainesville, Florida; Jacksonville, Florida

Collection
- Size: 6 million+ print volumes, 1.5 million digital books, 1,000+ databases, approximately 150,000 print/digital journals, 14 million digital pages

Access and use
- Population served: 3.6 million+ a year

Other information
- Director: Dean Judith C. Russell
- Employees: 626 Total. 90 (Faculty), 179 (Professional Staff), 30 (Additional Staff), 327 (Student Assistants)
- Website: https://uflib.ufl.edu/

The George A. Smathers Libraries of the University of Florida constitute one of the largest university library systems in the United States. The system includes eight of the nine libraries of the University of Florida and provides primary support to all academic programs except those served by the Lawton Chiles Legal Information Center. Previously the Health Science Center Library was also separate, but it was integrated into the Smathers Libraries on July 1, 2009. The current dean is Judith C. Russell. All of the libraries serve all of the university's faculty and students, but each has a special mission to be the primary support of the specific colleges and degree programs with which they are primarily affiliated. As is common in research libraries, library materials are housed in a variety of locations depending upon discipline. The three largest libraries cover an extensive range of disciplines while the smaller libraries focus on three or fewer disciplines.

== George A. Smathers Libraries and collections ==
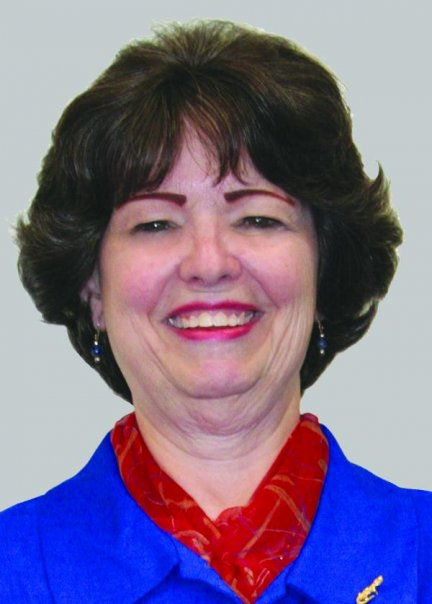
Dean Judith Russell

Library	Specifications
Library West	Is one of the main Libraries in the George A. Smathers Library System. It holds collections in the humanities and social sciences, including resources supporting the Warrington College of Business, African Studies, East Asian Area Studies, and the Isser and Rae Price Library of Judaica. This library completed a $30 million renovation in December 2003 that doubled its capacity, better equipped information technology, and added a Starbucks to the lobby.
Smathers Library (formerly Library East)	Located in the northeastern section of the University of Florida in the middle of the Campus Historic District, Smathers Library is the oldest library on the University of Florida Campus. On the first floor is the Map and Imagery Library. On the second floor is Special and Area Studies Collections which includes the University Archives, the Architecture Archives, the P. K. Yonge Library of Florida History, the Baldwin Library of Historical Children's Literature, Manuscript Collection, the Popular Culture Collections, the Judaica Suite, and the Rare Book Collection. On the third floor is the Latin American & Caribbean Collections. On the fourth floor is the Acquisitions & Collections Services Department and the Cataloging Services Department.
Marston Science Library	This is the other main library in the George A. Smathers Library System. It was named after former president of the University of Florida, Robert Q. Marston. The library supports agriculture, engineering, mathematics, and the natural and physical sciences. The basement (1st) floor of the Marston Science Library was renovated in summer of 2014 to become Collaboration Commons, a study and meeting space with seating for over 700. Another renovation of the 4th and 5th floors was completed in December of 2022.
Architecture and Fine Arts Library (201 Fine Arts Building A)	The materials held at the library support programs in the College of Design, Construction and Planning and the College of the Arts. The collection consists of over 125,000 volumes and over 12,000 sound and video recordings. The library provides collections and services for architecture, fine arts, historic preservation, interior design, museum studies, music, landscape architecture, and urban & regional planning.
Education Library (2-150 Norman Hall)	Materials in the collection support programs in the College of Education. The Education Library holds materials on the topics of education, child development, higher education, education psychology, counseling, and children's and young adult literature. The collection consists of about 80,000 monographic volumes and approximately 600 journal subscriptions.
Auxiliary Library Facility (ALF) (2715 NE 39th Ave, Gainesville, FL 32609)	Is an offsite storage facility designed to alleviate space constraints in the University of Florida Libraries. In addition, ALF houses two units from the Digital Services and Shared Collections Department: the Shared Collections Cataloging Unit and the Florida Academic Repository (FLARE).
Interim Library Facility (ILF) (4040 NE 49th Ave, Gainesville, FL 32609)	Is an offsite storage facility composed of three units from the Digital Services and Shared Collections Department: Digital Support Services, Conservation & Preservation, and the Florida Academic Repository (FLARE).
University of Florida Health Science Center Libraries	The Health Science Center libraries serve the academic, research, and clinical information needs of the six colleges that make up the J. Hillis Miller Health Science Center. The College of Dentistry at UF, the College of Medicine at UF, the College of Nursing at UF, the College of Pharmacy at UF, the College of Public Health & Health Professions at UF and the College of Veterinary Medicine at UF. In addition the Borland Library (2nd floor, Learning Resource Center) can be found at Shands Jacksonville which is the Jacksonville branch campus of the Health Science Center, and the Veterinary Medicine Reading Room is located in room V1-110 in the CoVM Medicine Building in Jacksonville, Florida.
University of Florida Digital Collections	The University of Florida Digital Collections are a constantly growing collection of digital resources from the University of Florida Libraries' collections as well as partner institutions. All materials are Open Access, and full text searchable. The UF Digital Collections' holdings include books, articles, newspapers, photos, videos, audio, and more. The SobekCM Open Source software powers all of the UF Digital Collections and related digital collections hosted at UF including the collaborative Digital Library of the Caribbean, the Florida and Puerto Rico Digital Newspaper Project (NDNP), the Baldwin Library Digital Collection, and the Florida Digital Newspaper Library. The UF Digital Collections System also powers record-only collections like NewspaperCat. As of May 2019, the collections had 1.5 million digital books, and more than 14 million digital pages available.

Libraries and collections include:

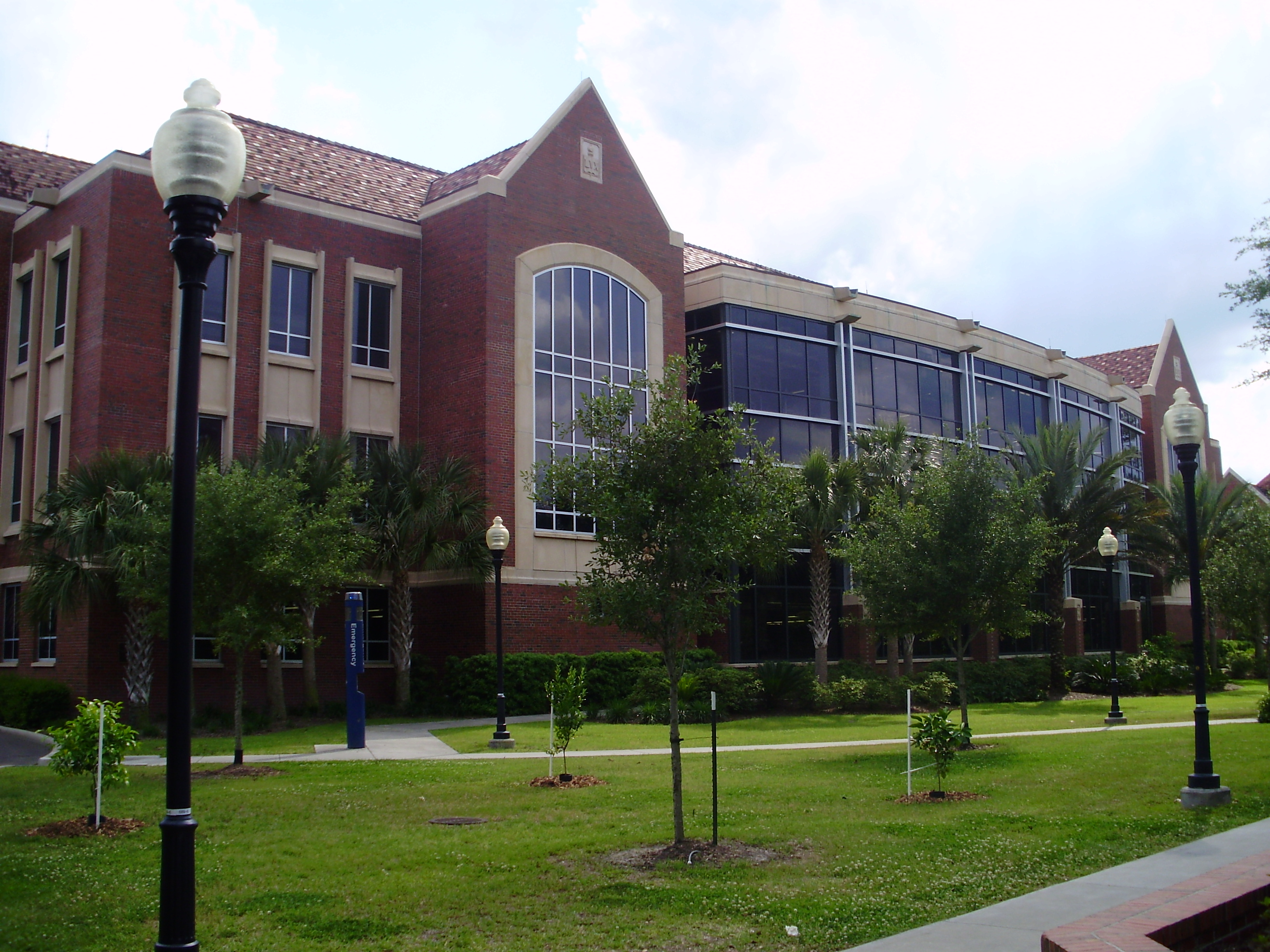
Library West

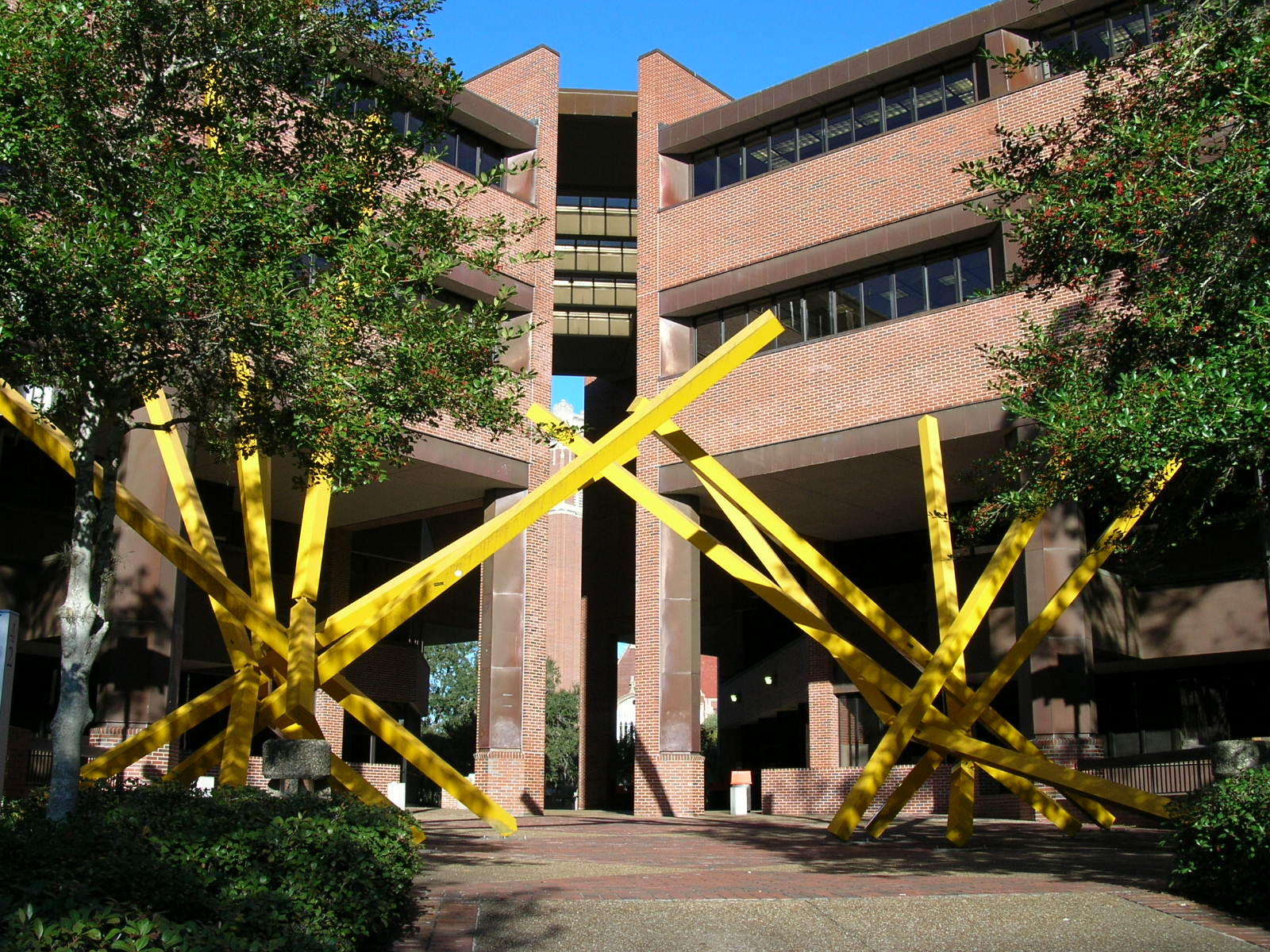
Marston Science Library

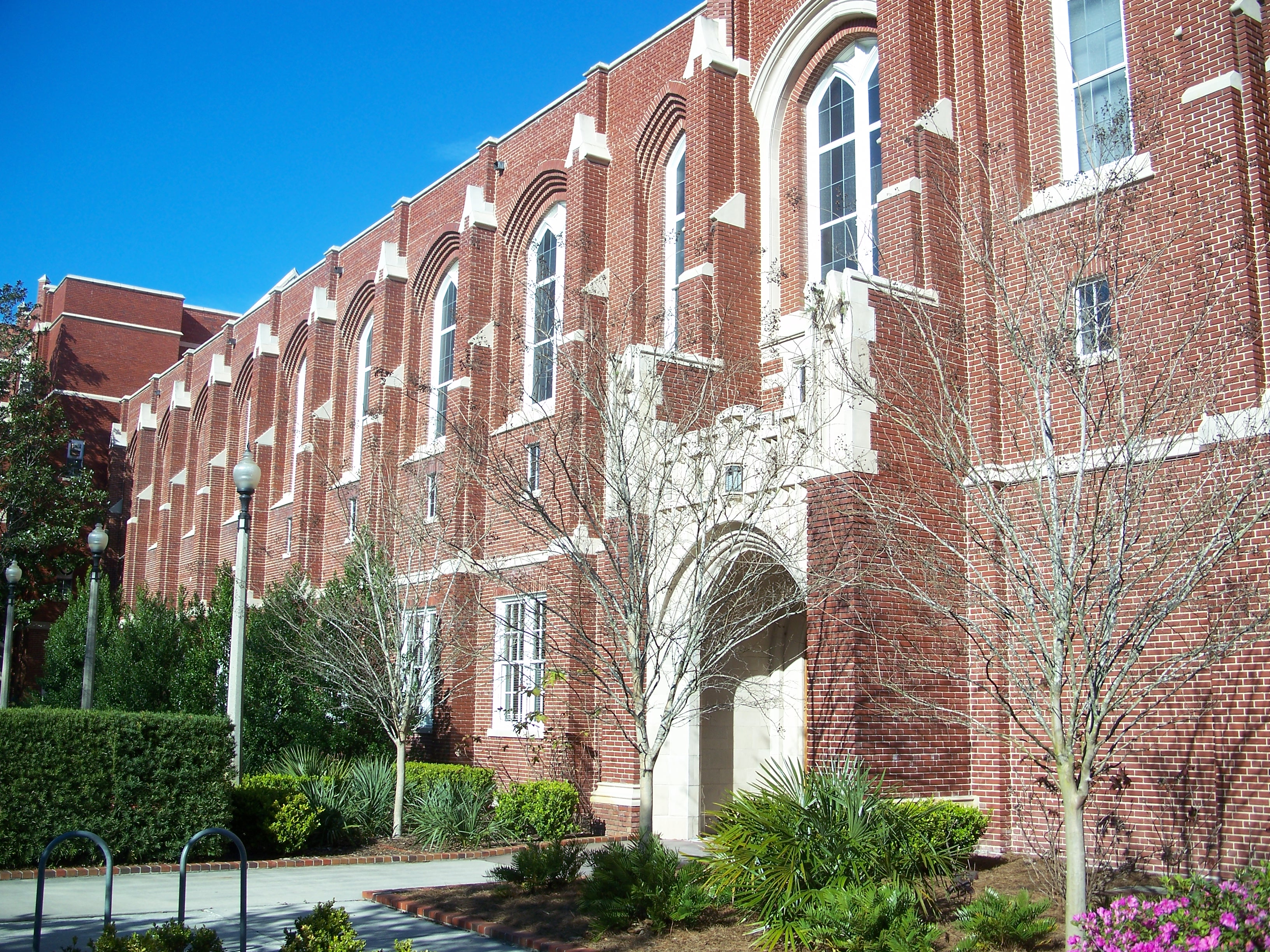
Smathers Library

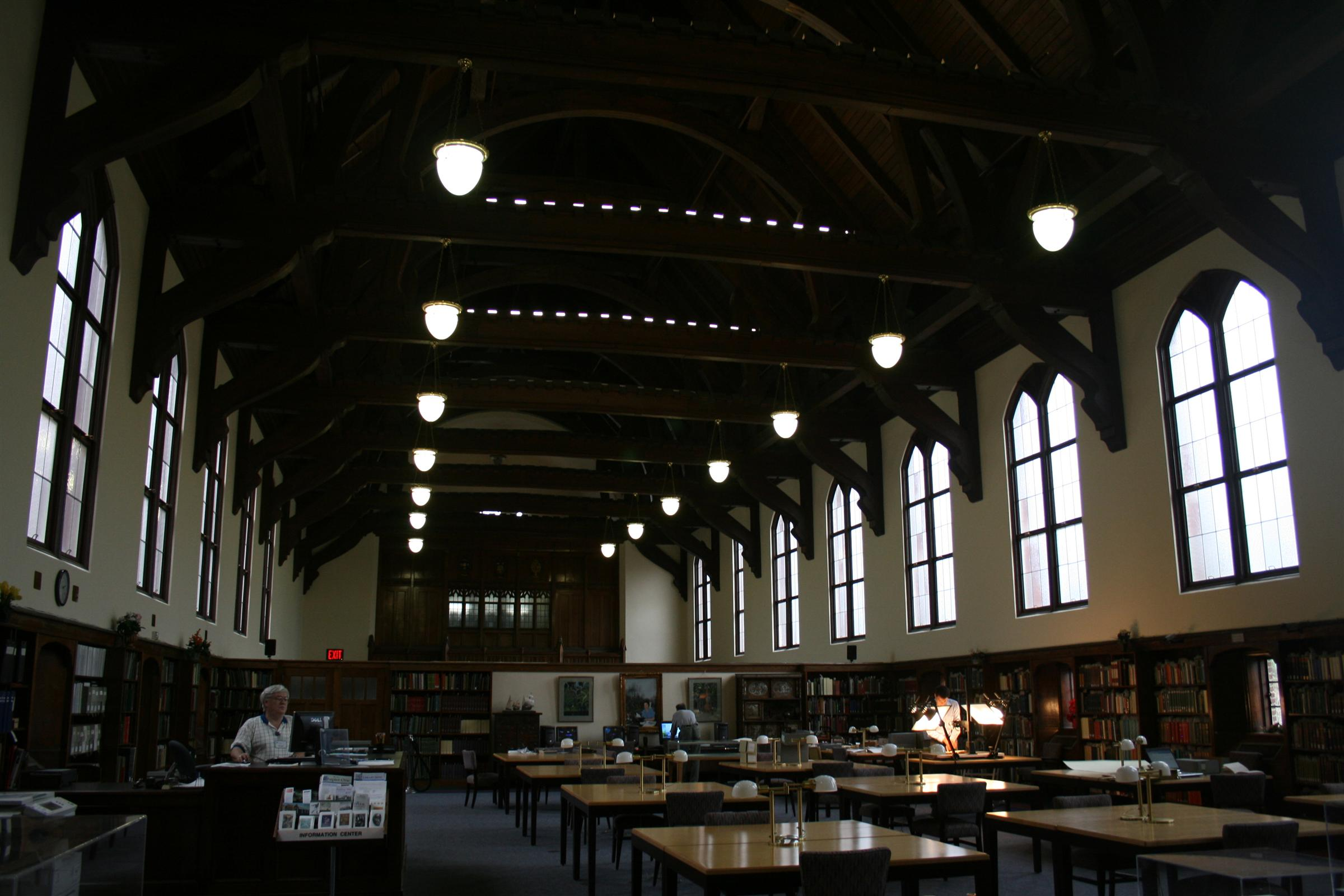
Special Collections Room at Smathers Library

== Other UF library collections ==
Library	Specifications
Lawton Chiles Legal Information Center	The Lawton Chiles Legal Information Center is part of the Levin College of Law and is not part of the George A. Smathers Libraries. Between 2004 and 2005 the Legal Information Center was renovated and renamed as the Lawton Chiles Legal Information Center in honor of the late Lawton Chiles; he was an alumnus of the University of Florida, and a former Governor and United States Senator who served the state of Florida with great distinction. This collection contains legal research materials supporting the study of state, federal, and international law. Notable collection areas include Florida, United States federal taxation, and British Commonwealth materials.

== Collection strengths ==
Together the Libraries hold 6 million+ print volumes, 1.5 million digital books, 1,000+ databases, approximately 150,000 print/digital journals, 14 million digital pages. The Libraries also administer the Florida Academic Repository (FLARE), a centralized shared print storage facility that houses millions of books from the State University System of Florida and the University of Miami.

The libraries have built a number of nationally significant research collections primarily in support of graduate research programs. Among them are collections discussed above, i.e., the Latin American Collection, the Isser and Rae Price Library of Judaica, and the Map and Imagery Library. Others include the Baldwin Library of Historical Children's Literature which is among the world's greatest collections of literature for children (Smathers Library, Special Collections); and the P.K. Yonge Library of Florida History, which is the state's preeminent Floridiana collection, holding the largest collection of Spanish colonial documents concerning southeastern United States in North America as well as rich archives of prominent Florida politicians, (Smathers Library, Special Collections).

The Libraries also have particularly strong holdings in architectural preservation and 18th century American architecture (AFA), late 19th and early 20th century German state documents from 1850 to 1940, Latin American art and architecture, (AFA and Smathers Library), national bibliographies (Smathers Library, Reference), U.S. Census information, especially in electronic format (Marston Science Library, Documents), the rural sociology of Florida and tropical and subtropical agriculture collections (Marston Science Library), English and American Literature, and U.S. Documents (Marston Science Library, Documents).

== Benefactor ==
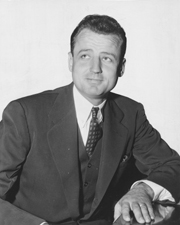
Senator George Smathers

The library system was named in honor of George A. Smathers, a former Florida senator. Smathers attended the University of Florida's school of law and served as student body president. He donated approximately $20 million to the University of Florida's library system in 1991, which was at the time the largest donation to a public university in the state of Florida.

== Brief history ==
The first librarian who managed the university library and its collections is recognized as C.A. Finley. In 1909 the Law Library, the Botanical Library, the Zoological Library, and the Physics Library were established. In 1910 the University of Florida's Agricultural Library, which had previously shared its space with the Main Library in Thomas Hall, was moved to Agriculture Hall. The University of Florida's Main Library was built in 1925 to house a growing collection of forty thousand books, numerous journals, and various documents. The fledgling library, which was constructed in the collegiate Gothic architectural style, consisted of a reference room, a reserve reading room, and offices. In 1938, for the first time, the UF Library allowed books to circulate outside the library. In 1941 the libraries automated their book circulation and fines using an IBM punch card and sorting machines. The annual meeting of the Florida Library Association was held in Gainesville in 1950. It was hosted by the Director of the UF Libraries, Stanley West. The assembly also included the inauguration of a new addition to the main library building and a donation by Marjorie Kinnan Rawlings of many of her papers and manuscripts for the creation of a Creative Writing Collection. In 1963 the libraries hit another milestone with the acquisition of their one-millionth volume. In 1967 The University of Florida's Graduate Research Library opened (which in 1970 was to be renamed Library West), and the Main Library became the Undergraduate Library (which in 1970 was to be renamed Library East). This resulted in students and patrons alike being able, for the first time, to browse open stacks. The same year the Veterans Affairs Medical Center Library also opened. During the 1970s the UF Libraries underwent noteworthy developments in automation. This was mainly done by installing terminals with access to the bibliographic utility OCLC and other online databases, along with the acquisition of its first computer programmer, and the creations of a Systems department. The UF Libraries acquired the NOTIS software in 1980. They did so to run a PC-based, automated online card catalog and circulation system. In 1987 a new Science Library (later renamed the Marston Science Library) is opened at the University of Florida. The library was created from the merger of several science branches, including the Hume Agriculture Library.

== See also ==
- Library West
- Marston Science Library
- Smathers Library
- University of Florida Digital Collections (UFDC)
- Baldwin Library of Historical Children's Literature
- Isser and Rae Price Library of Judaica
- Lawton Chiles Legal Information Center
