= Judith C. Russell =

- Born: December 31, 1944 (age 81); West Point, NY
- Education: Catholic University of America
- Known for: Being the dean of the George A. Smathers Library System at the University of Florida; Being the first woman and the second librarian superintendent of documents
- Scientific career
- Fields: Library Science
- Workplaces: University of Florida

Judith Ann Coffey Russell (born 1944) is the former dean of University Libraries at the University of Florida. She is the first dean of the University of Florida George A. Smathers Libraries, with the position elevated to the dean rank from a directorship to reflect the increased importance of the libraries and information for the University of Florida. She held the position from May 2007 to July 2025.

== Superintendent of Documents at the U.S. Government Printing Office ==
Prior to her position at the University of Florida, Russell served as the 22nd superintendent of documents at the U.S. Government Printing Office from 2003 to 2007. It was her responsibility to provide public access to government information published by the U.S. Congress, Federal agencies and the federal courts. As the superintendent of documents, she was responsible for a staff of 220 employees with an annual budget of $70 million. From 1998 to 2003 she served as the deputy director for the U. S. National Commission on Libraries and Information Science (NCLIS).

== Education ==
- Bachelor's degree from the Dunbarton College of the Holy Cross
- Master's degree in library science from Catholic University of America

== Publications ==
- Celebrating serendipity and collaboration
- Meeting the Information Needs of the American People: Past Actions and Future Initiatives04529/http://nclis.gov/about/MeetingtheInformationNeedsoftheAmericanPeople-NCLISFinalReport.pdf
