= Kenneth Treister =

American architect (1930–2026)

Kenneth Treister, FAIA (1930 – August 28, 2026) was an American architect, architectural historian, sculptor, photographer, author and lecturer. He was a Fellow of the American Institute of Architects and is best known for the Holocaust Memorial he built in Miami Beach, Florida.

In 1985, Treister received a commission to design, build, and sculpt a Holocaust Memorial in Miami Beach. The Memorial opened in February 1990 and welcomes thousands of visitors every year.

== Background ==
Kenneth Treister was born in 1930. His father, Arthur Treister, a real estate businessman, and his mother, Anita Treister moved to Miami Beach from Flushing, Queens when he was a baby. After World War II, Kenneth and his brother Leonard joined their father's business as Arthur Treister and Sons. He had a music scholarship to the University of Miami in 1948 and was elected president of the freshman class. He then transferred to the University of Florida, graduating in 1953 with a degree in architecture.

Treister lived in Miami-Dade County for most of his life, primarily in Coconut Grove. He later lived in central Florida. Treister died on August 28, 2026, at the age of 96.

== Works ==
- Mayfair Shops, Coconut Grove, FL
- Mayfair House Hotel, Coconut Grove, FL
- Office In The Grove, Coconut Grove, FL
- Yacht Harbour Condominium, Coconut Grove, FL
- Elizabeth Virrick Park, Coconut Grove, FL
- Holocaust Memorial of the Greater Miami Jewish Federation, Miami Beach, FL
- Chertsey Condominium, Cable Beach, Nassau, Bahamas
- Conchrest Condominium, Cable Beach, Nassau, Bahamas
- Out Island Inn (Phase I and II), George Town, Great Exuma, Bahamas
- Colonial Drive Elementary School, Dade County, FL
- Sophie and Nathan Gumenick Chapel for Temple Israel of Greater Miami, FL
- Temple Emanu-El of Greater Miami (remodeled), Miami Beach, FL
- Isser and Rae Price Library of Judaica suite, University of Florida, Gainesville, Florida
- Orlev Factory, Sderot, Israel
- Orbond Gypsum & Gypsum Products Industries Ltd, Afula, Israel (1993)
- Housing Corporation of America (HCA) public housing projects throughout the U.S. for both elderly and family housing (a Turn-Key Low Cost Housing Program by the U.S. Department of Housing and Urban Development)
- Sadie Kahn Memorial Park, Sebring, Florida

== The Kenneth Treister Collection ==
The Kenneth Treister Collection is located in the University of Florida Digital Collection as part of its Architecture Archives. It includes architectural drawings, project files, correspondence, publications and writings, photographs, documentary films, and other materials spanning from the 1950s into the 21st century.

Another large collection of documents, photography, artifacts and articles about Treister's work can also be found in the Jewish Museum of Florida at Florida International University where a section in the permanent exhibition Mosaic is dedicated to Treister and the Holocaust Memorial.

== Non-architectural works ==
More than 50 newspapers and magazines throughout the world have published Treister's articles on architecture. He also shot four documentaries: The Architecture of the Maya, The Architecture of the Eastern Island, The Holocaust Memorial Miami Beach—the later one being awarded a 1999 Telly Award. He was the author of numerous books about art, history and architecture. Books published included:

- Frank Lloyd Wright at the University of Florida (2018)
- Gardens, Architecture & Art: The Humanistic Architecture of Kenneth Treister, foreword by Tom Wolfe (2017)
- The Fusion of Architecture & Art: The Judaic Work of Kenneth Treister (2015)
- Easter Island's Silent Sentinels: The Sculpture and Architecture of Rapa Nui (2013)
- Bok Tower Gardens: America's Taj Mahal (2013)
- Maya Architecture: Temples in the Sky (2013)
- Havana Forever: A Pictorial and Cultural History of an Unforgettable City (2010)
- Cherubim & Palm Trees: The Judaic Art of Temple Emanu-El (2003)
- Chapel of Light: The Sophie & Nathan Gumenick Chapel, Temple Israel of Greater Miami (2000)
- Habaneros: Photographs of the People of Havana (1997)
- A Sculpture of Love and Anguish: The Holocaust Memorial, Miami Beach, Florida (1993)
- Chinese Architecture, Urban Planning, and Landscape Design (1987)
