= Baldwin Library of Historical Children's Literature =

Coordinates: 29.6510435°N 82.341806°W

- Type: Subsidiary
- Industry: Library
- Founded: April 24, 1977
- Headquarters: Library West, Gainesville, FL, USA
- Parent: George A. Smathers Libraries
- Website: cms.uflib.ufl.edu/sasc/Index.aspx

The Baldwin Library of Historical Children's Literature, located in the Department of Special and Area Studies Collections at the University of Florida's George A. Smathers Libraries, contains more than 130,000 books and serials published in Great Britain and the United States from the mid-17th century through the present. Its holdings of more than 800 early American imprints is the second largest such collection in the United States. The product of Ruth Baldwin's 40-year collection development efforts, this assemblage of literature printed primarily for children offers a large territory of topics to explore: education and upbringing, family and gender roles, civic values, racial, religious, and moral attitudes, literary style and format, and the arts of illustration and book design.

== Collection Strengths ==
Cover of Fairy Tales from Grimm, from the Baldwin's collection (1894).

One of the strengths of the Baldwin Library collection is its large number of comparative editions of classic stories such as Robinson Crusoe, Pilgrim's Progress, Aesop's Fables and Alice's Adventures in Wonderland. It also houses considerable collections of juvenile biography, 19th century science and natural history, 19th century alphabet books, moral tales, fairy tales, 19th century juvenile periodicals, 19th century boys' Adventure Stories, 20th century boys' and girls' series, Little Golden Books, pop-up books, and juvenile publications of the American Sunday School Union and other tract societies. The Baldwin Library has the largest collection of Early American Juvenile Imprints of any U.S. academic institution.

The Baldwin Library has received three NEH grants to digitize its books and the digital versions are continually being added to the Baldwin Library's Digital Collection which had over 929,000 pages online in August 2011, all within the University of Florida Digital Collections. The Baldwin Library is also a contributor to the International Children's Digital Library.

== Origin ==
Ruth M. Baldwin was born September 29, 1918, to Thomas Whitfield Baldwin and Regina Elisabeth Petrich. Thomas Baldwin was a renowned Shakespeare scholar whose own collection served as a model for Ruth's. His wife, Elisabeth, gave Ruth a collection of English chapbooks for her 35th birthday in 1953. The package included 40 chapbooks. Ruth described her excitement about this gift in her diary. Elisabeth continued gifting Ruth books throughout 1953, adding up to 300-400 books. Ruth continued collecting over the next 20 years, purchasing books at shops and garage sales In the 1970s, Baldwin began to consider the possibility of donating her collection as it was growing too big for her house. On April 29, 1975, Baldwin visited the University of Florida to attend a lecture from Joy Anderson, a UF professor and author. Anderson spearheaded UF's proposal for the collection, and on April 24, 1977, Baldwin's collection was moved from her Louisiana home to the University of Florida. Baldwin moved with her collection, serving as its curator and librarian.
