= University of Florida Center for Latin American Studies =

Academic center at the University of Florida

- Established: 1931
- Dean: Dr. Philip Williams (director)
- Location: Gainesville, Florida, USA; 29°38′57.4″N 82°20′31.5″W
- Website: http://www.latam.ufl.edu/

The University of Florida Center for Latin American Studies is one of the largest centers in the United States for the study of Latin American, Caribbean, and Latino Studies. Specialized degrees are offered in a wide range of subjects including the anthropology, history, sociology, politics, geography, and languages of the region.

== Mission ==
The Mission of this center is to increase knowledge about Latin America and the Caribbean, and the culture of peoples throughout the Hemisphere. In addition, the Center has been charged to enhance the quality of research and the overall scope of teaching & outreach in Latin America and the Caribbean.

== History of the Center ==
The Center was first created as the Institute for Inter-American Affairs by the former University of Florida President John J. Tigert in 1931. After previously serving as the United States Commissioner of Education he realized the interest in foreign affairs in the nation’s political, commercial, and academic circles. He believed it was a necessity for the University of Florida to fill this mission due to its geographical proximity to the Caribbean and South America.

In 1951 the Center changed its name to the School of Inter-American Studies in order to coordinate degree programs with a Latin American emphasis. In 1952 the first Doctorate of Philosophy was offered in Latin American Studies, and in 1961 the school received a large grant from the Rockefeller Foundation, so that a Caribbean Research Program could be facilitated. In the Fall of 1963, the School of Inter-American Studies was officially renamed the Center for Latin American Studies.

== Library ==
The University of Florida Latin American Collection has over 400,000 volumes and 1,100 serial titles. The collection covers all disciplines & geographical areas of Latin America (with particular emphasis on the Caribbean and Brazil). The Center currently has the sixth largest Latin American collection in the United States. In addition the Center also has the largest Caribbean collection in the world.

== See also ==
- University of Florida College of Liberal Arts and Sciences
- University of Florida Latin American Collection
