= Digital Library of the Caribbean =

- Website type: International education
- Available in: Multilingual
- Owner: Caribbean
- Creator: Caribbean
- Website: dloc.com
- Commercial: No
- Launched: March 17, 2006
- Current status: Online

The Digital Library of the Caribbean (dLOC) is an international digital library operated collaboratively by the contributing partners.

== Partners ==
Current partners continue to grow on a regular basis and are listed on the dLOC Partner Page. Partners include the Archives Nationales d'Haïti (National Archives of Haiti), Biblioteca Nacional Aruba (National Library of Aruba, Caribbean Community (CARICOM) Secretariat, Caribbean Studies Association, University of The Bahamas, the Fundación Global Desarollo y Democracia (FUNGLODE), the National Library of Jamaica, Belize National Library Service and Information System (BNLSIS), Pontificia Universidad Católica Madre y Maestra (PUCMM), the Universidad de Oriente in Venezuela, Florida International University, the University of the Virgin Islands, the University of Central Florida, the University of South Florida, the University of Florida, and WIDECAST (the Wider Caribbean Sea Turtle Conservation Network). The Digital Library of the Caribbean received a US Department of Education Technological Innovation and Cooperation for Foreign Information Access (TICFIA) grant in 2004, which is administered by Florida International University, the University of Florida Libraries, and the University of the Virgin Islands. The technical infrastructure is provided by the University of Florida Digital Collections.

In 2018, the partners confirmed a new design for dLOC, including a new logo.

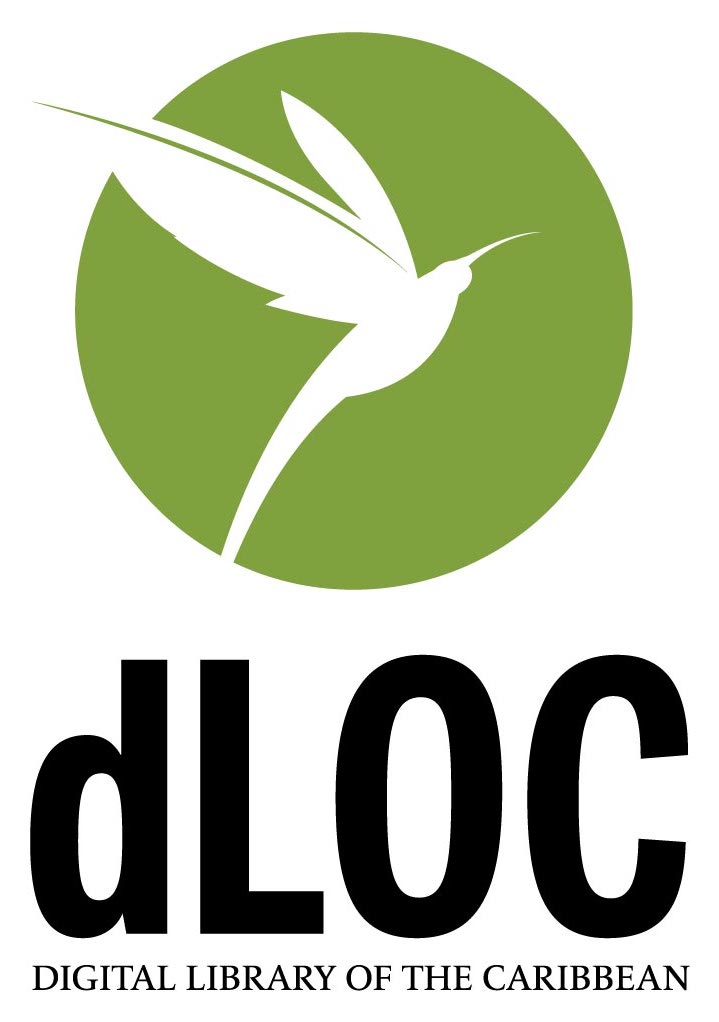

== Collections ==
Collections include books, photographs, archives of Caribbean leaders and governments, legal documents, official historical documents, literature (novels, poetry, journals, and more), art, audio-visual materials, and historic and contemporary maps. Collections also include Caribbean studies journals and scholarly publications including the New West Indian Guide, MaComère, the Jamaica Journal, and many others.

The Digital Library of the Caribbean provides open access to all materials, and all materials are full text searchable with JPG2000 images that load quickly but can be zoomed for detail, and the multiple formats support the digital preservation of materials in the Digital Library of the Caribbean. As of June 2019, the Digital Library of the Caribbean held 157,451 items comprising 3,447,483 pages built from the ongoing digitization of new materials from partner institutions.

== History and concept ==
As a digital library, the Digital Library of the Caribbean was established as led by Judith V. Rogers with a committee of librarians, scholars, and archivists at a meeting held in San Juan, Puerto Rico on July 17, 2004. The goal of dLOC is to build a cooperative digital library among partners within the Caribbean and circum-Caribbean, thus providing scholars, students, and citizens around the world with open online access to Caribbean cultural, historical and scientific materials, while also ensuring long term preservation of these materials. The Digital Library of the Caribbean draws on the many connections among the partner institutions and the University of Florida's role in collecting, enabling access to, and preserving materials published in the Caribbean under and prior to the Farmington Plan.

Shamin Renwick of The University of the West Indies explains in detail why the dLOC is necessary.

- It will help fill gaps among individual institutions' collections, bringing together a more complete history of the area.
- The dLOC will provide a key role in identifying new or perhaps even previously inaccessible topics. This is of particular importance to developing countries.
- The region is prone to disasters and weather that is not hospitable to preservation of physical items.
- The cost of transport is high in the area - discouraging physical visits to libraries among the islands.

== Technologies ==
The Digital Library of the Caribbean is powered by the SobekCM software engine and suite of associated tools.
