= The Florida Historical Quarterly =

- Cover of the Winter 2024 issue
- Discipline: History
- Language: English
- Edited by: Connie L. Lester

Publication details
- Former names: Publications of the Florida Historical Society, The Florida Historical Society Quarterly
- History: 1908 to present
- Publisher: Florida Historical Society (United States)
- Frequency: Quarterly

Standard abbreviations
- ISO 4: Fla. Hist. Q.

Indexing
- ISSN: 0015-4113
- JSTOR: 00154113

Links
- Journal homepage; FHQ at PALMM

The Florida Historical Quarterly is an American academic journal, published four times a year by the Florida Historical Society.

== History ==
Organized on November 26, 1902, and chartered three years later, the Florida Historical Society was the successor to the Historical Society of Florida, formed in 1856. According to its charter, the society's mission was twofold: "the collection, arrangement and preservation of all materials pertaining to the history of, or in any manner illustrative of Florida . . . [and to] prepare, edit and publish articles, sketches, biographies, pamphlets, books and documents, descriptive or illustrative of Florida". To fulfill the second objective, the Society initiated the Publications of the Florida Historical Society in April 1908, the predecessor to The Florida Historical Quarterly.

Both the collections and the publication depended on whether "our members and friends will sustain us with such financial aid as may be necessary". At the time, annual dues were five dollars, but society officers still had trouble collecting. "Don't make it necessary for those who are devoting their time and labor in the interest of the Society, without financial compensation, to have to send a second notification to delinquent members", said President F.P. Fleming in 1908.

== About the Florida Historical Society ==
Today, the Florida Historical Society has grown from its early days in a "commodious" room of the Jacksonville Public Library to its current home in a renovated U.S. Post Office in Cocoa, Florida. The society has evolved in its mission as well: dedicated to preserving Florida's past through collection and archival maintenance, through scholarly research and publication, and through public history, historic preservation, and youth education.

== The Florida Historical Quarterly ==
The Florida Historical Quarterly has likewise evolved. From his office at the University of Florida, Professor Samuel Proctor edited the journal for nearly thirty years, from 1964 to 1993, before handing editorial control over to Professor George E. Pozzetta at the University of South Florida. Less than two years later, however, Pozzetta died, and Proctor returned to the editorship until someone new could be found. In late 1995, Professor Jerrell Schofner succeeded Proctor as interim editor, establishing a partnership between the Florida Historical Society and the University of Central Florida. The following year, Professor Kari Fredrickson assumed editorship for a four-year term. Her interests in social history expanded the breadth of historical topics covered in the publication and further strengthened the journal.

In 2000, Craig Thompson Friend became the journal's editor. Under his editorship, the publication added an occasional feature called the "Florida Room". Named for the enclosed patios where Floridians, forced indoors by heat, mosquitoes, and humidity, entertain guests and casually relax, mingle, and share informal essays, the Florida Room feature is designed to engage readers more directly in recent regional developments.

Since 2005, Connie L. Lester, Associate Professor in History, has been the journal's editor. In 2011, the publication added an assistant editor, Daniel Murphree, Associate Professor in History.

Published four times annually, the journal promotes scholarly research and appreciation for the peoples, places, and diversity of Florida's past. A peer-reviewed journal, the publication has entered the digital world in several ways. It produces a podcast for each issue featuring an interview with one or more authors. The website will also feature images and interactive research. Past issues of the journal are available online through JSTOR and the Publication of Archival, Library & Museum Materials (PALMM). Finally, with the addition of a digital editor, the publication has initiated new research using the journal itself to understand new historiographic paradigms.

Throughout its history, the journal has been a central component of the mission of the Florida Historical Society to promote scholarly research and publication. Dr. John B. Boles, editor of the Journal of Southern History, has offered repeated praise for The Florida Historical Quarterly, calling it "one of the three best state journals published in the South and one of the very best of its kind published in the nation", citing the articles as "well-chosen, skillfully edited, [that] reflect the highest academic standards".

== See also ==
- List of history journals
