= National Library Service of Belize =

Belize National Library

The National Library Service of Belize was founded in 1825. It is the legal deposit repository for Belize. It is headquartered in Belize City.

The Library is governed by a board of directors consisting of ten members, eight of which are appointed by the Minister of Education to represent a cross-section of Belizean society.

Belizean citizens may use the library upon application for a membership card, which costs $3. Non-citizens may obtain a card for $43, $40 of which is refundable upon departure from the country.

The Library Service utilizes the Dewey Decimal Classification System.
