= Smathers Library (Gainesville, Florida) =

- Library East
- U.S. National Register of Historic Places
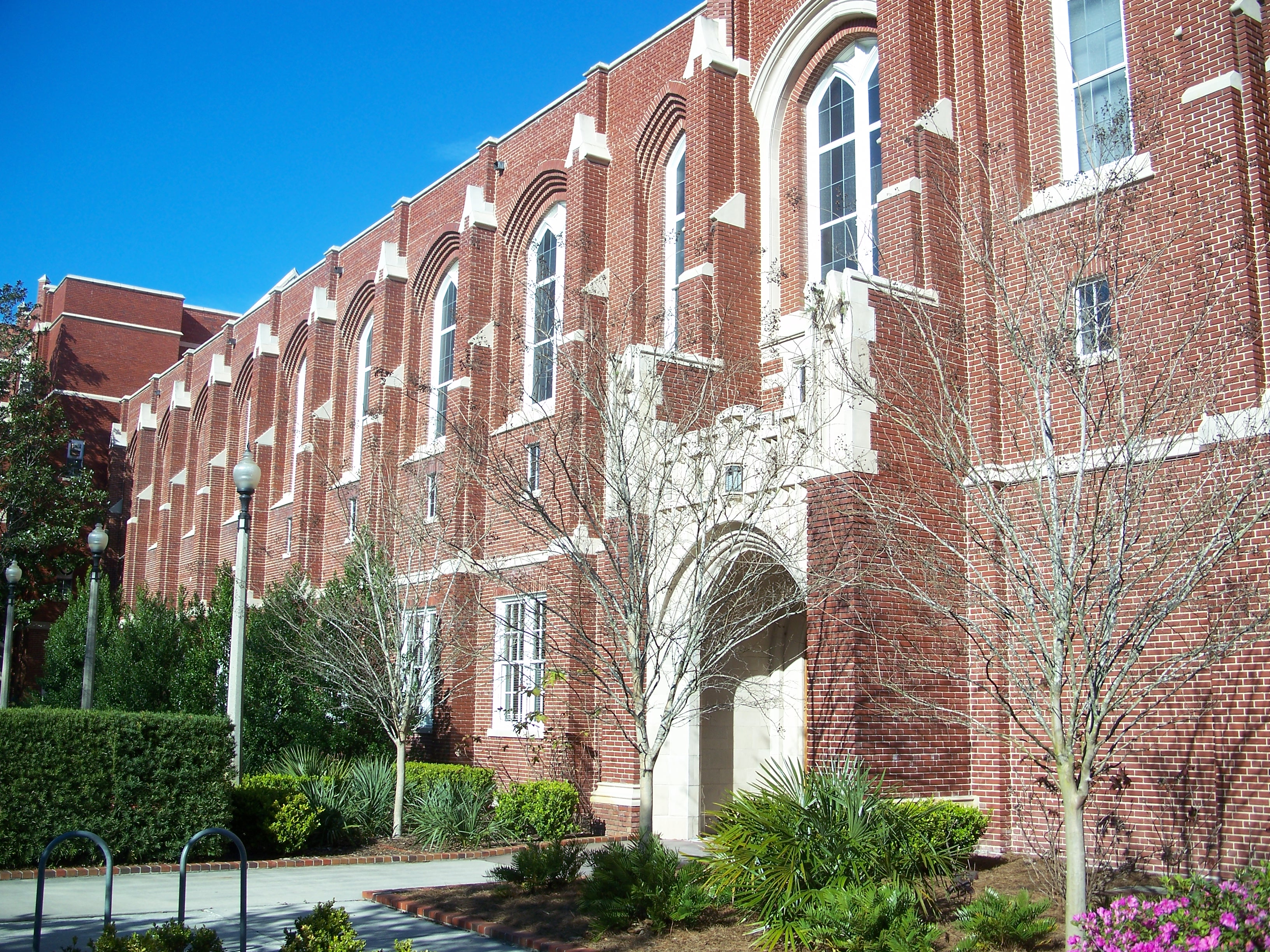

- Location within Florida Location within the United States
- Location: Gainesville, Florida
- Coordinates: 29°39′2″N 82°20′31″W
- Architect: William A. Edwards; Guy Fulton
- NRHP reference No.: 79000656
- Added to NRHP: June 27, 1979

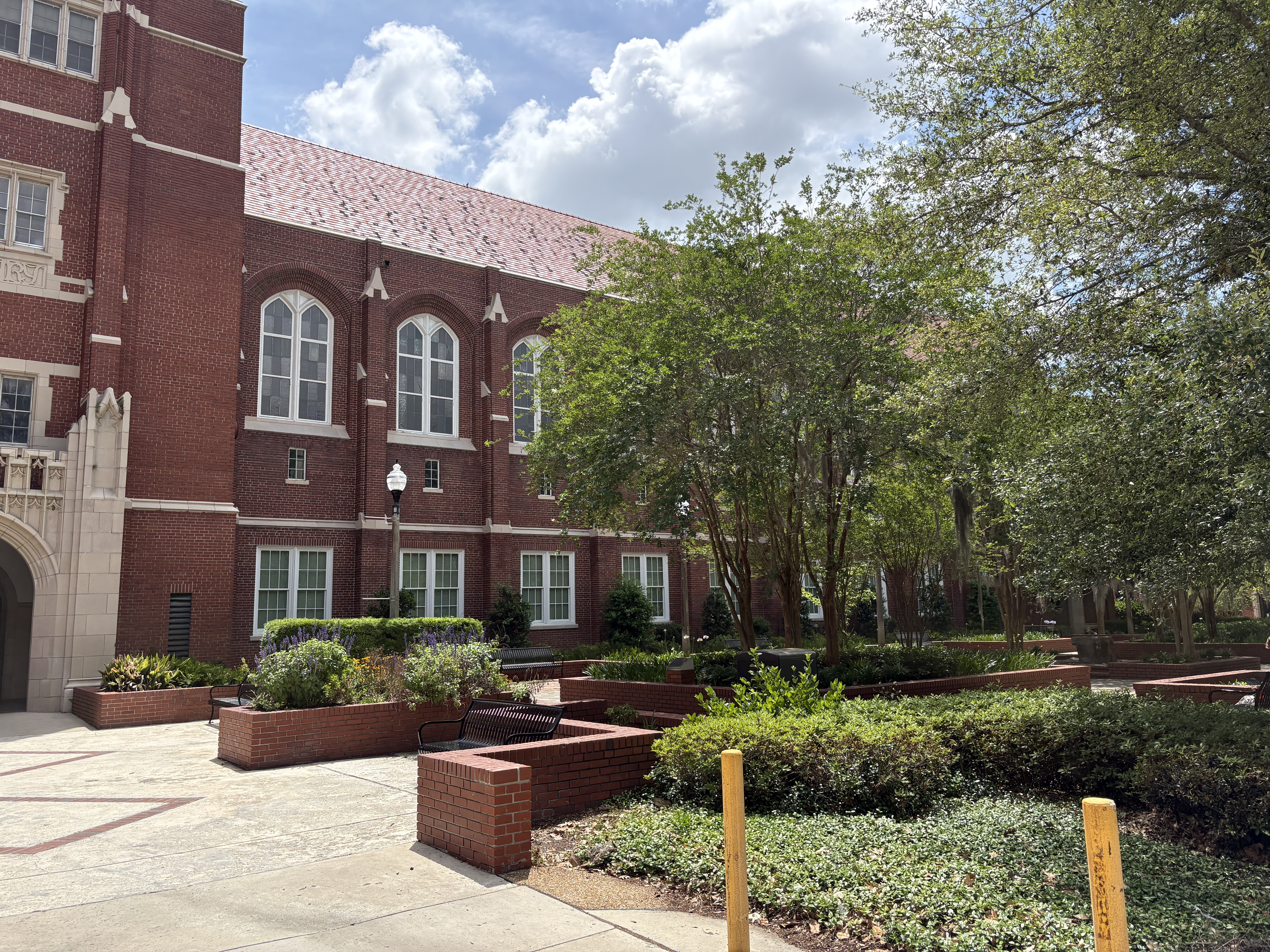
Smathers Library

Smathers Library (previously known as Library East) is a historic library in Gainesville, Florida, United States. It is located in the northeastern section of the University of Florida in the middle of the Campus Historic District. When it was first created it was the largest building on campus at that time. It is a part of the George A. Smathers Libraries system and home to multiple collections of books and other library materials.

== History ==
This facility was designed by the architect William A. Edwards and was first opened in October 1926. A major addition was designed by Florida Board of Control Architect Guy Fulton following World War II. On June 27, 1979, it was added to the U.S. National Register of Historic Places. In 1991 after a generous donation by the former United States Senator George Smathers the facility was officially renamed the Smathers Library.

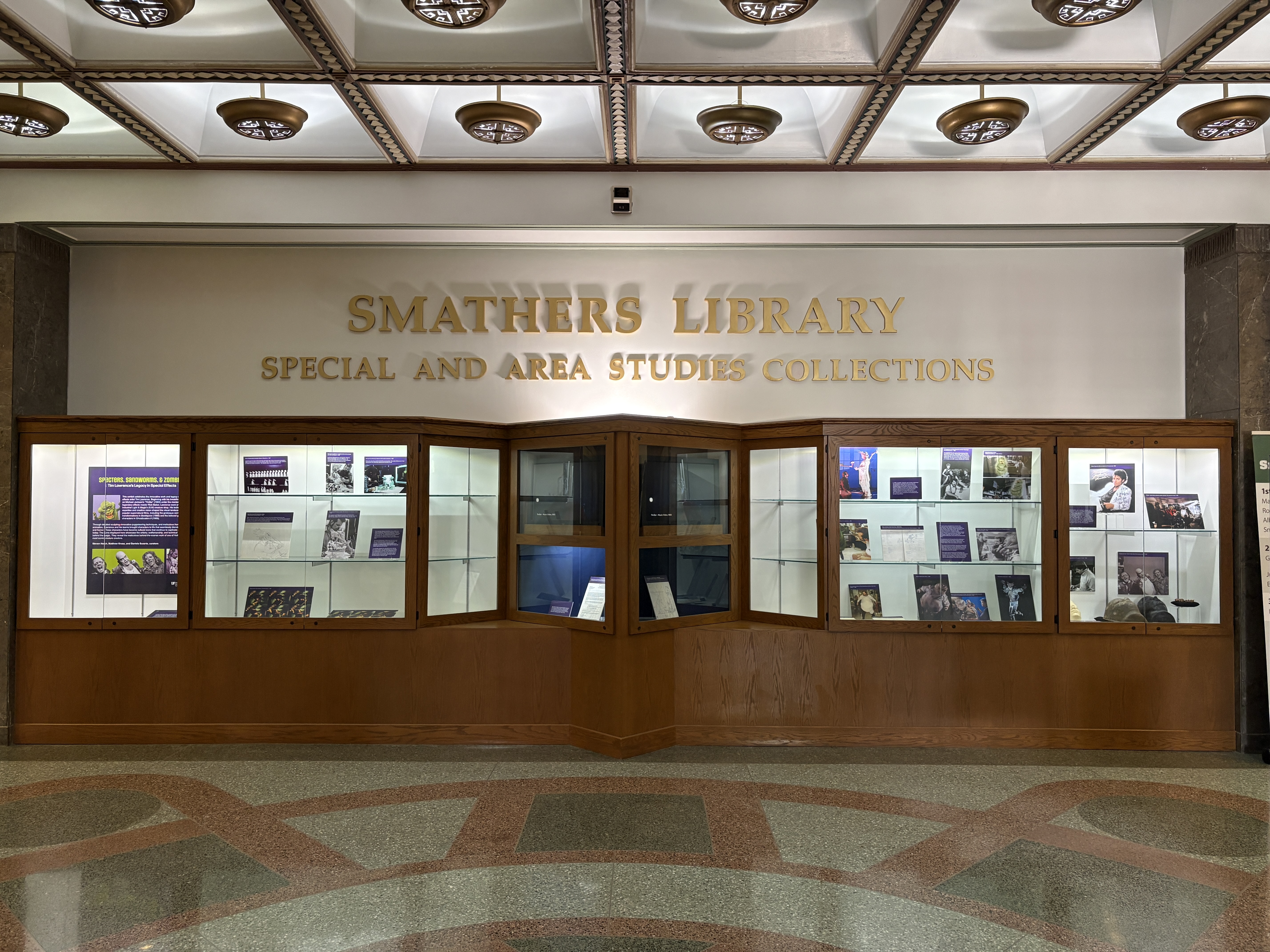
Entrance of Library East

== Map & Imagery Library ==
The Map & Imagery Library makes up a portion of the ground floor of the Smathers Library. It consists of several different collections which, combined, contain roughly 500,000 maps, 300,000 aerial photographs and satellite images, 8,000 atlases and reference books and an increasing number of geospatial datasets. It is one of largest academic map libraries in the United States. It specializes in content concerning Florida, Latin America, the Middle East and Africa and is open to the public every weekday.

== Special Collections Grand Reading Room ==
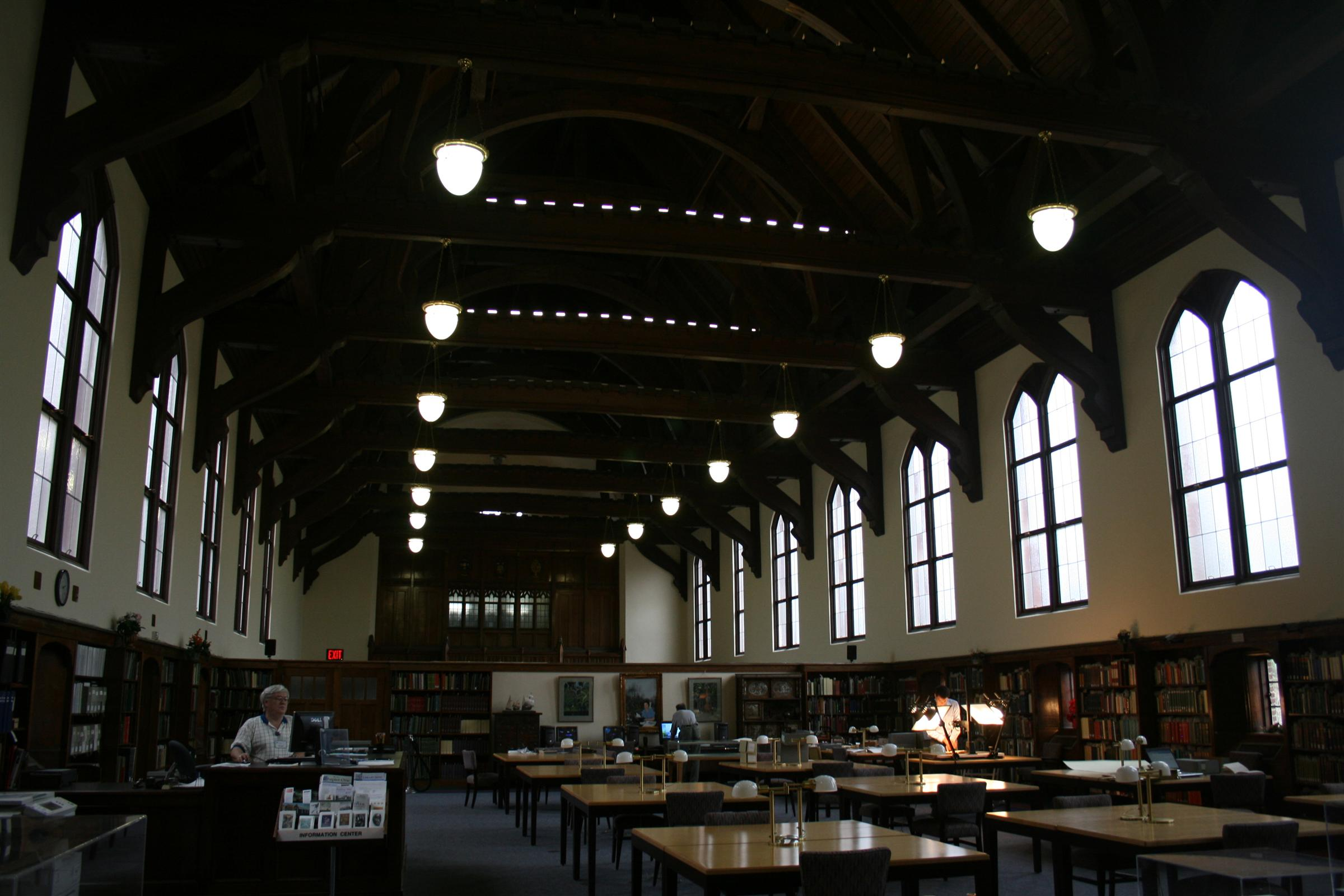
The Special Collections Room in Library East

The second floor of Smathers Library is home to the Special Collections Grand Reading Room. This space provides the primary source of access to many of the George A. Smathers Libraries' Special Collections materials. As many of the materials within these collections are not available to be checked out or loaned, any person interested in viewing them must do so in the Grand Reading Room, under the supervision of library staff. Collections which can be accessed through the Grand Reading Room include, but are not limited to, the University Archives, the Architecture Archives, the P. K. Yonge Library of Florida History, the Baldwin Library of Historical Children's Literature, the Manuscript Collection, the Popular Culture Collections and the Rare Books Collections.

In 1953, a UF Art Department faculty member Hollis Holbrook created a mural for the Grand Reading Room titled “History of Learning in Florida.” It is over 600 square feet and was created using egg tempera over several layers of sanded gesso directly on the wall over a period of about three months.

“History of Learning in Florida” depicts education in Florida. In the lower left corner, there is a portion on learning from contact and trade. The central image is a figure with the tree of life or knowledge. In the lower portion, there is a self-portrait of Holbrook holding a copy of the East Florida Gazette, the first newspaper published in Florida. Former library director, Stanley West, is pictured on Holbrook's right. There is also a scene featuring a celebration of the Fifteenth Amendment to the United States Constitution, picturing an African American Man voting alongside a white man. When asked about the mural, Holbrook said “the colors and the way it relates to the room are most important.”

Smathers Libraries hired conservators to evaluate and treat the mural in 2015 after the mural had acquired layers of dirt, dust, and nicotine damage. Restoration efforts took one week.

The mural features a small dedication inscribed on a chalk tablet: “dedicated to Nicky who died of polio in July 1952.” The tablet sits below a smiling boy, standing out from the mural as he is staring directly at the viewer. This dedication was only found after the 2015 restoration of the mural. Researchers determined that this dedication was referring to Holbrook's son, who died of polio in the early 1950s, though the name and exact death date of his son were not confirmed. The conservation treatment of the mural allows Nicky's dedication to live on in the Grand Reading Room.

== Judaica Suite ==
In January 2014, the Judaica Suite was opened as an annexing group of reading rooms accessed through the Special Collections Grand Reading Room. The alcoves of the Suite hold books from the university's Isser and Rae Price Library of Judaica, including many rare copies. Within the Suite, specific books are grouped together in different alcoves to represent various periods in the history of Jewish literature and culture. The Judaica Suite was designed by world-renowned architect and artist, and University of Florida alumnus, Kenneth Treister.

== Latin American and Caribbean Collection ==
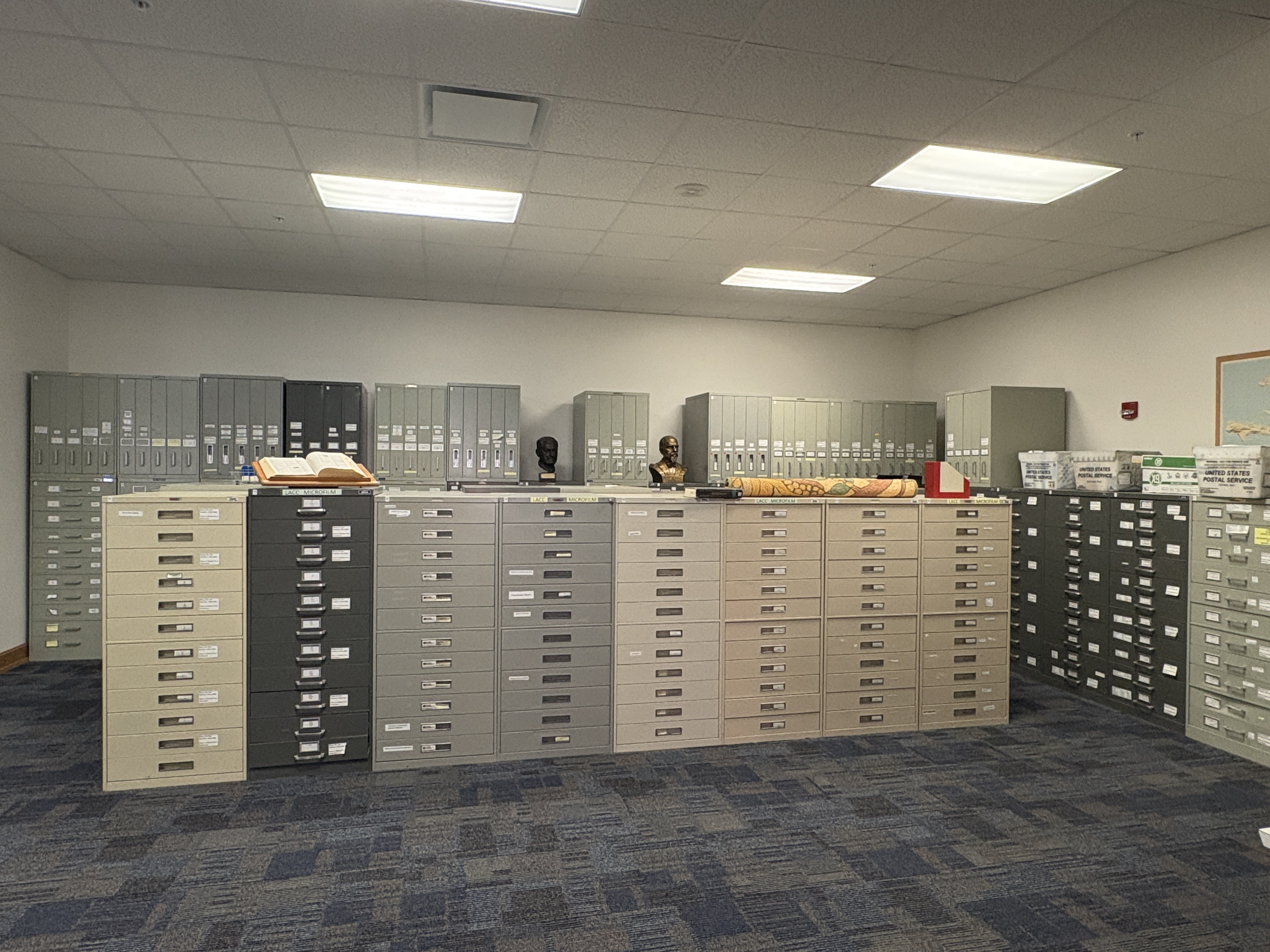
Latin American and Caribbean Collection Microforms

The Latin American and Caribbean Collection makes up the third floor of Smathers Library. This collection was founded in 1951, prompted by growing scholarly interest in Latin America and the Caribbean, and has since grown into one of the University of Florida's premier collections. The collection is housed in a newly renovated space and now consists of approximately 500,000 books, 50,000 microforms, thousands of journal titles and a considerable number of digital resources. About 70% of these resources are in Spanish, French, and Portuguese. Most of the remaining collection is in English, however, there are also materials in Haitian Creole, Dutch, and indigenous languages. Though the collection covers Caribbean and Latin American areas but focuses on the Caribbean and Brazil. Primary sources from the Caribbean are also available, ranging from agriculture to revolution. The library also has its own stacks, reading rooms, and reference services making it one of the few libraries left in the US to do so. The collection is open to the public and is usually open six days of the week.

== See also ==
- George A. Smathers Libraries
- University of Florida
- Buildings at the University of Florida
- George Smathers
- Campus Historic District
