= Lawton Chiles Legal Information Center =

University of Florida library

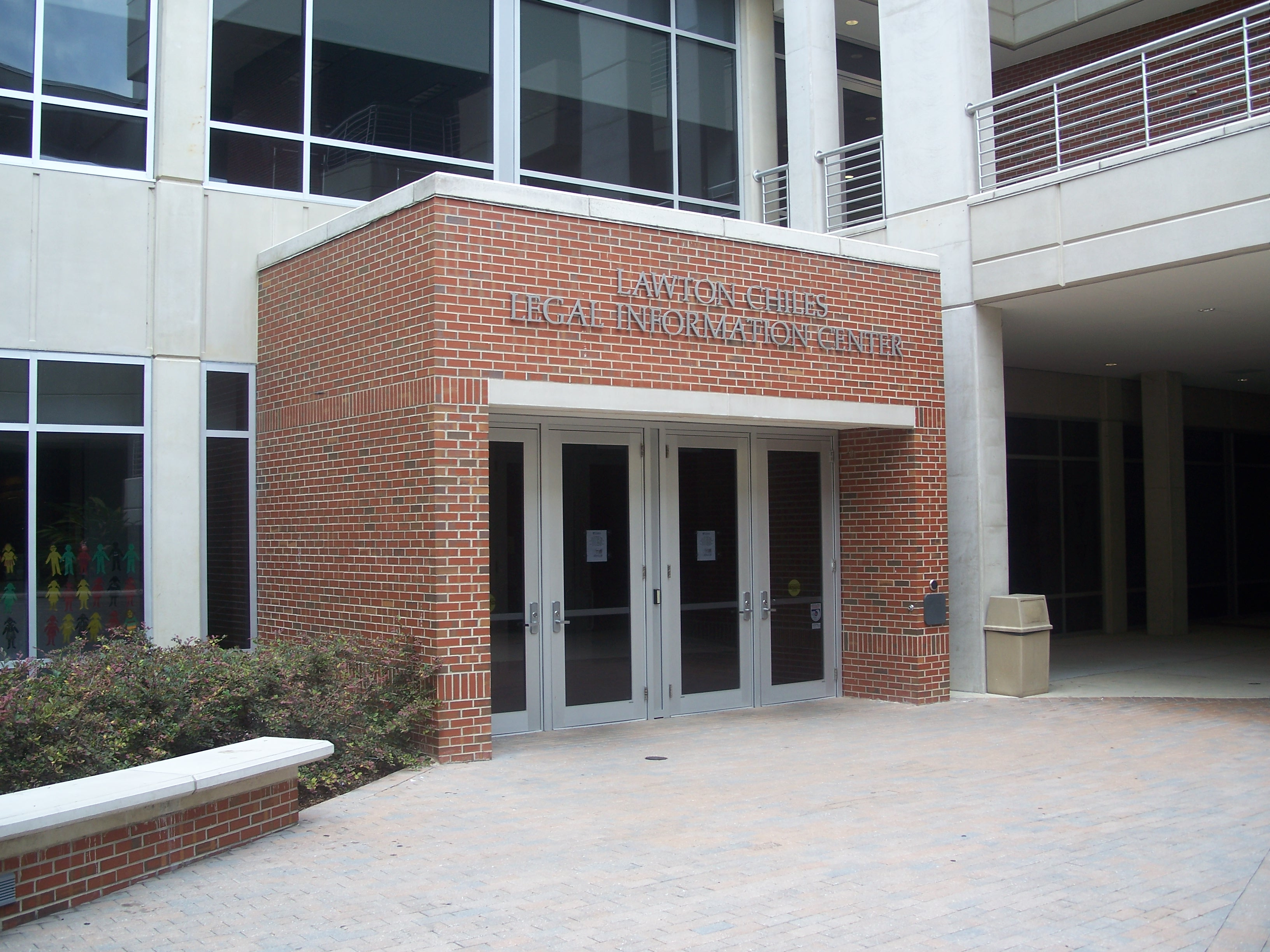
- 29.648575265648606°N 82.35959321611176°W
- Location: Florida, USA
- Type: academic library
- Established: 2005

Other information
- Affiliation: University of Florida
- Website: Library website

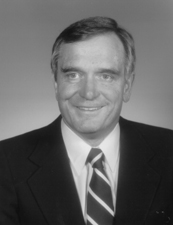
Lawton Chiles

The Lawton Chiles Legal Information Center at the Levin College of Law is part of the library system at the University of Florida. The Lawton Chiles Legal Information Center contains legal research materials supporting the study of state, federal, and international law. Notable collection areas housed by the library include materials on and relating to Florida law, United States federal taxation, and the British Commonwealth.

== 2005 renovation ==
Finishing its renovation in 2005, the Legal Information Center was renovated and renamed as the Lawton Chiles Legal Information Center in honor of the late Lawton Chiles. Chiles was an alumnus of the University of Florida, earning his law degree from the Levin College of Law in 1955. He was a former governor of Florida as well as a United States senator serving the Sunshine State.

The law library was recently moved to an expanded facility which doubled its size. Following the $25 million renovation, the law library is the largest academic law library in the Southeastern United States and amongst the top twenty in the United States. The law library now contains hundreds of thousands of books and microforms and includes rare historical texts relevant to the legal history of the United States.

== Using the Library ==
The Lawton Chiles Legal Information Center is not only the academic law library for the University of Florida, it is also a public facility. The University of Florida Legal Information Center in Holland Hall is open to the public. However, only UF students, faculty and staff have borrowing privileges, but any member of the public may use the resources in the library. Members of the Florida Bar may apply for Legal Information Center borrowing privileges with a valid Florida Bar card and driver's license.

== See also ==
- University of Florida
- University of Florida Levin College of Law
- Lawton Chiles
- Buildings at the University of Florida
