= Collective collection =

Form of collaboration between libraries

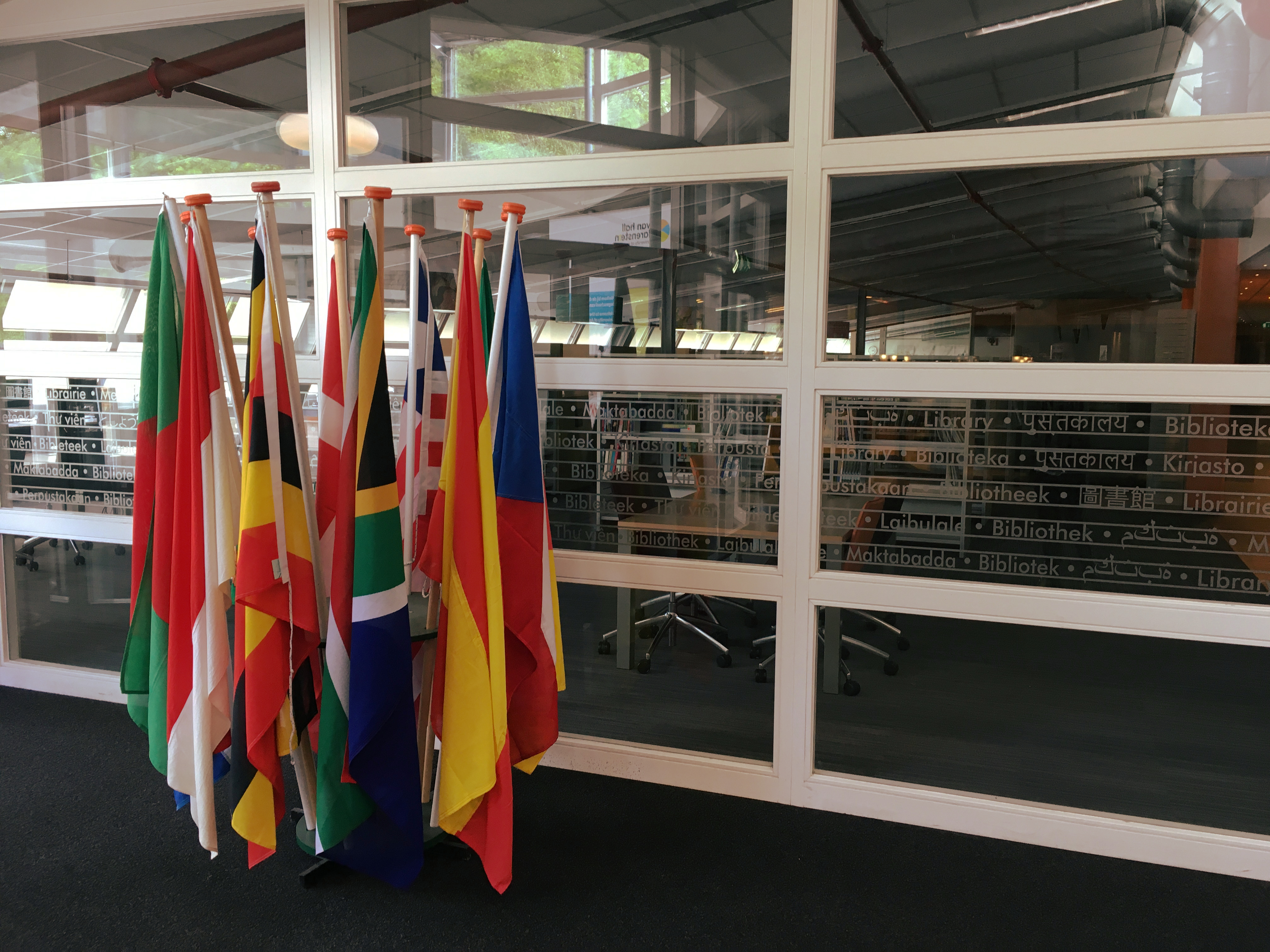
The academic library of Van Hall Larenstein, University of Applied Sciences, The Netherlands

A collective collection, shared collection, collaborative collection, or shared print program is a joint effort by multiple academic or research libraries to house, manage, and provide access to their collective physical collections. Most shared print programs focus on collections of monographs and/or serials. Similar efforts have addressed acquisition and/or retention of microform, federal government documents, and digital collections. Shared print programs often have activities in common with national repositories and archiving programs. Discussions surrounding shared print programs in their current form have come to the forefront as a popular solution to shrinking collection budgets, rising costs of resources, and competing space needs.

== Goals ==
The goal of shared print programs is to leverage a physical collective collection to preserve and provide access to the scholarly record in its original print form. Each library participating in a shared print program agrees to retain certain titles for a stated period of time, usually at least ten years. This practice ensures that the collective collection contains a predetermined number of unique items (such as specific editions of books and complete runs of journals) and that these items will be cared for and made available to all libraries participating in the shared print program. To prevent the loss of any given title, participating libraries determine an appropriate number of copies that should be retained, so that if one were lost or destroyed, other copies would remain available. Shared print programs base these decisions on the number of libraries involved, the total number of items held in retention, availability of the item outside of the program, and other factors.

Shared print programs also enable participating libraries to make informed decisions about weeding locally-held volumes that are duplicated in the collective collection. This practice enables libraries to create cost savings and to repurpose shelf space, whether to accommodate other print materials or to create a greater number and variety of spaces for users, especially students, to study, collaborate, teach, consult, and pursue other research and learning activities.

== Types ==
Two basic types of collection storage models exist. A distributed (or decentralized) collective shared print collection is one in which items in the collection are retained at the original library but are accessible to all partnering libraries. Centralized shared print collections are those in which books and journals are removed from the original library and stored in a shared shelving facility. In many cases this shared shelving facility is a high-density preservation facility built according to the Harvard model, featuring rigorous temperature and climate controls to facilitate preservation of materials, along with elevated stacks and special shelving methods to maximize storage efficiency.

Library consortia generally coordinate shared print programs. A consortium can create and manage a formal agreement (such as a memorandum of understanding), signed by each participating library's director, which ensures that certain books, journals, or other materials are both retained and made available to other libraries, generally through interlibrary loan. The consortium can also manage the analysis of each library's collection to divide the responsibility for retaining items equitably. The consortium can also establish criteria for shelving environments (to ensure long-term preservation), as well as outline the methods for providing access to titles to other participating libraries.

Library catalogs generally include indicators of which materials are part of a shared print agreement, making commercial vendors such as OCLC an important part of the shared print ecosystem. Some shared print programs such as CAVAL (Australia) or CSLS (Switzerland) may develop catalogs specifically for their collective collection. Many shared print programs are additionally tracked at a regional or national level. In the United States, the Center for Research Libraries (CRL) hosts a Print Archives Preservation Registry (PAPR) to record titles, holdings, and conditions of serials held in major shared print programs across the country. While there is no equivalent tool for monographs, other tools serve the shared print monograph community, such as Gold Rush Library Content Comparison System from the Colorado Alliance of Research Libraries, OCLC's GreenGlass, and HathiTrust Shared Print Registry. In 2018, CRL and OCLC were awarded a $1 million grant from the Andrew W. Mellon Foundation to enable collective collection retention commitments for serials to be reflected in the global union catalog WorldCat. In the United Kingdom, the United Kingdom Research Reserve (UKRR) developed the Linked Automated Register of Collaborative Holdings (LARCH) through which all Member Libraries’ holdings are run, and is now hosted by the British Library.

== Programs ==
Shared print programs may be regional or national in scale. National libraries and academic consortia often participate in shared print programs.

=== United States and Canada ===
In the United States and Canada, shared print programs are often a consortial effort. Libraries may also participate in collection sharing on an individual basis, such as participating in the HathiTrust Shared Print Program. Support organizations also exist, such as the Partnership for Shared Book Collections, Rosemont Shared Print Alliance, and North/Nord (North: the Canadian Shared Print Network/ Nord: Réseau canadien de conservation partagée des documents imprimés) that library consortia may join in order to increase collaboration, communication, and information sharing.

According to the Partnership for Shared Book Collections, participating programs have committed to retain over 38 million volumes.

=== Latin America ===
The following consortia do not participate strictly in shared print programs, but do participate in sharing collections of digitized print material:

- Consorcio de Bibliotecas Universitarias de El Salvador (El Salvador)
- Consorcio de Bibliotecas Universitarias del Caribe (Central American Caribbean and the Antilles)
- Association of Caribbean University, Research and Institutional Libraries

=== Oceania ===
- CAVAL Archival and Research Materials (CARM) Centre (Australia)
- CONZUL (Council of New Zealand University Libraries) (New Zealand)

=== Africa ===
African librarians have cited the lack of and need for shared print programs among libraries, due in part to insufficient infrastructure. Efforts focus more on consortia building than on shared print, and are mostly centered in southern Africa

- South African National Library & Information Consortium
- South East Academic Libraries System

=== Asia ===
- Consortiall-Joint University Library Advisory Committee (Hong Kong)

=== Europe & United Kingdom ===
- European Print Initiatives Collaboration (EPICo) (Multinational)
- United Kingdom Research Reserve (United Kingdom)
- White Rose University Consortium (United Kingdom)
- Sammlung Deutscher Drucke/Collection of German Prints (Germany)
- Der Speicherverbund Nord/Storage Network North (Germany)
- Centre technique du livre de l'enseignement supérieur (France)
- Kooperative Speicherbibliothek Schweiz/Cooperative Storage Library Switzerland (Switzerland)
- Varastokirjasto/National Repository Library (Finland)
- Shared Archiving Austria–Council of Austrian University Libraries (ubifo) (Austria)
- Consorci de Bibliothèques Universitàries de Catalunya/ Consortium of Academic Libraries of Catalonia (Spain)

== History ==
Libraries' efforts to collectively manage and provide access to their holdings date back to antiquity and, in the United States, extend through twentieth-century projects such as the Midwest Inter-Library Corporation (now CRL) and the Farmington Plan. Funding reductions and escalating storage costs, as well as space constraints, for physical collections in the 2000s created an environment where library directors needed to rely on partnerships with consortia and other libraries. Librarians began to write about shared print collections as one possible method of dealing with these mounting constraints. In 2002 Richard Fyffe argued that librarians needed to start a dialogue with stakeholders and patrons in the scholarly community about the need to rely more on collective collections. In 2004 Bernard F. Reilly (former president of the Center for Research Libraries) envisioned "drawing together the major independent regional and national repository initiatives into a coordinated, community-wide print preservation effort." The Print Archive Network Forum (PAN) was created in 2010 by the Center for Research Libraries as an information sharing opportunity between shared print professionals. In 2013 Lorcan Dempsey popularized the term "collective collections" in an OCLC research report. The trend toward collective collections has also received significant coverage in the mainstream press.
