= Farmington Plan =

The Farmington Plan was a twentieth-century collective collections initiative developed by American research libraries in order to ensure access to research materials and publications regardless of war or other events around the world. The plan created a cooperative acquisitions program for foreign materials by region and subject. Even prior to the Farmington Plan, some institutions had already developed their own foreign acquisitions and preservation programs, including the University of Florida, which preserved Caribbean materials and was only added later as partner in the Farmington Plan.

The Farmington Plan was directed from a central office located at the Harvard College Library.

This central office was responsible for financial coordination as well as maintaining and collating annual records regarding the plan. The office was initially supported by the Carnegie Corporation of New York and later by the Harvard College Library. Materials were selected and purchased by Farmington Plan Agents in foreign countries, classified, and shipped to participant libraries.

The plan was plagued with difficulties. Agents had difficulty classifying acquired materials, which led to delays in the placement of documents in library collections. In addition, differences in currency and international laws complicated materials acquisitions from foreign booksellers.

A 1967 conference,"The Impact of the Public Law 480 Program on Overseas Acquisitions by American Libraries," held at the Library School of the University of Wisconsin-Madison, assessed the Farmington Plan. The connection between PL-480 and the Farmington plan is also discussed in the article, "Measuring and Sustaining the Impact of Less Commonly Taught Language Collections in a Research Library."

Throughout its existence, numerous criticisms were leveled at the plan. Among these were the complaint that the plan would not assist in the acquiring of early-print manuscripts, or recent important printed works (which would be acquired by American library interests without the necessary intervention of the plan). Many important foreign documents, such as government publications or academic dissertations, remained beyond the plan's reach. In addition, many library professionals were dissatisfied with a perceived bias within the plan in favor of materials originating in Western European countries.

== History ==
The Farmington Plan's origins stemmed from the outbreak of World War II in 1939 and the ensuing lack of access to foreign research materials by American scholars, along with the destruction of many such materials during times of conflict.

In response to the war and its effect on scholastic access to material, Librarian of Congress Archibald MacLeish sent out a call for advice and suggestions on how best to handle the matter. Between 1939 and 1942 numerous suggestions and plans were put forward on the subject by several prominent American librarians of the time, all of which influenced the form of the plan at its inception.

The plan was initiated on October 9, 1942, when an advisory committee met in Farmington, Connecticut, to discuss collaborative collection development for preservation and access to foreign materials.

At its initial inception, the plan was known as the Proposal for a Division of Responsibility among American Libraries in the Acquisition and Recording of Library Materials and existed as an autonomous entity until it was formally incorporated into the Association of Research Libraries on March 1, 1944.

At its inception, the plan surveyed and collected material from Belgium and Mexico (1944), Peru, Spain, Sweden, Canada, France, and Italy (1945).

The outbreak of the Korean War in 1953 changed the scope and implementation of the Farmington Plan. Prior to the war it had focused primarily on the acquisition of scholastic materials, mostly from European countries. After 1953, the plan expanded to begin acquiring materials from outside western countries, and the plan's mission statement changed to emphasize the acquisition of materials with intelligence value

The plan went into decline through the 1960s and was eventually discontinued in 1972, in part due to the resurgent strength of the cross-Atlantic book markets after World War Two. However, the plan's legacy persists into the modern day in the form of numerous other cooperative foreign acquisition programs among American libraries.

== Additional reading ==
- Dempsey, D. (Fall 2004). "A History of the Farmington Plan". Libraries & Culture. 39 (4): 473–475.
- "Farmington Plan". Encyclopædia Britannica. Encyclopædia Britannica Online. 2009.
- Williams, Edwin E. (1953). Farmington Plan Handbook. Bloomington, Indiana: Association of Research Libraries. p. 170.
- Wagner, Ralph D. (2002). A History of the Farmington Plan. Lanham, MD: Scarecrow Press. p. 464. ISBN 978-0-8108-4259-5.
