= SobekCM =

SobekCM (alternately Sobek and Sobek CM) is an open-source software engine and suite of associated tools for digital libraries and digital repositories for galleries, libraries, archives, museums, colleges, universities, scholarly research projects as with the Digital Humanities, Research Data Collections, and more. The SobekCM software was developed initially at the University of Florida Libraries by Mark V. Sullivan, with much input from UF and collaborative partners, and ongoing development supported by the full team at the UF Libraries and the larger collaborative community. The largest digital repositories powered by SobekCM are the University of Florida Digital Collections (UFDC) and the Digital Library of the Caribbean (dLOC).

Within the University of Florida Libraries, Mark Sullivan began developing SobekCM in June 2005. The system went live in April 2006. In September 2011, Florida's Council of State University Libraries selected SobekCM to power digital libraries across the state with advanced functionality Development on SobekCM is active and ongoing, accelerated by numerous grants. In April 2012, the Jean-Marie Derscheid collection hosted and supported through SobekCM was part of the Center for Research Libraries' Primary Source Award for Access. In March 2012, NEH awarded a grant to the Historic St. Augustine project, another digital collection powered and hosted with SobekCM. Other major grants awarded from 2012-2013 include: the Florida and Puerto Rico Digital Newspaper Project, funded by the National Digital Newspaper Program (NDNP); Pioneer Days in Florida: Diaries and Letters from Settling the Sunshine State, 1800–1900, funded by NHPRC; Archive of Haitian Religion and Culture, funded by NEH; and Diário de Pernambuco Digital Newspaper Project, funded by the Center for Research Libraries' Latin America Materials Project; and the Panama Canal - Preserving a Legacy, Celebrating a Centennial, Leveraging an Extraordinary Human Achievement, funded by IMLS.

SobekCM is programmed in C# has been released as open-source software under the MIT License. The SobekCM software can be downloaded from the SobekCM Software Download Site, or GitHub. The SobekCM Software Download Site also includes documentation for installing and configuring the software.

== SobekCM Name ==
SobekCM is named in part for the Egyptian crocodile god, Sobek. SobekCM's name comes in part of the mythical Sobek's role as a collector of lost things, or "the idea that as a crocodile, Sobek is the best suited to collecting items upon the Nile." SobekCM is short for Sobek Content Management.
