= University of Florida Digital Collections =

Open access digital library

Coordinates: 29°39′3.2″N 82°20′30.6″W

Digital Collection (UFDC)
- Company type: Subsidiary
- Industry: Library
- Founded: April 2006
- Headquarters: Gainesville, Florida, United States
- Parent: George A. Smathers Libraries
- Website: ufdc.ufl.edu/

The University of Florida Digital Collections (UFDC) are supported by the University of Florida Digital Library Center in the George A. Smathers Libraries at the University of Florida. The University of Florida Digital Collections (UFDC) comprise a constantly growing collection of digital resources from the University of Florida's library collections as well as partner institutions. Founded in April 2006, UFDC has added over 622,114 items - books, newspapers, oral histories, videos, photos, data sets, and more - with over 14 million pages.

== Preservation and Access ==
A photograph titled "11 Women in costumes" (1930s) from the University Archive Photo Collection, one of the collections in UFDC.

The majority of materials are freely and openly accessible (Open Access) and provide full text searchability. In UFDC, all items can be text searched simultaneously or certain collections can be selected for a faceted search. Because UFDC grew out of the efforts of the University of Florida Libraries' Preservation Department, all items are scanned at preservation quality and all are digitally preserved with redundant backups. The page images are particularly important for the preservation of artifactually significant materials such as maps, artifacts, illustrated children's literature from the Baldwin Library of Historical Children's Literature, and other materials.

== Technologies, Statistics, and Findability ==
The UF Digital Collections are powered by the open source SobekCM software engine and suite of associated tools. The associated tools include online user tools and standalone software for use in digitizing and curating born digital materials. The online system is deployed with Solr and other technologies for optimal functionality.

Because of the highly visual nature of so many items, the pages are displayed as zoomable images (through a JPG2000 server) and all can be browsed as thumbnails at the item and the collection level. Artifacts with multiple photos from multiple angles can be seen in motion, rotating in an Adobe Flash video view, and items can be searched by their geographic information (city, county, state, latitude and longitude) or viewed on a map through UFDC's use of the Google Maps API.

UFDC includes books, articles, newspapers, photos, videos, audio, and more. As of June 2019, the collections had grown to over 14 million pages. UFDC's statistics page maintains a running tally of loaded items broken down by collection: http://ufdc.ufl.edu/stats/.

Along with loading new items regularly, UFDC is optimized for search engine findability on an ongoing basis.

== See also ==
- Digital libraries
- Libraries in Florida
