= Hough Graduate School of Business =

Graduate wing of Warrington College of Business

Coordinates: 29.6472°N 82.3447°W

- Type: Public
- Parent institution: Warrington College of Business
- Dean: Saby Mitra
- Location: Gainesville, Florida, USA
- Website: warrington.ufl.edu/about/hough/

The Hough Graduate School of Business is the graduate wing of the Warrington College of Business at the University of Florida. It is named after its alumnus, William R. Hough.

== Rankings ==
Hough Graduate School Full-Time MBA

- 25th overall by the U.S. News & World Report, 2020
- 1st in Florida by the U.S. News & World Report, 2020
- 21st (Global) Economist 'WhichMBA' 2018
- 14th (Global) QS Top MBA Rankings 2019

Online MBA

- 4th Best Online MBA Program by the U.S. News & World Report, 2020
- 5th in Admissions Selectivity by the U.S. News & World Report, 2018
- 5th Best Online MBA Program by The Princeton Review, 2018
- 7th (Global) Online MBA, Financial Times, 2018

Executive MBA

- No. 10 among public programs by Ivy Exec, 2018

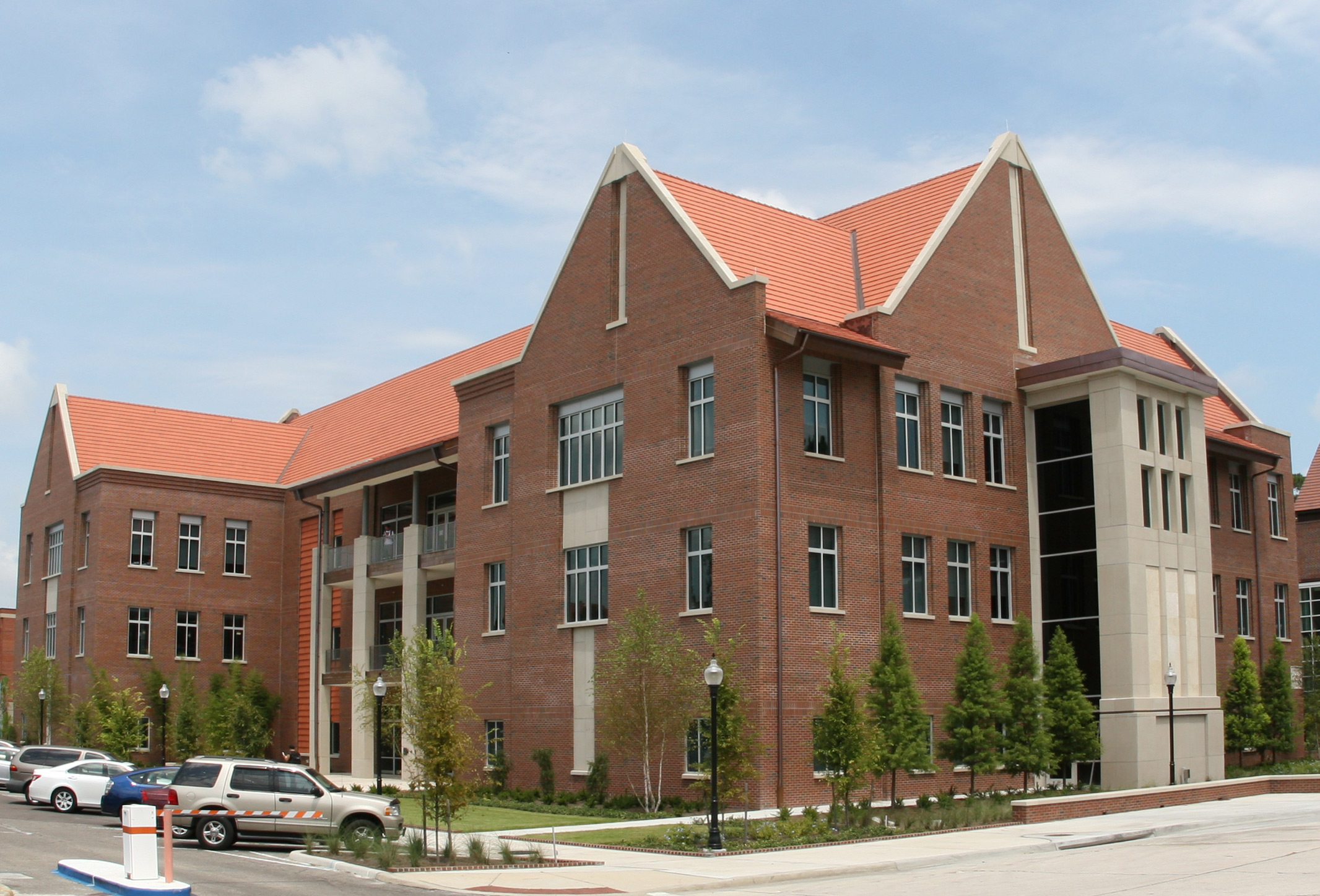
Hough Hall in the Warrington College of Business at the University of Florida.
