= Alfred C. Warrington =

American accountant and business executive

- Born: 1935; Upper Darby Township, Pennsylvania, U.S.
- Died: May 20, 2020 (aged 84–85)
- Education: B.S., University of Florida, 1958
- Known for: Benefactor and namesake of the Warrington College of Business

Alfred Coard "Al" Warrington, IV (born 1935) is a former American accountant and business executive. Warrington was a managing partner of Arthur Andersen and the co-founder of Sanifill, Inc., a company which ultimately merged to create the new Waste Management, Inc. Warrington is an alumnus and significant benefactor of the University of Florida, and has held various positions in the governance of the university and its related organizations.

Warrington was born in Upper Darby Township, Pennsylvania. He attended the University of Florida in Gainesville, Florida, and earned his bachelor's degree in accounting from the university's College of Business Administration in 1958. He was a member of the Chi Phi Fraternity (Theta Delta Chapter) while he was an undergraduate student.

Warrington was founding chairman and co-chief executive officer of Sanifill, Inc., an environmental company based in Houston, Texas, which developed and operated nonhazardous solid waste landfills and land farms. He created a $12 million endowment of the College of Business in 1996, and the college's name was changed to the "Warrington College of Business." In 2009, Warrington announced that he would make another donation of $16 million, eligible for matching funds from the state, to endow four new professorships within the College of Business.

Warrington is a past president of the University of Florida Alumni Association, Gator Boosters, Inc., and the Bluebonnet Bowl Committee. He has served as a member the university's board of trustees since the board was created in 2001.

The University of Florida named Warrington as a Distinguished Alumnus in 1979, and its Fisher School of Accounting honored him as an Outstanding Alumnus in 1985. In recognition of his past service to the university's Florida Gators sports programs, Warrington was inducted into the University of Florida Athletic Hall of Fame as an "Honorary Letter Winner" in 2003. He is also a member of the Florida Blue Key leadership honorary society.

In 2014, he pledged $75 million for the University of Florida.

Warrington resided in Houston, Texas. He died on May 20, 2020.

== See also ==
- History of the University of Florida
- List of Chi Phi brothers
- List of University of Florida alumni
- List of University of Florida Athletic Hall of Fame members
