= List of Chi Phi members =

The list of Chi Phi brothers includes initiated members of Chi Phi. Notable members are listed by name and chapter.

== Academia ==
- Ibrahim (Abe) Baggili - CSE Division Chair at LSU, Digital Forensics Scientist and Academic Administrator, Graduate Advisor of Kappa Zeta Chapter - Purdue University
- Archibald Alexander - president of Hampden-Sydney College - Princeton University 1824
- David Crenshaw Barrow, Jr. - chancellor of the University of Georgia 1906 to 1925 - University of Georgia 1874
- Harmon White Caldwell - president of the University of Georgia 1935 to 1948 and Chancellor of the University System of Georgia 1948 to 1964 - University of Georgia 1919
- James Edward Dickey - president of Emory University 1902 to 1915 and Methodist Bishop - Emory University 1891
- William Preston Few - president of Duke University 1910 to 1940 - Wofford College 1889
- Walter B. Hill - chancellor of the University of Georgia 1899 to 1905 - University of Georgia 1870
- Robert Stewart Hyer - first president of Southern Methodist University 1911 to 1920 - Emory University 1881
- Sidney Edward Mezes - president of University of Texas at Austin 1908 to 1914 and City College of New York 1914 to 1927 - University of California 1884
- Dr. Henry N. Snyder - president of Wofford College 1902 to 1942 - Vanderbilt University 1887
- Edwin Erle Sparks - president of Pennsylvania State University 1908 to 1920 and namesake of Chi Phi's Sparks Memorial Medal Ohio Wesleyan University, Ohio State University 1884
- W. Allen Wallis - president, 1962 to 1970, and chancellor, 1970 to 1982 of the University of Rochester - University of Minnesota 1932
- John C. Weaver - president of University of Wisconsin System 1971 to 1977 - University of Wisconsin–Madison 1936
- George T. Winston - president of University of North Carolina at Chapel Hill 1891 to 1896, University of Texas at Austin 1896 to 1899, and North Carolina State University 1899 to 1908 - University of North Carolina at Chapel Hill 1870
- P.K. Yonge - chairman of the Florida Board of Control 1909 to 1917 - University of Georgia 1871

== Business ==
- William W. Atterbury - World War I general and president of Pennsylvania Railroad 1925 to 1935 - Yale University 1886
- Eugene R. Black - president of Atlanta Trust Co. Bank and Chairman of the Federal Reserve 1933 to 1934 - University of Georgia 1892
- Eugene R. Black, Sr. - president of the World Bank 1949 to 1963 - University of Georgia 1917
- John Lyon Collyer - president and chairman of B.F. Goodrich 1939 to 1960 - Cornell University 1917Warren Grice Elliott - president of Atlantic Coast Line Railroad 1902 to 1906 - University of North Carolina at Chapel Hill 1867
- Samuel Morse Felton, Jr. - World War I general and president of Chicago Great Western Railroad 1909 to 1929 - MIT 1873
- Richard G. Newman - chairman of AECOM Technology Corporation - Bucknell University 1956
- Herman C. Krannert - founder, chairman, and CEO of Inland Container Corporation 1925 to 1970 - University of Illinois 1912
- James D. Robinson III - CEO of American Express 1977 to 1993 - Georgia Institute of Technology 1957
- Alfred C. Warrington - founding chairman and co-CEO of Sanifill, Inc. - University of Florida 1958

== Engineering and science ==
- George Washington Gale Ferris Jr. - inventor of the Ferris wheel - Rensselaer Polytechnic Institute 1881
- T. Keith Glennan - first director of NASA 1958 to 1961 - Yale University 1927
- Brewster Kahle - inventor of WAIS and founder of the Internet Archive - Massachusetts Institute of Technology (MIT) 1982
- Charles Greely Loring (architect) - Boston-based architect - Harvard 1903, MIT 1906
- Frank and Kenneth Osborn - stadium architects and engineers that designed Fenway Park, Yankee Stadium, and Tiger Stadium as well as college facilities for Michigan, Purdue, West Point, and Notre Dame - Rensselaer Polytechnic Institute 1880 & 1908
- Jesse W. Reno - inventor of the escalator - Lehigh University 1883

== Entertainment ==
- Dan Bakkedahl - improvisor, actor, and teacher - Florida State University 1992
- Andy Brick - composer, conductor, symphonist, and professor - University of Michigan 1987
- Walter Cronkite - anchorman of CBS News 1962 to 1981, namesake of Chi Phi's Walter Cronkite Congressional Award - University of Texas at Austin 1937
- Henry W. Grady - journalist, orator, and spokesman for the New South - University of Georgia 1868
- Chris Hardwick - host, actor, television personality, and comedian - University of California-Los Angeles 1993
- Billy Lane - author, television personality, and owner of Choppers, Inc. - Florida State University 1992
- Mark Ordesky - executive producer of The Lord of the Rings film trilogy - University of Southern California 1985
- Matt Vasgersian - MLB network studio host, sportscaster and former play-by-play announcer for the San Diego Padres - University of Southern California 1989
- Matt Oberg - Actor University of Michigan 1998

== Law ==
- Harrie Brigham Chase - associate justice, Supreme Court of Vermont - Dartmouth College 1912
- Parker Lee McDonald - chief justice, Supreme Court of Florida 1986 to 1988 - University of Florida 1950
- Peter Meldrim - president of the American Bar Association - University of Georgia 1868
- Hugh L. Nichols - chief justice, Supreme Court of Ohio 1913 to 1920, see State Governors & Lt. Governors
- William Hayes Pope - chief justice, Territorial Court of New Mexico 1910 to 1912 - University of Georgia 1889
- William A. Schnader - Pennsylvania Attorney General 1930 to 1935 - Franklin & Marshall College 1904

== Military ==
- Julian Alford, USMC - commanding general of Marine Corps Training Command
- William W. Atterbury, USA - director general of transportation and World War I veteran also see Business
- Robert Courtney Davis, USA - adjutant general of the Army 1922 to 1927 - World War I Veteran - Franklin & Marshall College 1897
- Samuel McGowan, USN - paymaster general 1914 to 1920 - Wofford College 1889

== Politics ==
=== U.S. senators ===
- Hiram W. Johnson - U.S. Senator, California 1917 to 1945, see State Governors & Lt. Governors
- Richard R. Kenney - U.S. Senator, Delaware 1895 to 1900 - Hobart College 1878
- Lee Slater Overman - U.S. Senator, North Carolina 1903 to 1930 - Duke University 1874
- LeRoy Percy - U.S. Senator, Mississippi 1909 to 1912 - University of Virginia 1881
- Charles S. Robb - U.S. Senator, Virginia 1989 to 2001, see State Governors & Lt. Governors
- William B. Saxbe - U.S. Senator, Ohio 1969 to 1974; U.S. Attorney General 1974 to 1975; Ambassador to India 1975 to 1977 - Ohio State University 1940

=== U.S. representatives ===
- Henry Alexander Baldwin - U.S. Congressman, Hawaii 1921 to 1923 - MIT 1894
- Clay Stone Briggs - U.S. Congressman, Texas 1919 to 1933 - University of Texas at Austin
- Randolph Carpenter - U.S. Congressman, Kansas 1933 to 1937 - University of Michigan 1917
- Jackson B. Chase - U.S. Congressman, Nebraska 1955 to 1957 - University of Nebraska 1912
- George B. Churchill - U.S. Congressman, Massachusetts 1925 - Amherst College 1889
- J. Edwin Ellerbe - U.S. Congressman, South Carolina 1905 to 1913 - Wofford College 1887
- Arthur Granville Dewalt - U.S. Congressman, Pennsylvania 1915 to 1921 - Lafayette College 1874
- Marcus C.L. Kline - U.S. Congressman, Pennsylvania 1903 to 1907 - Muhlenberg College 1874
- William Edwin Minshall, Jr. - U.S. Congressman, Ohio 1955 to 1974 - University of Virginia 1936
- R. Walton Moore - U.S. Congressman, Virginia 1919 to 1931, Asst. Sec. of State 1933 to 1941 - University of Virginia the 1877
- William T. Pheiffer - U.S. Congressman, New York 1941 to 1943 and Ambassador to Dominican Republic 1953 to 1957 - University of Southern California 1919
- Thomas Wharton Phillips, Jr. - U.S. Congressman, Pennsylvania 1923 to 1926 - Yale University 1897
- William R. Ratchford - U.S. Congressman, Connecticut 1979 to 1985 - University of Connecticut 1956
- John Humphrey Small - U.S. Congressman, North Carolina 1899 to 1920 - Duke University 1876
- Emory Speer - U.S. Congressman, Georgia 1879 to 1883 - University of Georgia 1869
- William Shearer Stenger - U.S. Congressman, Pennsylvania 1875 to 1879 - Franklin & Marshall 1858
- Henry Stockbridge, Jr. - U.S. Congressman, Maryland 1889 to 1891 - Amherst College 1877
- William L. Terry - U.S. Congressman, Arkansas 1891 to 1901 - Duke University 1872
- Vernon W. Thomson - U.S. Congressman, Wisconsin 1961 to 1974, see State Governors & Lt. Governors

=== Federal appointees ===
- Dan Amstutz - Ambassador-at-large for Agricultural and Trade Development - Ohio State University 1954
- Miles Copeland Jr., Central Intelligence Agency (CIA) founder, University of Alabama
- Hugh S. Cumming - U.S. Surgeon General 1920 to 1936 - University of Virginia 1891
- Franklin Knight Lane - Secretary of the Interior 1913 to 1920 - University of California 1886
- Lyle Franklin Lane - principal officer of U.S. Interests, Cuba 1977 to 1979; U.S. Ambassador to Uruguay 1979 to 1980, and U.S. Ambassador to Paraguay 1980 to 1982 - University of Washington 1950
- R. Walton Moore - U.S. Assistant Secretary of State 1933 to 1941, see U.S. Congressmen
- William T. Pheiffer - U.S. Ambassador to Dominican Republic 1953 to 1957, see U.S. Congressmen
- William Barret Ridgely - U.S. Comptroller of the Currency 1901 to 1908 - Rensselaer Polytechnic Institute 1879
- Wilbur Ross - United States Secretary of Commerce - Yale University 1959
- William B. Saxbe - U.S. Attorney General 1974 to 1975, see U.S. Senators
- Thomas F. Stroock - U.S. Ambassador to Guatemala 1989 to 1992 - Yale University 1948

=== State governors and lieutenant governors ===
- Dolph Briscoe - Governor of Texas 1973 to 1979 - University of Texas at Austin 1942
- Joseph Mackey Brown - Governor of Georgia 1909 to 1911 and 1912 to 1914 - Oglethorpe University 1872
- Nathaniel E. Harris - Governor of Georgia 1915 to 1917 - University of Georgia 1870
- William D. Jelks - Governor of Alabama 1900 to 1907 - Mercer University 1876
- Hiram W. Johnson - Governor of California 1911 to 1917; U.S. Senator, California 1917 to 1945 - University of California 1888
- Hugh L. Nichols - Lt. Governor of Ohio 1911 to 1913 and Chief Justice, Supreme Court of Ohio 1913 to 1920 - Ohio Wesleyan University 1888
- Charles S. Robb - Lt. Governor of Virginia 1978 to 1982; Governor of Virginia 1982 to 1986; U.S. Senator, Virginia 1989 to 2001 - Cornell University, University of Wisconsin–Madison 1961
- Carl Sanders - Governor of Georgia 1963 to 1967 - University of Georgia 1945
- John Marshall Slaton - Governor of Georgia 1911 to 1912 and 1914 to 1915 - University of Georgia 1886
- Lewis H. Sweetser - Lt. Governor, Idaho 1909 to 1913 - University of California 1889
- Vernon W. Thomson - Governor of Wisconsin 1957 to 1959; U.S. Congressman, Wisconsin 1961 to 1974 - University of Wisconsin–Madison
- Wilfred D. Turner - Lt. Governor of North Carolina 1901 to 1905 - Duke University 1876

=== State politicians ===
- Jeremy Cooney - New York State Senate District 56 - Hobart College
- John Giannetti Jr. - Maryland Senate District 21 2003 to 2007 - Bucknell University 1986
- Ernest Alfonso Gray (born 1878), American politician from Virginia
- William Washington Vance - Senator for Bienville, Bossier, Claiborne, and Webster parishes in Louisiana, 1886 to 1892
- Chris Walters - West Virginia Senate District 08 2012 to present - West Virginia University 2010
- Steven Rhoads - New York State Senate - District 5 - 2023–present - State University of New York at Albany

=== Mayors ===
- Eugene Herbert Clay - mayor of Marietta, Georgia 1910 to 1911 - University of Georgia 1903
- Bob McWhorter - mayor of Athens, Georgia 1940 to 1946 - See College Football Hall of Fame
- Peter Meldrim - mayor of Savannah, Georgia 1897 to 1899 - See American Bar Association
- John Humphrey Small - mayor of Washington, North Carolina 1889 to 1890 - See U.S. Congressman
- Vernon W. Thomson - mayor of Richland Center, Wisconsin 1944 to 1951- See State Governors
- BGEN Samuel Morse Felton, Jr., USA - director general of military railways and World War I Veteran also see Business

== Sports ==
=== Baseball ===
- Chuck Cary - Major League Baseball pitcher who played from 1985 to 1993 for Detroit Tigers, New York Yankees, and St. Louis Cardinals - University of California 1981

the * Lawrence "Crash" Davis - Major League Baseball player and real-life "Crash" Davis of Bull Durham movie - Duke University 1940

=== Football ===
- Warren Alfson - two-time All American and NFL OL - University of Nebraska 1941
- Taz Anderson - seven-year NFL tight end (St. Louis & Atlanta) and 1961 NFL Rookie of the Year - Georgia Institute of Technology 1961
- Earle Bruce - head football coach of Ohio State University and member of the College Football Hall All-American - Ohio State University 1953
- Bobby Davis - two-time All American, member of the College Football Hall of Fame, and NFL OL - Georgia Institute of Technology 1948
- Bucky Dilts - three year NAll-AmericanAll-SECity of Georgia 1977
- Paul Duke - All American, All SEC, and NFL OL - Georgia Institute of Technology 1946
- Jon Gruden - Strength and Conditioning Assistant of Las Vegas Raiders - Lafayette College 2016
- Bill Hartman - All-American, All-SEC RB, and Football Hall of Fame - University of Georgia 1938
- Bob McWhorter - All American, four-time All SEC DB, and member of the College Football Hall of Fame - University of Georgia 1914
- Edward Mylin - college coach and member of the College Football Hall of Fame - Franklin & Marshall College 1916
- Tommy O'Connell - All-American quarterback and NFL leading passer 1957 - University of Illinois 1953
- Bill Roper - head football coach for Princeton University and member of the College Football Hall of Fame - Lehigh University 1902
- Ross Scheuerman - NFL free agent running back - Lafayette College 2015
- Frank "Dutch" Schwab - two-time All-American DG and member of the College Hall of Fame - Lafayette College 1923
- Rankin M. Smith Sr. - owner of Atlanta Falcons 1965 to 2001 - University of Georgia 1946

=== Olympians ===
- Greg Barton - double Gold Medalist, 1988 Olympics in Kayaking (K1 & K2 1000 meters) and four-time world champion - University of Michigan 1983
- Adolph Kiefer - Gold Medalist in 100M backstroke in the 1936 Olympics - University of Texas 1940

=== Other sports ===
- Griff Aldrich - head basketball coach of Longwood University - Hampden-Sydney College 1996
- Dan Magill - Hall of Fame tennis coach at the University of Georgia from 1954 to 1988 - University of Georgia 1946
