= John Kraft =

John Kraft may refer to:

- Jack Kraft (John J. Kraft, 1921–2014), basketball coach
- John Kraft (academic), current dean of the Warrington College of Business Administration at the University of Florida
- John Kraft, drummer with Smut Peddlers
