= Bryan Hall (Gainesville, Florida) =

- U.S. National Register of Historic Places
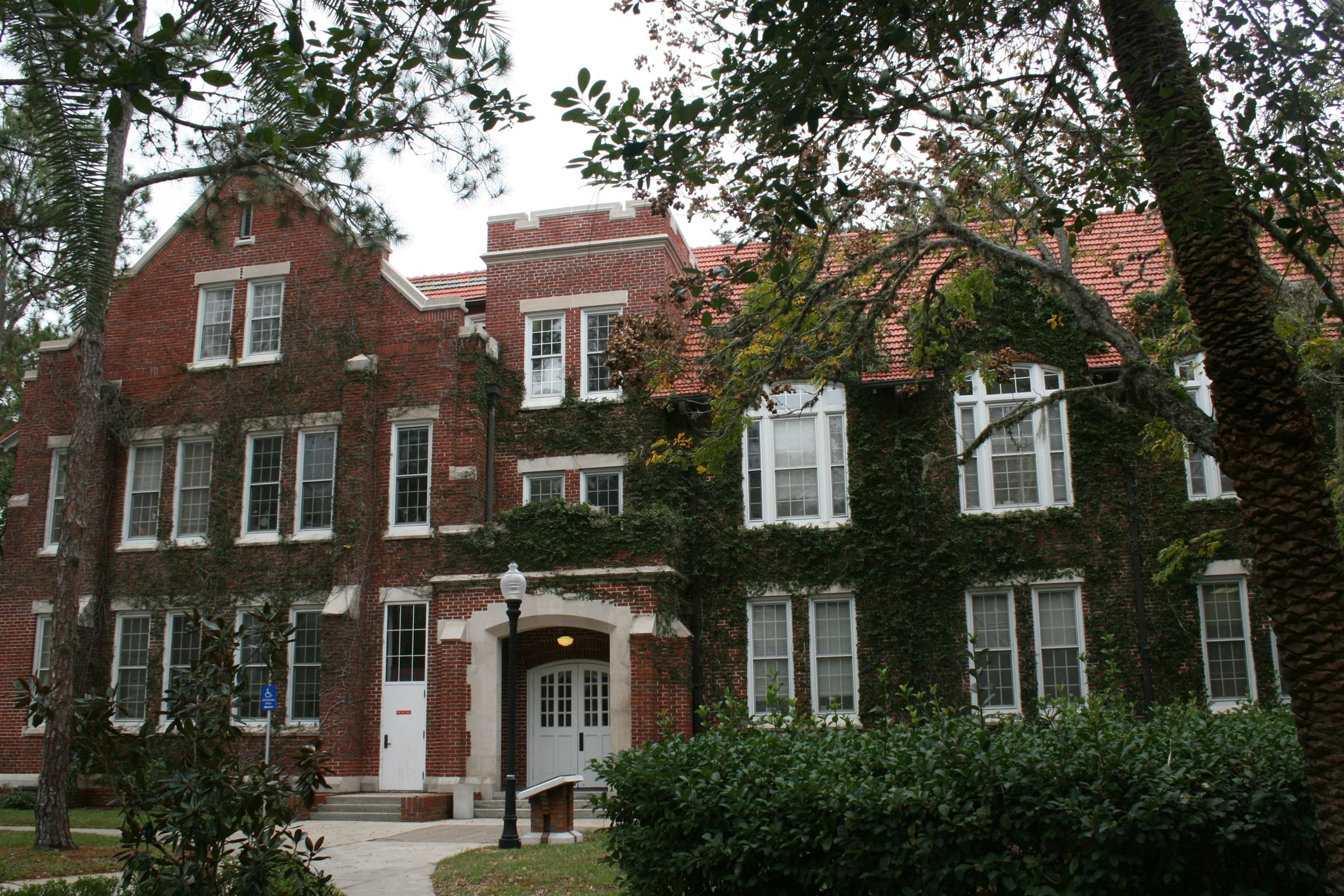

- Location within Florida Location within the United States
- Location: Gainesville, Florida
- Coordinates: 29°39′4″N 82°20′26″W
- Built: 1914
- Architect: William Augustus Edwards of Edwards & Saywards;
- Architectural style: Collegiate Gothic,
- NRHP reference No.: 79000653
- Added to NRHP: 27 June 1979

Bryan Hall is a historic building in Gainesville, Florida, United States. It is in the northeastern section of the University of Florida in Gainesville. On June 27, 1979, it was added to the U.S. National Register of Historic Places. Bryan Hall is part of the Warrington College of Business. The building also was home to the College of Law from 1914 to 1969.

== Namesake ==
Bryan Hall is named for Nathan Philemon Bryan, an attorney, U.S. Senator, and judge who successfully fought for the establishment of a law school at the University of Florida while serving as chairman of the State Board of Control.

== See also ==
- University of Florida
- Buildings at the University of Florida
- Warrington College of Business
- Campus Historic District
