= William R. Hough =

American investment banker

- Born: 1927; Fort Myers, Florida
- Died: 2020 (aged 92–93)
- Education: University of Florida
- Known for: Benefactor of the Warrington College of Business at the University of Florida
- Spouse: Hazel Hough

William R. Hough (1927–2020) was an American investment banker known for being a benefactor of the University of Florida. He was the founder of William R. Hough and Company of St. Petersburg, Florida.

Hough received his Master of Business Administration from the University of Florida (UF) in 1948. Hough was a member of Delta-Delta chapter of Kappa Sigma fraternity. Hough gave $30 million to the graduate business programs at the Warrington College of Business at UF.
