= List of Chi Phi chapters =

Chi Phi is a collegiate social fraternity. The modern men's collegiate fraternity, Chi Phi's United Order formed from the merger of several previous organizations that had formed independently but were each known as Chi Phi. The first fraternity was established at Princeton University in 1824. As further explained in the main article, Chi Phi came from the following branches:

1. Chi Phi Society – December 24, 1824 to 1825
2. Princeton Order – 1854 to 1867
3. Southern Order – August 21, 1858 to 1874
4. Hobart Order – November 14, 1860 to 1867
5. Northern Order – May 29, 1867 to 1874, combining the Princeton and Hobart Orders
6. United Order – March 27, 1874, to present, formed by the merger of the Northern and Southern Orders.

In the following list of Chi Phi chapters, active chapters are indicated in bold and inactive chapters and institutions are shown in italics.

Chapter	Branch	Charter date and range	Institution	Location	Status	Ref.
Princeton Society (see Princeton)	Chi Phi	December 24, 1824 – 1825	College of New Jersey (now Princeton University)	Princeton, New Jersey	Inactive	
Princeton (see Princeton Society and Sigma First)	Princeton	1854–1860	College of New Jersey (now Princeton University)	Princeton, New Jersey	Inactive	
**Zeta (First)**	Princeton, United	December 1, 1854 – April 29, 2019; October 2023	Franklin & Marshall College	Lancaster, Pennsylvania	Active	(Note: The college suspended the chapter for five years in 2019 for hazing.)
**Alpha-Alpha**	Southern, United	August 21, 1858 – 1868; 1924	University of North Carolina at Chapel Hill	Chapel Hill, North Carolina	Active	(Note: Revived in 1924 by absorbing Gamma Phi, established in 1920.)
Beta (First)	Southern	November 12, 1858 – 1861	Centenary College	Shreveport, Louisiana	Inactive	(Note: Chapter closed due to the American Civil War.)
**Alpha**	Southern, United	May 1, 1859	University of Virginia	Charlottesville, Virginia	Active	
Gamma (First)	Southern	December 24, 1859 – 1867	Davidson College	Davidson, North Carolina	Inactive	
**Upsilon**	Hobart, United	November 14, 1860 – 1880; 1987	Hobart and William Smith Colleges	Geneva, New York	Active	
Epsilon (First)	Southern	December 24, 1860 – 1861	Western Military Institute	Nashville, Tennessee	Inactive, Reassigned	
Zeta (Second)	Southern	December 24, 1861 – 1862	Cumberland University	Lebanon, Tennessee	Inactive	
Psi (First)	Hobart	December 24, 1860 – 1866	Kenyon College	Gambier, Ohio	Inactive	
Sigma (First) (see Princeton and Alpha Sigma)	Princeton, Northern	December 24, 1864 – 1868	Princeton University	Princeton, New Jersey	Inactive	
**Epsilon (Second)**	Southern, United	March 2, 1867 – 2008; 2013	Hampden–Sydney College	Hampden Sydney, Virginia	Active	
**Delta**	Hobart, United	March 19, 1867 – 1979; 1881–1993; 1996–1999; 2016	Rutgers University	New Brunswick, New Jersey	Active	(Note: Reformed in 1996 by absorbing Rho Sigma Tau (local), established in the 1960s.)
**Eta**	Southern, United	April 16, 1867 – 1874; 1878	University of Georgia	Athens, Georgia	Active	
Theta (First)	Southern	December 24, 1867 – 1870	University of Edinburgh	Edinburgh, Scotland	Inactive	
Theta (Second)	Princeton	December 24, 1867 – 1872	Gettysburg College	Gettysburg, Pennsylvania	Inactive	
Xi	Northern, United	October 13, 1868 – 1881; 1888 – 2024	Cornell University	Ithaca, New York	Inactive	(Note: Originally part of the United Order.) (Note: Chapter was suspended after a charge related to sexual assault and drugs.)
Beta (Second)	Northern, United	December 24, 1868 – 1885	Muhlenberg College	Allentown, Pennsylvania	Inactive, Reassigned	
Gamma (Second)	Southern, United	March 19, 1869 – 1993; 199x ?–2009; 201x ? – April 21, 2015	Emory University	Atlanta, Georgia	Inactive	
Omega (First)	Northern, United	December 24, 1869 – 1893	Dickinson College	Carlisle, Pennsylvania	Inactive	
Iota (First)	Southern	December 24, 1869 – 1880	Mercer University	Macon, Georgia	Inactive	
Alpha-Mu	Southern, United	December 24, 1871 – 1879; 1940–1942; 1948–1964	Duke University	Durham, North Carolina	Inactive	
Lambda (First) (see **Rho Delta**)	Southern	December 24, 1871 – 1872	Oglethorpe University	Brookhaven, Georgia	Inactive, Reestablished	(Note: Re-established in 1969 as Rho Delta chapter.)
Sigma (Second)	Northern, United	December 24, 1871 – 1907	Wofford College	Spartanburg, South Carolina	Inactive, Reassigned	
Nu (First)	Northern	February 15, 1872 – 1878	Washington & Lee University	Lexington, Virginia	Inactive, Reassigned	(Note: Formed by absorbing Alpha Gamma (local), established in the 1860s.)
**Psi (Second)**	Northern, United	February 22, 1872	Lehigh University	Bethlehem, Pennsylvania	Active	
Pi (First)	Southern	December 24, 1872 – 1883	Kentucky Military Institute	Lyndon, Kentucky	Inactive	
Kappa (First)	Northern, United	December 24, 1872 – 1895	Brown University	Providence, Rhode Island	Inactive, Reassigned	(Note: Formed by absorbing Xi Beta Phi (local).) (Note: Chapter's charter revoked. Became the Beta Nu chapter of Sigma Chi in 1914.)
**Beta (Third)**	Northern, United	May 27, 1873 – 1878; 1890	Massachusetts Institute of Technology	Cambridge, Massachusetts	Active	(Note: Revived in 1890 by absorbing the Navajo Club (local), established in 1889.) (Note: It appears that this chapter's name was briefly reassigned to a nearby Harvard group, which lasted for two years while the MIT chapter was dormant.)
**Alpha-Chi**	Northern, United	November 6, 1873 – 1895; 1911–1970, 1975; 20xx ?	Ohio Wesleyan University	Delaware, Ohio	Active	(Note: This chapter was formed by absorbing the Beta chapter of a four-chapter regional fraternity named Alpha Digamma , established in 1864. It had been expelled from that order in 1868 "because of the disgraceful conduct of some of its members." (Baird's Manual, 1st Ed), and joined the Northern Order of Chi Phi five years after leaving Alpha Digamma. The chapter was re-established in 1911 by absorbing Delta Rho Tau (local), established in 1910. It was reformed as a colony in 1973 and 2017.)
Omicron (First)	Southern	December 24, 1873 – 1874	St. Johns' College	Little Rock, Arkansas	Inactive	
Phi	Northern, United	December 24, 1873 – 1980	Amherst College	Amherst, Massachusetts	Inactive	
**Rho**	United	January 30, 1874 – 2005; 201x ?	Lafayette College	Easton, Pennsylvania	Active	(Note: Formed by absorbing Iota Alpha Kappa (local), established in 1863.)
**Lambda (Second)**	United	February 11, 1875 – 1970; 1973–2009; 2012–20xx; 2026-present ?	University of California, Berkeley	Berkeley, California	Active	
Omicron (aka York Hall)	United	December 24, 1877 – 1959	Yale University	New Haven, Connecticut	Inactive	(Note: The chapter was also called York Hall, a tradition at Yale for calling fraternities after their buildings.)
**Theta (Third)**	United	May 25, 1878 – 1987; 1999	Rensselaer Polytechnic Institute	Troy, New York	Active	
Alpha-Tau	United	January 1, 1882 – 1885; 1921–2020	University of Michigan	Ann Arbor, Michigan	Inactive; Returning as Associate Chapter in 2027	(Note: Reformed in 1921 by absorbing the Monks (local), established in 1910.)
**Mu**	United	October 18, 1883	Stevens Institute of Technology	Hoboken, New Jersey	Active	
Iota (Second)	United	November 9, 1883 – 2008; 2014 – July 20, 2020	Ohio State University	Columbus, Ohio	Inactive	
Nu (Second)	United	December 24, 1883 – 1885	University of Pennsylvania	Philadelphia, Pennsylvania	Inactive, Reassigned	
Pi (Second) (see Alpha-Pi First)	United	December 24, 1883 – 1899	Vanderbilt University	Nashville, Tennessee	Inactive, Reassigned	(Note: Reformed in 1924, as Alpha-Pi chapter by absorbing Omicron Alpha Pi (local), established in 1922.)
Beta (Fourth)	United	December 24, 1885 – 1887	Harvard University	Cambridge, Massachusetts	Inactive, Reassigned	
Tau (First)	United	December 24, 1889 – 1897	University of South Carolina	Columbia, South Carolina	Inactive, Reassigned	
**Nu (Third)**	United	March 10, 1892 – 1972; 1985–201x ?; 20xx ?	University of Texas at Austin	Austin, Texas	Active	
Chi	United	December 24, 1902 – 1968; 1980–1987	Dartmouth College	Hanover, New Hampshire	Inactive	(Note: Formed by absorbing Alpha Alpha Omega (local), established in 1897. Chapter disassociated and became the local fraternity "Chi Phi Heorot" in 1968. Chi Phi Heorot rejoined the fraternity in 1980. However, in the winter of 1985, the chapter tried to turn the central hall on the first floor of the house into an ice hockey rink by flooding it and opening the doors to allow Hanover's subzero winter temperatures to freeze the water. This caused the floor to fall through into the basement. When the national fraternity refused to help pay for the needed repairs, the chapter withdrew and again became a local fraternity, this time under the name Chi Heorot (1985).)
**Omega (Second)**	United	June 2, 1904 – 2002; 200x ?	Georgia Tech	Atlanta, Georgia	Active	
Sigma (Third)	United	April 27, 1912 – 1986	University of Illinois Urbana-Champaign	Champaign, Illinois	Inactive	(Note: Formed by absorbing the Ibis Club (local), established in 1910.)
**Kappa (Second)**	United	March 11, 1916 – 1970; 1980–2007; 201x ? – March 27, 2015; 201x -	University of Wisconsin–Madison	Madison, Wisconsin	Associate Chapter	(Note: Formed by absorbing Red Triangle (local), established in 1911.) (Note: Chapter banned from campus for hazing.)
**Tau (Second)**	United	April 20, 1920 – 2007; 2012	University of Alabama	Tuscaloosa, Alabama	Active	
**Alpha-Pi (Second)**	United	December 24, 1922 – 1936; 1970–1974; 2018	Iowa State University	Ames, Iowa	Active	(Note: Formed by absorbing Lambda Tau Alpha (local), established in 1908.)
**Alpha Delta**	United	May 9, 1924 – 2009; 2015	Pennsylvania State University	University Park, Pennsylvania	Active	(Note: Formed by absorbing Alpha Delta Sigma (local), established in 1911.)
Alpha-Pi (First) (see Pi Second and Chi Chi Chi)	United	1924–1942	Vanderbilt University	Nashville, Tennessee	Inactive, Reassigned	(Note: Reestablishment of the Pi (Second) chapter. Later reestablished as Chi Chi Chi.)
Beta Delta	United	December 24, 1925 – 1959	University of Washington	Seattle, Washington	Inactive	(Note: Formed by absorbing Delta Sigma (local), established in 1920.)
Gamma Delta	United	April 29, 1928 – 1990	University of Minnesota	Minneapolis, Minnesota	Inactive	(Note: Formed by absorbing Chi Delta Xi (local), established in 1911.)
Epsilon Delta	United	March 17, 1931 – June 19, 2015	Oregon State University	Corvallis, Oregon	Inactive	(Note: Formed by absorbing Tau Delta (local), established in 1919.)
Delta Delta	United	March 28, 1931 – 1949; 1952–1958; 1989–1992	University of California, Los Angeles	Los Angeles, California	Inactive	(Note: Formed by absorbing the Chi Phi Club (local), established in 1927.)
**Alpha Theta Chi**	United	November 26, 1932 – 1942; 1964	University of Nebraska–Lincoln	Lincoln, Nebraska	Active	(Note: Formed by absorbing Alpha Theta Chi (local), established in 1895.)
**Eta Delta**	United	April 6, 1934 – 1999; 2016	University of Southern California	Los Angeles, California	Active	(Note: Formed by absorbing Theta Psi (local) and Sigma Tau (local), established in 1897.)
**Theta Delta**	United	February 15, 1935 – 1998; 2000–2002; 2007	University of Florida	Gainesville, Florida	Active	(Note: Formed by absorbing Alpha Delta (local), established in 1923.)
Pi (Third)	United	February 1, 1952 – 2010	Northwestern University	Evanston, Illinois	Inactive	(Note: Formed by absorbing the Clakett Club (local), established in 1949.)
Zeta Delta	United	February 25, 1956 – 1969; 1985–2005	University of Connecticut	Storrs, Connecticut	Inactive	(Note: Formed by absorbing Beta Epsilon Rho (local), established in 1950.)
Iota Delta	United	November 15, 1958 – 2008; 20xx - December 19, 2025	Indiana University Bloomington	Bloomington, Indiana	Inactive	(Note: Formed by absorbing the Clakett Club (local), established in 1957.)
Rho Iota Kappa	United	February 3, 1962 – 200x ?; 2010 – December 15, 2015	University of Rhode Island	Kingston, Rhode Island	Inactive	(Note: Chapter formed from Rho Iota Kappa (local), established in 1908. The chapter was suspended for four years in 2019 for numerous violations of the university's substance abuse policy.)
Tau Delta	United	December 24, 1962 – 1970	University of Oregon	Eugene, Oregon	Inactive	
**Delta Xi**	United	May 1, 1965 – July 15, 2015; 2018	West Virginia Wesleyan College	Buckhannon, West Virginia	Active	(Note: Formed by absorbing Delta Xi (local). established in 1961.)
**Kappa Delta**	United	February 5, 1966 – 1971; 1990	University of Rochester	Rochester, New York	Active	(Note: Formed by absorbing Gamma Sigma Phi (local) established in 1962.)
Lambda Delta	United	May 14, 1966 – 1970; 199x ?–20xx ?	University of Arizona	Tucson, Arizona	Inactive	
**Mu Delta**	United	October 21, 1967 – 1979; 1983	Auburn University	Auburn, Alabama	Active	
**Nu Delta**	United	February 10, 1968 – 2018; 2022	Florida State University	Tallahassee, Florida	Active	
**Xi Delta**	United	December 7, 1968	Florida Institute of Technology	Melbourne, Florida	Active	(Note: Formed by absorbing Alpha Chi Lambda, established in 1966.)
**Rho Delta** (see Lambda)	United	May 3, 1969	Oglethorpe University	Brookhaven, Georgia	Active	(Note: Formed by absorbing the Clackett Club (local), established in 1968.)
Sigma Delta	United	May 31, 1969	University of California, Davis	Davis, California	Inactive	
Omega Delta	United	September 20, 1969 – 1976	Morehead State University	Morehead, Kentucky	Inactive	(Note: Formed by absorbing Delta Gamma Phi (local), established in 1966.)
Phi Delta	United	November 22, 1969 – 2000; 2010 – March 29, 2021	University of Tennessee	Knoxville, Tennessee	Inactive	
Omicron Delta	United	December 24, 1969 – 1988	Miami University	Oxford, Ohio	Inactive	
Upsilon Delta	United		Tulane University	New Orleans, Louisiana	Never chartered	(Note: Formed from Kappa Phi (local). This chapter was named and operated from December 24, 1969 to 1969, but was never chartered.)
Pi Delta	United	December 24, 1969 – 1973; 1983–1985	West Virginia University	Morgantown, West Virginia	Inactive	
Chi Delta	United	January 31, 1970 – 1987	Georgia State University	Atlanta, Georgia	Inactive	(Note: Formed by absorbing the Clakett Club (local), established in 1968.)
**Psi Delta**	United	December 12, 1970 – August 18, 2014; 20xx ?	University of North Carolina Charlotte	Charlotte, North Carolina	Active	(Note: Formed by absorbing Zeta Chi (local), established in 1969.)
**Alpha Zeta**	United	May 19, 1973	University of West Georgia	Carrollton, Georgia	Active	(Note: Formed by absorbing Chi Phi Club (local), established in 1971)
Beta Zeta	United	December 24, 1974 – 1984	University of Central Florida	Orlando, Florida	Inactive	
**Gamma Zeta**	United	April 28, 1979 – 2005; 2016	University of North Carolina Wilmington	Wilmington, North Carolina	Active	(Note: Formed by absorbing Un Kappa Fifth, established in 1957.)
Delta Zeta	United	April 16, 1983 – November 27, 2017	University of South Florida	Tampa, Florida	Inactive	
**Phi Lambda Theta**	United	May 5, 1984	Bucknell University	Lewisburg, Pennsylvania	Active	(Note: Formed by absorbing Phi Lambda Theta (local), established in 1946.)
Chi Chi Chi (see Alpha-Pi)	United		Vanderbilt University	Nashville, Tennessee	Never chartered	(Note: Chapter was established and named on December 24, 1986, but was never chartered. Instead, it withdrew and joined Lambda Chi Alpha in 1991.)
Alpha-Sigma (see Sigma First)	United	February 28, 1987 – 2012	Princeton University	Princeton, New Jersey	Inactive	
Theta Zeta	United	March 27, 1987 – December 31, 2018	Texas A&M University	College Station, Texas	Inactive	(Note: Formed by absorbing Alpha Tau Mu, established in 1985.)
Epsilon Zeta	United	April 2, 1987 – October 20, 2020	Humboldt State University	Arcata, California	Inactive	
Zeta Zeta	United	December 24, 1987 – 1992	Sacramento State University	Sacramento, California	Inactive	
Lambda Zeta	United	April 9, 1988 – 2021	St. Mary's University, Texas	San Antonio, Texas	Inactive	
Nu Zeta	United	April 16, 1988 – 1997	James Madison University	Harrisonburg, Virginia	Inactive	
Kappa Zeta	United	October 15, 1988 – 200x ?	Purdue University	West Lafayette, Indiana	Inactive	
Xi Zeta	United		University of Colorado Boulder	Boulder, Colorado	Never chartered	(Note: This chapter was established and named on December 24, 1988, but was never chartered.)
**Iota Zeta**	United	April 1, 1989 – 1997; 2024-	George Mason University	Fairfax, Virginia	Associate Chapter	
Mu Zeta	United	May 13, 1989 – 2006	University of Denver	Denver, Colorado	Inactive	
Beta Sigma Rho	United	December 24, 1989 – 1990	University of Minnesota Morris	Morris, Minnesota	Inactive	(Note: Formed by absorbing Beta Sigma Rho, established in 1984.)
Omicron Zeta	United		University of Utah	Salt Lake City, Utah	Never chartered	(Note: This chapter was established and named on December 24, 1989, but was never chartered.)
Rho Zeta	United	November 10, 1990 – 199x ?	Hofstra University	Hempstead, New York	Inactive	
Sigma Zeta	United	December 24, 1990 – 2002; 2009–2010	State University of New York at Albany	Albany, New York	Inactive	(Note: Formed by absorbing Nu Chi Phi (local), established in 1989.)
Upsilon Zeta	United		Marquette University	Milwaukee, Wisconsin	Never chartered	(Note: This chapter was established and named on December 24, 1991, but was never chartered.)
**Pi Zeta**	United	May 5, 1992	Binghamton University	Vestal, New York	Associate Chapter	
Phi Zeta	United		Illinois State University	Normal, Illinois	Never chartered	(Note: The colony was established and named on December 24, 1992, but was never chartered)
**Psi Zeta**	United	October 1, 1993	University of Texas at Dallas	Richardson, Texas	Active	
Delta Phi Sigma	United	1994–1998	Virginia Tech	Blacksburg, Virginia	Inactive	(Note: Formed by absorbing Delta Phi Sigma (local), established in 1992.)
Chi Zeta	United	December 24, 1994 – 20xx ?	Radford University	Radford, Virginia	Inactive	
**Tau Zeta**	United	March 25, 1995	Boston University	Boston, Massachusetts	Active	
**Omega Zeta**	United	June 27, 1998	University of North Florida	Jacksonville, Florida	Active	
Beta Theta	United	October 20, 1999 – 2004	Chowan College	Murfreesboro, North Carolina	Inactive	
**Delta Pi**	United	November 6, 1999	Georgia Southwestern State University	Americus, Georgia	Active	
Alpha Theta	United	October 21, 2000 – 200x ?	Oklahoma State University	Stillwater, Oklahoma	Inactive	
**Iota Theta**	United	February 21, 2001	Schreiner University	Kerrville, Texas	Active	
**Delta Theta**	United	April 16, 2001 – 201x ?; 2018	Clemson University	Clemson, South Carolina	Active	
**Epsilon Theta**	United	January 7, 2002 – 200x ?; 20xx ?	East Carolina University	Greenville, North Carolina	Active	
Mu Theta	United	April 9, 2002 – 2015	University of the Incarnate Word	San Antonio, Texas	Inactive	
Gamma Theta	United	April 27, 2002 – June 30, 2010	Indiana University of Pennsylvania	Indiana, Pennsylvania	Inactive	
**Zeta Theta**	United	March 7, 2003	State University of New York at Oneonta	Oneonta, New York	Active	
Kappa Theta	United	March 25, 2003 – 200x ?	Saint Leo University	St. Leo, Florida	Inactive	
Theta Theta	United	August 22, 2003 – 201x ?	Shorter College	Rome, Georgia	Inactive	
**Eta Theta**	United	November 21, 2003	University of Maryland, College Park	College Park, Maryland	Active	
**Lambda Theta**	United	September 28, 2004	University of Massachusetts Dartmouth	Dartmouth, Massachusetts	Active	
Nu Theta	United	February 11, 2007 – May 15, 2015	College of William & Mary	Williamsburg, Virginia	Inactive	
Alpha Pi Tau	United	March 7, 2009	Keene State College	Keene, New Hampshire	Inactive	
**Omicron Theta**	United	March 8, 2009	State University of New York at Plattsburgh	Plattsburgh, New York	Active	
**Pi Theta**	United	January 25, 2011 – September 16, 2020	University of Wisconsin–La Crosse	La Crosse, Wisconsin	Colony	(Note: Chapter was recolonized in the fall of 2025.)
**Xi Theta**	United	November 5, 2011 – 2019; 20xx ?	Southern Utah University	Cedar City, Utah	Active	(Note: Formed by absorbing Zeta Xi Zeta, established in 2008.)
Rho Theta	United	November 13, 2015 – February 4, 2021	Arizona State University	Tempe, Arizona	Inactive	(Note: The chapter lost its university recognition for health and safety violations,)
**Sigma Theta**	United	2017	Towson University	Towson, Maryland	Active	
**Upsilon Theta**	United	October 19, 2019	University of Tampa	Tampa, Florida	Active	
**Tau Theta**	United	November 9, 2019	Central Michigan University	Mount Pleasant, Michigan	Active	
**Georgia Gwinnett College Associate Chapter**	United	April 20, 2024	Georgia Gwinnett College	Lawrenceville, Georgia	Associate Chapter	
**FIU Associate Chapter**	United	2026	Florida International University	Westchester, Florida	Associate Chapter	
**University of Delaware Associate Chapter**	United		University of Delaware	Newark, Delaware	Associate Chapter	

== See also ==
- List of Chi Phi members
