= Saby Mitra =

American academic administrator and professor

Dean of the Warrington College of Business
- Incumbent
- Assumed office August 1, 2020
- Preceded by: John Kraft

Personal details
- Education: Indian Institute of Technology, Kanpur; University of Iowa
- Occupation: Academic administrator

Sabyasachi "Saby" Mitra is an American academic administrator and professor currently serving as the Dean of the University of Florida Warrington College of Business. He began his tenure in August 2020, succeeding John Kraft who had been the dean for the previous 30 years.

== Career ==
Prior to his appointment at the University of Florida, Mitra spent 27 years at the Georgia Institute of Technology Scheller College of Business, where he was the senior associate dean of faculty and research and held the Thomas R. Williams–Wells Fargo professorship. He started his tenure at Georgia Tech as an assistant professor of information systems in 1993 and was promoted to full professor in 2012.

Mitra's administrative roles at Georgia Tech included serving as the senior associate dean of programs from 2015 to 2019, overseeing all degree and non-degree programs in the Scheller College. He was responsible for managing faculty, doctoral programs, IT services, and administrative support staff, and contributed to efforts such as redesigning the promotion and tenure process and increasing diversity in the doctoral program.

In 2023, Mitra was selected by University of Florida President Ben Sasse to lead a search committee for the next provost.

== Research ==
Mitra's research spans a range of topics including IT security management, online consumer search, innovation in technology industries, the digital divide, IT outsourcing, and IT governance. His work has been published in prominent journals such as Management Science, Information Systems Research, and MIS Quarterly.

=== Selected publications ===
- Banker, Rajiv; Mitra, Sabyasachi; Sambamurthy, V. (2011). "The Effects of Digital Trading Platforms on Commodity Prices in Agricultural Supply Chains". MIS Quarterly. 35 (3): 599–611. doi:10.2307/23042798. JSTOR 23042798.
- Mitra, Sabyasachi; Karim, Antoine (1996). "Analyzing cost-effectiveness of organizations: the impact of information technology spending". Journal of Management Information Systems. 13 (2): 29–57. doi:10.1080/07421222.1996.11518122 – via Taylor & Francis.
- Mitra, Saby; Banker, Rajiv (15 August 2005). "Comparing commodity prices in electronic and traditional auctions: Empirical evidence from Indian coffee auctions". Proceedings of the 7th international conference on Electronic commerce – ICEC '05. pp. 233–235. doi:10.1145/1089551.1089597. ISBN 1-59593-112-0 – via ACM.
