= John Kraft (academic) =

American academic

Dean of the Warrington College of Business
- In office July 1990 – July 2020
- Succeeded by: Saby Mitra

Dean of the W. P. Carey School of Business
- In office 1986–1990

Personal details
- Education: University of Pittsburgh

Academic background
- Thesis: Nonlinear Demand Equations for Commercial Passenger Transport Modes (1971)
- Doctoral advisor: Dr. Asatoshi Maeshiro

Academic work
- Discipline: Economics
- Institutions: University of Florida; University of Pittsburgh

John Kraft is an American academic administrator and the former Dean of the Warrington College of Business at the University of Florida from 1990 to 2020. Prior to his position at the Warrington College of Business, he was the Dean of Arizona State University Business School from 1986 through 1990.

== Education ==
Kraft earned a Ph.D. in Economics from the University of Pittsburgh in 1971.

== Career ==
Kraft served as Dean of Arizona State University Business School from 1986 through 1990. After this, he served as Dean of the Warrington College of Business at the University of Florida from 1990 to 2020.

== Research ==
Kraft has published articles in the field of economics, in journals such as Applied Economics, Decision Sciences, Journal of Econometrics, Journal of Finance, Journal of Money Credit and Banking, Journal of Regional Science, Review of Economics and Statistics, and Regional Science and Urban Economics.

=== Selected publications ===
- Kraft, A.; Kraft, J. (1973). "Computer Applications in Teaching Econometrics". Decision Sciences. 4 (2): 284–294. doi:10.1111/j.1540-5915.1973.tb00990.x.
- Kraft, J.; Kraft, A. (1977). "Determinants of Common Stock Prices: A Time Series Analysis". The Journal of Finance. 32 (2): 417–425. doi:10.2307/2326775. JSTOR 2326775.
- Barth, J.; Kraft, A.; Kraft, J. (1979). "A Temporal Cross-Section Approach to the Price Equation". Journal of Econometrics. 11 (2–3): 335–351. doi:10.1016/0304-4076(79)90044-7.
- Blair, R. D.; Kraft, J. (1974). "Estimation of Elasticity of Substitution in American Manufacturing Industry from Pooled Cross-Section and Time-Series Observations". The Review of Economics and Statistics. 56 (3): 343–347. doi:10.2307/1923972. JSTOR 1923972.
