= Fisher School of Accounting =

School of the University of Florida, U.S.

- Type: Public
- Established: 1928/1977
- Parent institution: Warrington College of Business
- Dean: Gary McGill, Dean of Warrington College of Business
- Director: Brian Miller
- Undergraduates: 465
- Postgraduates: 186
- Location: Gainesville, Florida, U.S.
- Website: warrington.ufl.edu/about/fisher/

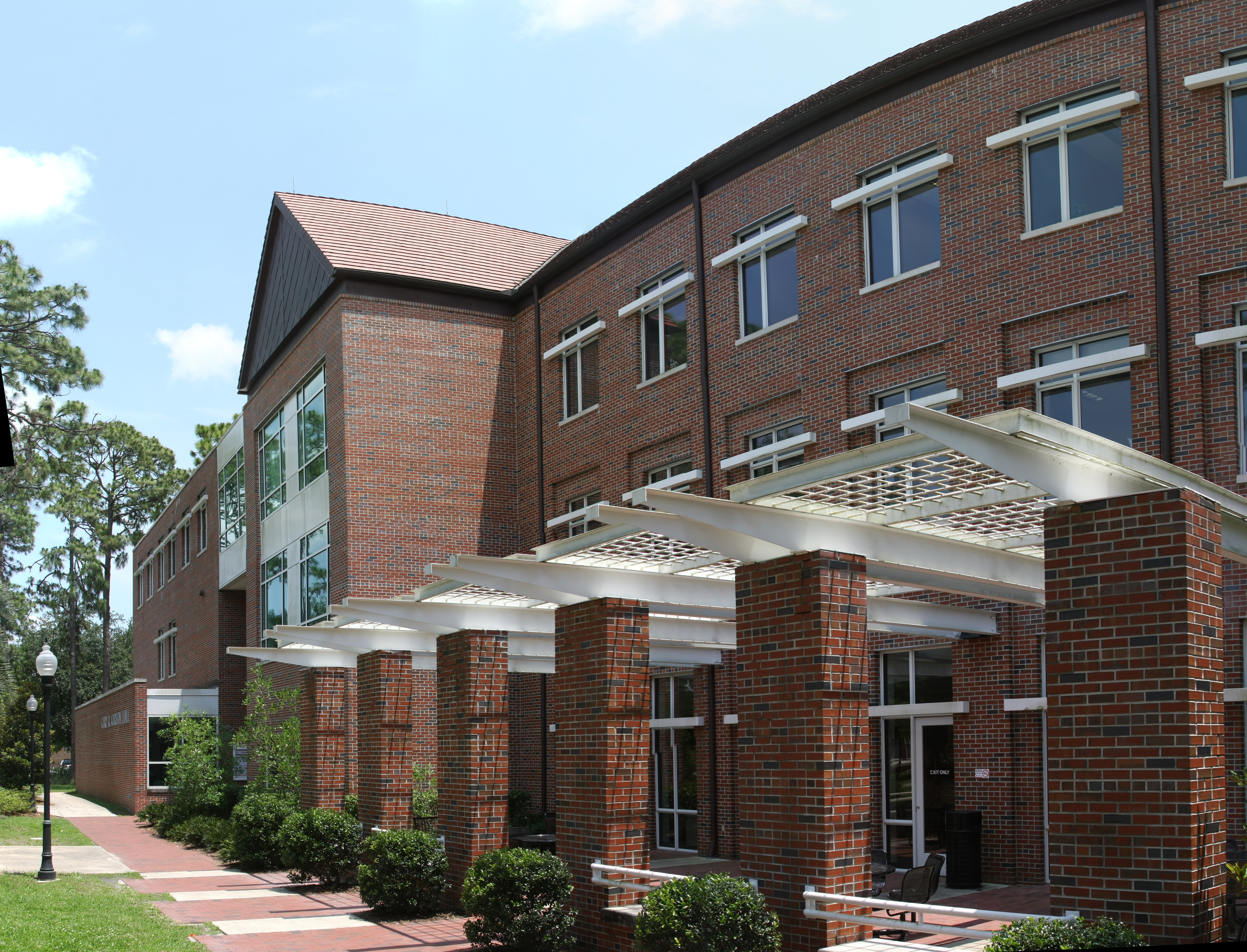
Gerson Hall, home of the Fisher School of Accounting

The Fisher School of Accounting is a department-level school within the Warrington College of Business at the University of Florida.

== History ==
In 1977, the School of Accounting was established by the Florida Board of Regents as a separate school within the Warrington College of Business, and was endowed in 1985 by Frederick Fisher. Dr. John Simmons was the founding director of the Fisher School. The School first conferred degrees in accounting in December 1978 although accounting has existed as a program in some form since 1928.

== Rankings ==
According to the 2025 US News Rankings, The Fisher School of Accounting's undergraduate and graduate accounting programs were ranked 5th and 6th among public universities. The School founded the Journal of Accounting Literature with Rashad Abdel-khalik and is home to the International Accounting and Auditing Center. Fisher School of Accounting graduates' pass rate on the Certified Public Accountant (CPA) exam has been traditionally nearly twice as high as the national average. In 2023, The Fisher School held an overall passing rate of 81.3% on all four parts of the CPA exam, ranking them 6th in the nation out of 264 institutions for overall passing rate.

== Program ==
The undergraduate Fisher School of Accounting offers a traditional Bachelor of Science in Accounting.

The graduate school offers a Master of Accounting with concentrations in Auditing and Taxation for students seeking careers as Certified Public Accountants. The school offers two combined-degree programs: one leads to the joint awarding of a Bachelor of Science in Accounting and a Master of Accounting, whereas the second partners with the Levin College of Law and offers a Juris Doctor (J.D.) degree along with a Master of Accounting.

Additionally, the Fisher School offers a Ph.D program in Accounting to prepare students for a career at academic research institutions. Graduates typically place at a Research I university. The most recent placements include University of Arizona, University of Maryland, Ohio State University, University of Illinois, University of Connecticut, Arizona State University, and The University of Kentucky, with international placements including The Chinese University of Hong Kong, Hanyang University, and The University of Waterloo.

== Students ==
The Fisher School of Accounting has approximately 465 undergraduate, 176 MAcc students, and 10 PhD students as of Fall 2024.

== Student outcomes ==
The majority of undergraduate students graduating from The Fisher School choose to pursue a graduate accounting degree in lieu of working full-time. The Master of Accounting program has boasted a near perfect employment record of 97.5% to 100% of its domestic students since the university began tracking employment outcomes in 2015, with over 80% of the graduating cohort accepting offers from Big Four accounting firms each year. The most common places of employment are based in the South Florida region and the cities of Atlanta, New York City, Miami, Tampa, Orlando, and Jacksonville.

== Faculty ==
Brian Miller is the current director, succeeding Gary McGill who was the longest-serving director of the Fisher School of Accounting before being appointed Dean of the Warrington College of Business, Fisher’s administrative parent unit. Mr. John Laibson is the director of student services. Other current faculty include Robert Knechel, Distinguished Professor and the Frederick E. Fisher Eminent Scholar, Stephen Asare, Jenny Tucker, Brian Miller, Marcus Kirk, Paul Madsen, Michael Mayberry, Lisa Hinson, Michael Ricci, Ruby Lee, Scott Rane, Dan Rimkus, Gabriel Pereira Pundrich, Ivy Munoko, Jill Goslinga, Chris Falk, Sonia Singh, Cindy Dosch, Joost Impink, Michael Schadewald, Don Monk, and Paige Bressler. Emeritus faculty include John Simmons, Joel Demski, Doug Snowball, Rashad Abdel-Khalik, Jack Kramer, Sandra Kramer, Bipin Ajinkya, Chuck McDonald, Dominique DeSantiago, Debbie Garvin, and Jesse Boyles.
