= Richard G. Newman =

- Education: Bucknell University (B.C.E, 1956); Columbia University (M.S., 1960); University of California, Los Angeles
- Occupations: engineer businessman
- Title: AECOM (CEO & Chairman); Ashland Technology Corp (President); Sempra Energy Co. (Director)

Richard G. Newman is an engineer and businessman. He was president, CEO and chairman emeritus for AECOM (NYSE:ACM), a United States provider of professional technical and management support services. Newman led the launch of AECOM as an independent company in 1990 and w as chief executive officer through September 2005. He led an employee and management purchase of AECOM's original companies from Ashland Corp.

Prior to the launch of AECOM, he was president of Ashland Technology Corp. as well as DMJM, an architecture, engineering and construction services firm, both before and after it was acquired by Ashland in 1984. Earlier, Newman was president of Genge, one of the first publicly traded architectural and engineering firms.

Newman is also a director of Southwest Water Company, Sempra Energy Co. and 13 mutual funds under Capital Research and Management Co.

== Education ==
- Bucknell University, Class of 1956, Bachelor of Science in Civil Engineering.
- Master of Science degree at Columbia University, 1960.
- Executive management graduate work at the University of California, Los Angeles.
