= AECOM =

American engineering firm

Coordinates: 32.929102°N 96.818143°W

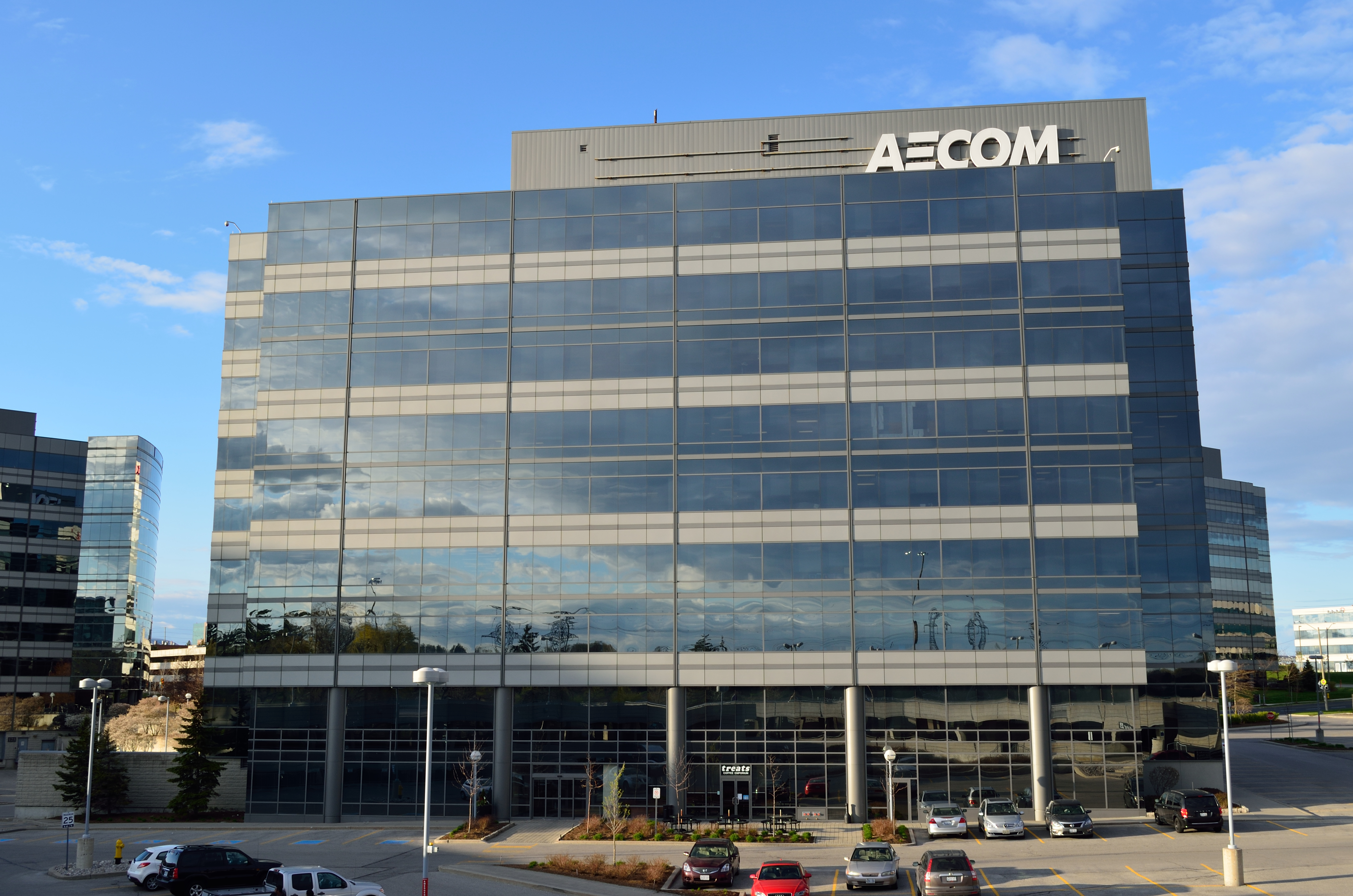
- AECOM office building in Markham, Ontario, Canada
- Formerly: AECOM Technology Corporation (1990–2015)
- Type: Public
- Traded as: NYSE: ACM; S&P 400 component
- Industry: Architecture; Urban Planning; Engineering; Construction
- Predecessor: Ashland Technology
- Founded: 1990; 36 years ago
- Headquarters: Dallas, Texas, U.S.
- Area served: Worldwide
- Key people: Troy Rudd (CEO)
- Services: Architectural engineering; Building design; Construction management
- Revenue: ▲US$16.1 billion (2025)
- Operating income: ▲US$1.03 billion (2025
- Net income: ▲US$562 million (2025)
- Total assets: ▲US$12.2 billion (2025)
- Total equity: ▲US$2.49 billion (2025)
- Number of employees: 51,000 (2025)
- Website: aecom.com
- Footnotes; Financials as of September 30, 2025.

AECOM (/eɪ.iːˈkɒm/, ay-ee-KOM; formerly AECOM Technology Corporation) is an American multinational infrastructure consulting firm headquartered in Dallas, Texas.

The company's official name from 1990 to 2015 was AECOM Technology Corporation, and is now AECOM. The company is listed on the New York Stock Exchange (NYSE) under the ticker symbol ACM.

As of 2023, AECOM had approximately 51,000 employees, and was number 291 on the 2023 Fortune 500 list.

== History ==
=== 1910–1990 ===
AECOM traces its origins to Kentucky-based Ashland Oil & Refining Company, which in turn grew out of Swiss Drilling Company, founded in Oklahoma in 1910 by J. Fred Miles. He gained control of some 200,000 acres and formed Swiss Oil Company in Lexington. In 1924, Miles launched a refining operation called Ashland Refining Company, headed by Paul Blazer. While the parent company struggled, leading to the ouster of Miles, Ashland prospered under Blazer's leadership, and in 1936, he was named chief executive officer of the reorganized company, Ashland Oil & Refining Company. In 1966, Ashland acquired Warren Brothers and became involved in highway construction and construction materials. The company was able to take advantage of refinery byproducts to produce asphalt. Ashland grew into one of the nation's major road-construction firms, and laid a foundation for AECOM. Through a series of acquisitions and technological developments, Ashland grew to include chemical, petrochemical, highway construction, and construction materials firms within its realm, laying the groundwork for a management buyout of Ashland Technology in 1985.

In the 1970s, Ashland Oil & Refining became Ashland Oil, Inc. Five years later the company consolidated its construction assets into a construction division and also formed a coal company subsidiary, indicative of a changing focus at Ashland. Although it generated more than $1 billion a year in sales, Ashland was a small player in the oil industry at a time when the cost of exploration was prohibitively expensive. By 1980, Ashland sold its production assets, and a year later was reorganized as a modified holding company. A new corporate strategy was implemented as Ashland now focused on refining and marketing and sought to grow its non-refining businesses.

In 1984, Ashland acquired Daniel, Mann, Johnson & Mendenhall (DMJM), an architectural firm located in Los Angeles, California. Originally focused on military architecture projects, after World War II it had become one of the first integrated engineering and architectural firms in the western United States. The acquisition of DMJM also included its president, Richard G. Newman. In 1985, DMJM became part of a new subsidiary, Ashland Technology Corporation. Two years later Newman was named its new chief executive and president.

When Ashland chose to return to its core petroleum refining business in the late 1980s, Newman recommended an employee buyback proposal, resulting in the spin-off of Ashland Technology and the creation of AECOM (Architecture, Engineering, Construction, Operations, and Management) in 1990. The company went on to acquire a number of engineering, design and planning firms including urbanism/sustainability practice EDAW, consultancy firm Economic Research Associates (ERA), environmental firms ENSR and The RETEC Group, architectural firm Ellerbe Becket and construction consultants Davis Langdon.

=== 2000–present ===
In 2000, AECOM acquired Metcalf and Eddy, a water and wastewater engineering firm based in Massachusetts and London-based Guy Maunsell International, expanding the firm's reach in the United Kingdom, Hong Kong/China, Australia and the Middle East. In 2003, AECOM developed an award-winning landscape plan for Jinji Lake in Suzhou Industrial Park; the lake was developed from a shallow and marshy pond into one of the largest lake front parks in China.

In September 2004, it acquired the Canadian company, UMA Engineering Ltd. ENSR and EDAW joined AECOM in 2005.

AECOM went public during May 2007 with an initial public offering on the NYSE, netting $468.3 million. In January 2008, AECOM acquired The Services Group, Inc., a provider of consulting services to the US Agency for International Development (USAID) and other multi-lateral donor organizations. In July 2008, AECOM purchased Earth Tech Inc., a consulting and engineering firm, from Tyco International for $510 million. On July 14, 2010, AECOM announced its acquisition of Tishman Construction Corp., a leading provider of construction management services in the United States, whose projects include both the building of the original Twin Towers in New York City in 1973 and One World Trade Center (Freedom Tower) in the aftermath of 9/11. On July 13, 2014, AECOM announced its acquisition of URS Corporation, an engineering, construction, and technical services firm for US$56.31 per share in cash and stock, pegging the enterprise value of URS at approximately $6 billion. Effective July 10, 2014, it acquired ACE International Consultants SL, a Madrid-based provider of consulting services. In July 2014, it acquired Hunt Construction Group, adding to AECOM's construction services business. In July 2017, AECOM acquired Shimmick Construction Company. Officials at the Golden Gate Bridge, Highway and Transportation District blamed the acquisition for delaying construction of a safety barrier at the bridge by 2 years.

In 2018, AECOM along with 91 additional Fortune 500 companies had "paid an effective federal tax rate of 0% or less" as a result of Donald Trump's Tax Cuts and Jobs Act of 2017.

In October 2019, AECOM announced plans to sell their Management Services division to private equity firm American Securities LLC and Lindsay Goldberg for $2.405 billion. Management Services provides services and support to governmental clients including the Department of Energy and Department of Defense. On January 31, 2020, this transaction was completed with the new company being called Amentum. In October 2020, AECOM announced the sale of its Power construction business to private equity firm CriticalPoint Capital. In December 2020, AECOM announced the sale of its Civil construction business, including Shimmick Construction, to private equity firm Oroco Capital, which completed January 5, 2021. AECOM explained these divestitures as a "transformation into a higher-margin, lower-risk Professional Services business".

In August 2021, AECOM announced plans to relocate its global headquarters from Los Angeles, California to Dallas, Texas.

In 2025, AECOM acquired Norway-based artificial intelligence start-up company Consigli.

== Services ==
AECOM provides Archaeology, Architecture & Design, Urban Planning, Landscape Architecture, Asset Management, Construction, Cost Management, Decommissioning & Closure, Economics, Engineering, Environmental Services, International Development, IT & Cyber Security, Operations & Maintenance, Planning & Consulting, Program Management/Construction Management, Risk Management & Resilience and Technical Services.

== Management ==
AECOM's first president and CEO was Richard G. Newman, who came to Ashland through its acquisition of Daniel, Mann, Johnson & Mendenhall (DMJM). Under Ashland Oil's ownership, he was president and chief operating officer of DMJM from October 1985 to December 1988. While president of Ashland Technology Corp. from December 1988 until May 1990, Newman was instrumental in taking it from a division of Ashland Oil to an independent company. He was president when the company changed its name to AECOM Technology Corporation in April 1990. Newman was president until 1993, and then chairman, president and CEO from May 1993 to October 2000, and chairman and CEO from 2000 to 2005.

In October 2005, John M. Dionisio succeeded Newman as president and CEO of AECOM. In 2011, Dionisio became chairman of the company, having been COO from October 2003 to October 2005 and president and CEO of the subsidiary DMJM+Harris from October 2000 to October 2003.

In October 2011, Michael S. Burke succeeded Dionisio as president and then in March 2014 succeeded him as CEO. Burke joined AECOM in 2005 and was appointed CFO in 2006.

In 2011, Stephen M. Kadenacy was named chief financial officer, later promoted to president and COO. In 2017, Kadenacy left the company and was succeeded as COO by Randy Wotring.

In November 2019, AECOM announced that Burke would retire as chairman and CEO. The change was announced to be effective after either the next annual meeting or completion of the search for a replacement. At the same time, AECOM said that the board of directors would be expanded to include representatives of activist-shareholder Starboard Value, the fifth largest shareholder. Amid market speculation that AECOM would be acquired by WSP Global, AECOM announced the selection of W. Troy Rudd to be CEO. The change will be effective as of October 1, 2020. Before his appointment as CEO, Rudd was CFO for the company. The announcement included naming Lara Poloni as the new president. The announcement resulted in the resignation of the Starboard Value board member in protest over the selection. AECOM was included on Fortune's list of the world's most admired companies in 2024.

As of April 2026, key leadership were:

- Troy Rudd, Chairman and Chief Executive Officer
- Lara Poloni, President
- Gaurav Kapoor, Chief Financial & Operations Officer
- David Gan, Chief Legal Officer
- Emily Gepner, Chief Human Resources Officer

== Corporate affairs ==
AECOM is headquartered in Dallas, Texas, United States, with clients in more than 150 countries. The company reported revenue of US$16.1 billion during the 12 months that ended September 30, 2025.

== See also ==
- List of S&P 400 companies
