= Ibrahim Baggili =

American cybersecurity scientist (born 1981)

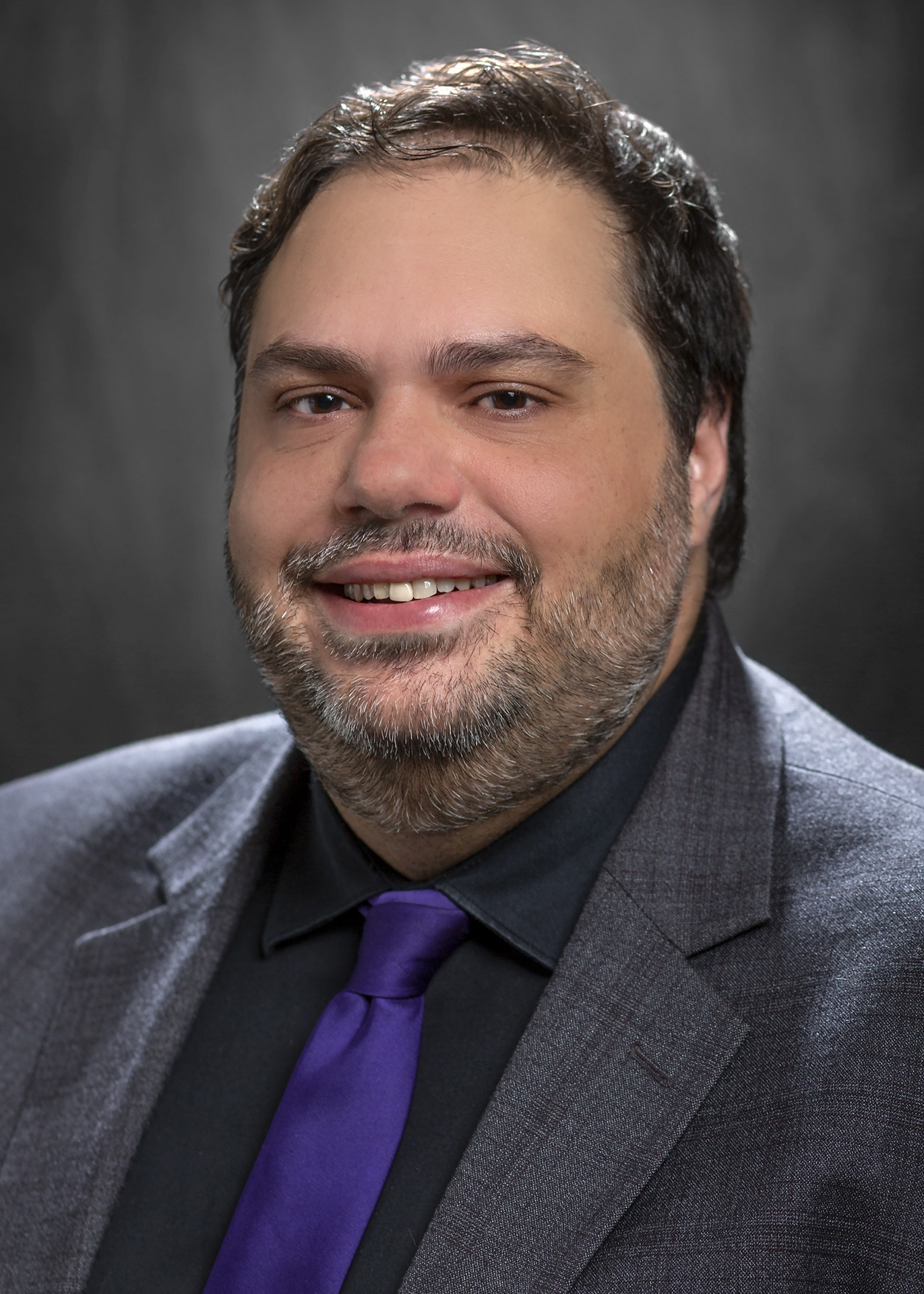
- Born: July 8, 1981 (age 45); Amman, Jordan
- Other name: Abe
- Citizenship: United States
- Education: Purdue University
- Known for: Digital Forensics, Cyber Forensics
- Spouse: Meghan Baggili
- Parents: Moussa Baggili (father); Rebecca Melikian (mother)
- Awards: Roger Richardson Professor, Elder Family Chair, EAI Fellow, Connecticut Civil Medal of Merit, Elected: Connecticut Academy of Science and Engineering
- Scientific career
- Fields: Cyber Forensics, Digital Forensics, Cybersecurity
- Thesis: Effects of anonymity, pre-employment integrity and antisocial behavior on self-reported cyber crime engagement: An exploratory study (2009)
- Academic advisors: Marcus Rogers
- Website: https://csc.lsu.edu/~baggili/

Ibrahim "Abe" Moussa Baggili was named the Chair of the Division of Computer Science and Engineering at Louisiana State University and the Roger Richardson Professor in 2024. He is also a digital forensics and cybersecurity scientist with a joint appointment between the college of engineering and the Center for Computation and Technology. Before that, he was the founder and director of the Connecticut Institute of Technology (CIT) at the University of New Haven. Baggili was also a full professor and Elder Family Endowed Chair at UNewHaven. He has a B.S., M.S., and Ph.D. in Computer and Information Technology from Purdue University's Purdue Polytechnic Institute. Baggili is a Jordanian/Arab American first generation college graduate and a well-known scientist in the domain of Cyber Forensics and Cybersecurity with seminal peer-reviewed work in the areas of Virtual Reality Forensics (VR) and security, mobile device forensics and security, application forensics, drone forensics and memory forensics.

== Awards & Notable Grants ==
Baggili has won several awards.

=== Notable Awards ===
- 2024: Named Roger Richardson Professor, Louisiana State University.
- 2024: Chair of the Division of Computer Science & Engineering, Louisiana State University.
- 2023: The Military Cyber Professionals Association awarded Baggili the prestigious medal of the Order of Thor at HammerCon 2023.
- 2022: Baggili was inducted into the Connecticut Academy of Science and Engineering (CASE).
- 2021: Baggili received the Connecticut Civilian Medal of Merit for training the Connecticut National Guard in Cybersecurity was only awarded to five people at the time.
- 2021: Best Paper Award, ARES, WSDF.
- 2020: Baggili has also been named a European Alliance for Innovation Fellow comprising 0.1% of the members.
- 2019: Baggili was named the last lecturer at the University of New Haven by University President Steven Kaplan - a video of the lecture is available on Youtube.
- 2018: Best Paper Award, ICDF2C.
- 2015: Baggili was named the Elder Family Chair of Computer Science and Cybersecurity at the University of New Haven.
- 2014: Best Paper Award, ICDF2C.
- 2008: Baggili was awarded the prestigious Bilsland Dissertation Fellowship at Purdue University in 2008.
- 2005: Nominated for 'The Chancellor's List' 'The highest academic honor to which students can aspire.
- 2002: Bachelor of Science with distinction, Purdue University, Dec 14, 2002.
- 2002: Recognized by the National Society of Collegiate Scholars.
- 2002: United States Achievement Academy, Computer Science Awards Winner, Spring 2002.
- 2001: Associate of Science with distinction, Purdue University, Dec 15 2001.

=== Notable Grants ===
- National Science Foundation Award # 1921813 - University of New Haven CyberCorps Scholarship for Service (SFS): Super Cyber Operatives (SCOs).
- National Science Foundation Award # 1900210 - SaTC: EDU: Expanding Digital Forensics Education with Artifact Curation and Scalable, Accessible Artifact Exercises.
- National Science Foundation Award # 1649101- National Workshop on Redefining Cyber Forensics.
- National Science Foundation Award # 1748950 - Exploring cybersecurity and forensics of Virtual Reality systems and their impact on cybersecurity education.

== Known For ==
Baggili, along with his students, are known for their contributions to the digital forensics and cybersecurity.

- His research with his students have uncovered vulnerabilities that affect over 1.5 billion people worldwide.
- His team was the first to explore memory forensics, and disk and network forensics of consumer Virtual Reality (VR) systems.
- His team was the first to show proof of concept attacks in consumer Virtual Reality (VR) systems, which inspired the creation of X-Reality Safety Initiative (XRSI).
- The freely available NSF funded Artifact Genome Project which curates digital forensic artifacts and digital forensic academic exercises.
- First Jordanian and Arab to pursue a PhD focus in Cyber Forensics.

== Career ==
Baggili was editor-in-chief for the Journal of Digital Forensics, Security, and Law. He has worked as a Digital Forensics Consultant for Cryptic Software Ltd. in the UK and as a Security Policies, Procedures and Standards Consultant for BISYS Education Services. In 2005, he founded Security Triangle in Amman Governorate, Jordan, and in 2010, he co-founded Viral Labs/Technologies, a start-up in the United Arab Emirates.

From 2009 to 2013 Baggili was an assistant professor at Zayed University, working on digital forensic research projects, where he chaired the second annual ICDF2C Conference. He also founded and directed the Advanced Cyber Forensics Research Laboratory, which helped train individuals in the public and private sector in several areas of cyber forensics, including network and small-scale device forensics.

In 2013, Baggili joined the University of New Haven as an associate professor and assistant dean. In 2021, he was made full professor elect. At the university, he has founded the Cyber Forensics Research and Education Group (UNHcFREG) and created the Artifact Genome Project (AGP). With mostly student researchers, the group has published papers on various cyber security and forensics topics, many of which have been presented at conferences such as the Digital Forensics Research Workshop and ICDF2C, and published in journals such as Digital Investigation. AGP was created with the help of Purdue University's VACCINE to address the need for a centralized location to share digital forensic artifacts. Since its inception, participants, ranging from federal agencies to universities to private companies, have uploaded over 1,200 artifacts. As a database, AGP has been utilized by investigators, and forteaching digital forensics.

At UNewHaven, Baggili also hosted GenCyber, a National Science Foundation and National Security Agency funded program, for several summers. The program aims to introduce a diverse student population to cybersecurity concepts by engaging them in hands-on activities and experiences.

In August, 2022, Baggili joined Louisiana State University as a full professor with a joint appointment between the college of engineering and the Center for Computation and Technology.

== Most-cited peer reviewed publications ==
- Al Mutawa N, Baggili I, Marrington A. Forensic analysis of social networking applications on mobile devices. Digital investigation. 2012 Aug 1;9:S24-33. (Cited 289 times, according to Google Scholar)
- Ruan K, Carthy J, Kechadi T, Baggili I. Cloud forensics definitions and critical criteria for cloud forensic capability: An overview of survey results. Digital Investigation. 2013 Jun 1;10(1):34-43. (Cited 237 times, according to Google Scholar.)
- Walnycky D, Baggili I, Marrington A, Moore J, Breitinger F. Network and device forensic analysis of android social-messaging applications. Digital Investigation. 2015 Aug 1;14:S77-84. (Cited 181 times, according to Google Scholar.)
- Karpisek F, Baggili I, Breitinger F. WhatsApp network forensics: Decrypting and understanding the WhatsApp call signaling messages. Digital Investigation. 2015 Dec 1;15:110-8. (Cited 134 times, according to Google Scholar.)
