= Warrington College of Business =

Business school of the University of Florida

Coordinates: 29.6475°N 82.345°W

- Type: Public business school
- Established: 1926
- Parent institution: University of Florida
- Dean: Gary McGill
- Students: 6,500
- Undergraduates: 5,000
- Postgraduates: 1,500
- Location: Gainesville, Florida, U.S.
- Website: warrington.ufl.edu

The Warrington College of Business is the business school of the University of Florida. Its subordinate schools include the Heavener School of Business (the undergraduate wing), the Hough Graduate School of Business (the graduate wing), and the Fisher School of Accounting.

About 6,300 students are enrolled in classes, including undergraduates and graduate students, including Master of Business Administration and Ph.D.-seeking students. All programs are accredited by the Association to Advance Collegiate Schools of Business.

== History ==
The college was named after its alumnus Alfred C. Warrington in 1996, in recognition of his donations to the college.

== Leadership ==
For over three decades, John Kraft served as the Dean of the Warrington College of Business. His tenure as Dean started in 1990, and ended in 2020. In March 2020, Saby Mitra was named the new Dean of the Warrington College of Business. Mitra started on August 1, 2020. Mitra left Warrington on August 1, 2026. Gary McGill was appointed as interim dean of the college. McGill previously served as the director of the Fisher School of Accounting since 2006 and Senior Associate Dean of the college.

== Academics ==
=== Undergraduate programs ===
Undergraduate programs are offered through the Heavener School of Business (Finance, General Studies, Information Systems, Management, and Marketing.) and the Fisher School of Accounting (Accounting).

=== Graduate programs ===
The Hough Graduate School of Business offers ten options for its MBA degree program (three full-time, two professional, two online and one executive). The MBA program’s professional options are offered in Miami and Jacksonville.

UF also offers business master's degrees in business analytics, entrepreneurship, finance, fintech, information systems and operations management, international business, management, marketing, and real estate.

=== Research ===
The Warrington College of Business was awarded $1.45 million in annual research expenditures in sponsored research for 2024.

=== International programs ===
International programs in more than 20 countries are offered to undergraduate and graduate students. The Master of International Business is the international graduate program offered. Students in this program may spend six weeks in a foreign country studying a specific industry, country, or global operation issue, but a study of at least one week abroad is required.

=== Entrepreneurship & Innovation Center ===
The college is home to the Entrepreneurship & Innovation Center. The center was founded in 2000 with the mission to introduce the concept of entrepreneurship to students and faculty, and offers one of the nation's only Master of Science degrees in Entrepreneurship.

=== Ethics program ===
The ethics program at the Warrington College of Business is conducted by the Elizabeth B. & William F. Poe, Sr. Center for Business Ethics Education and Research.

== Warrington College of Business Buildings ==
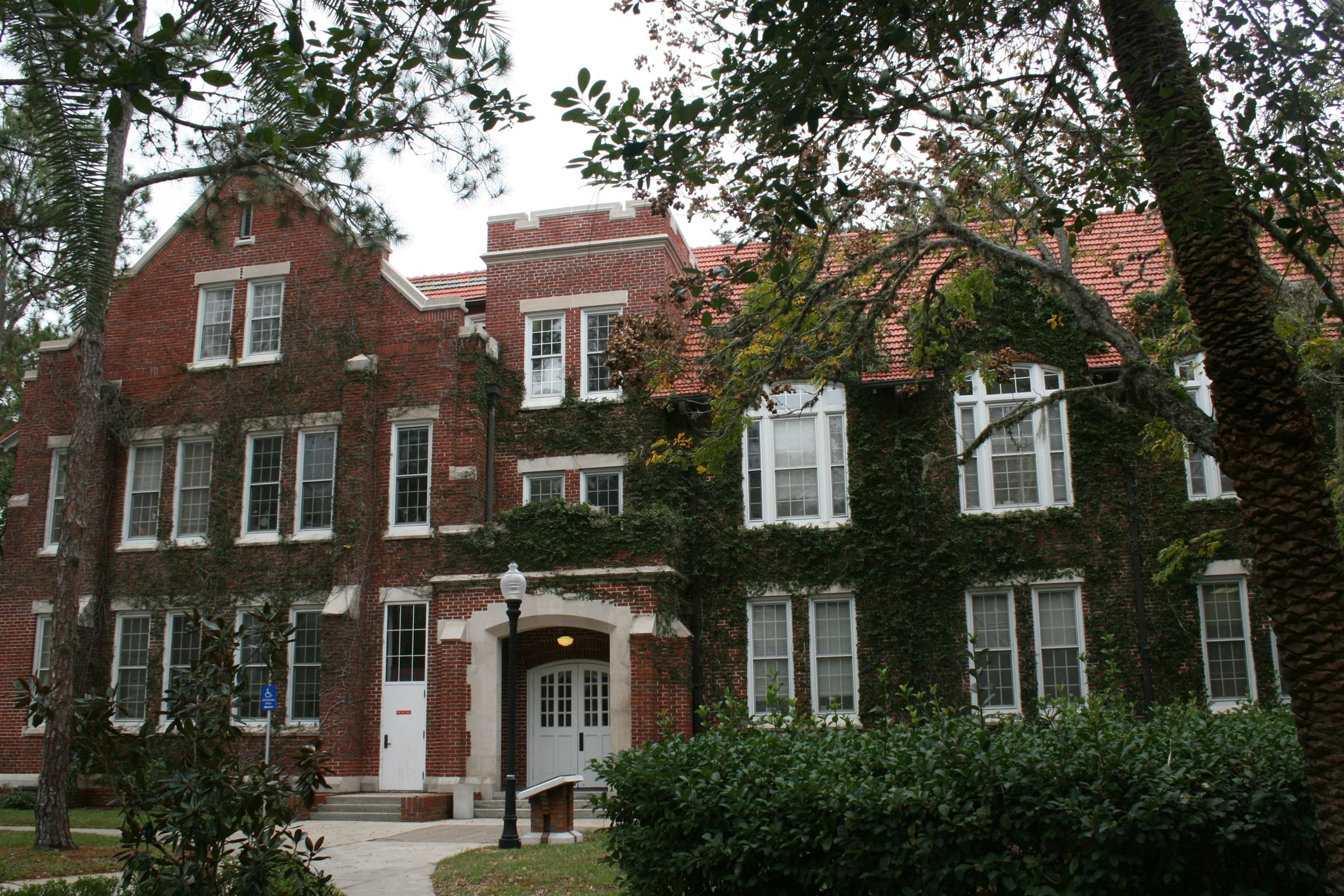
Bryan Hall

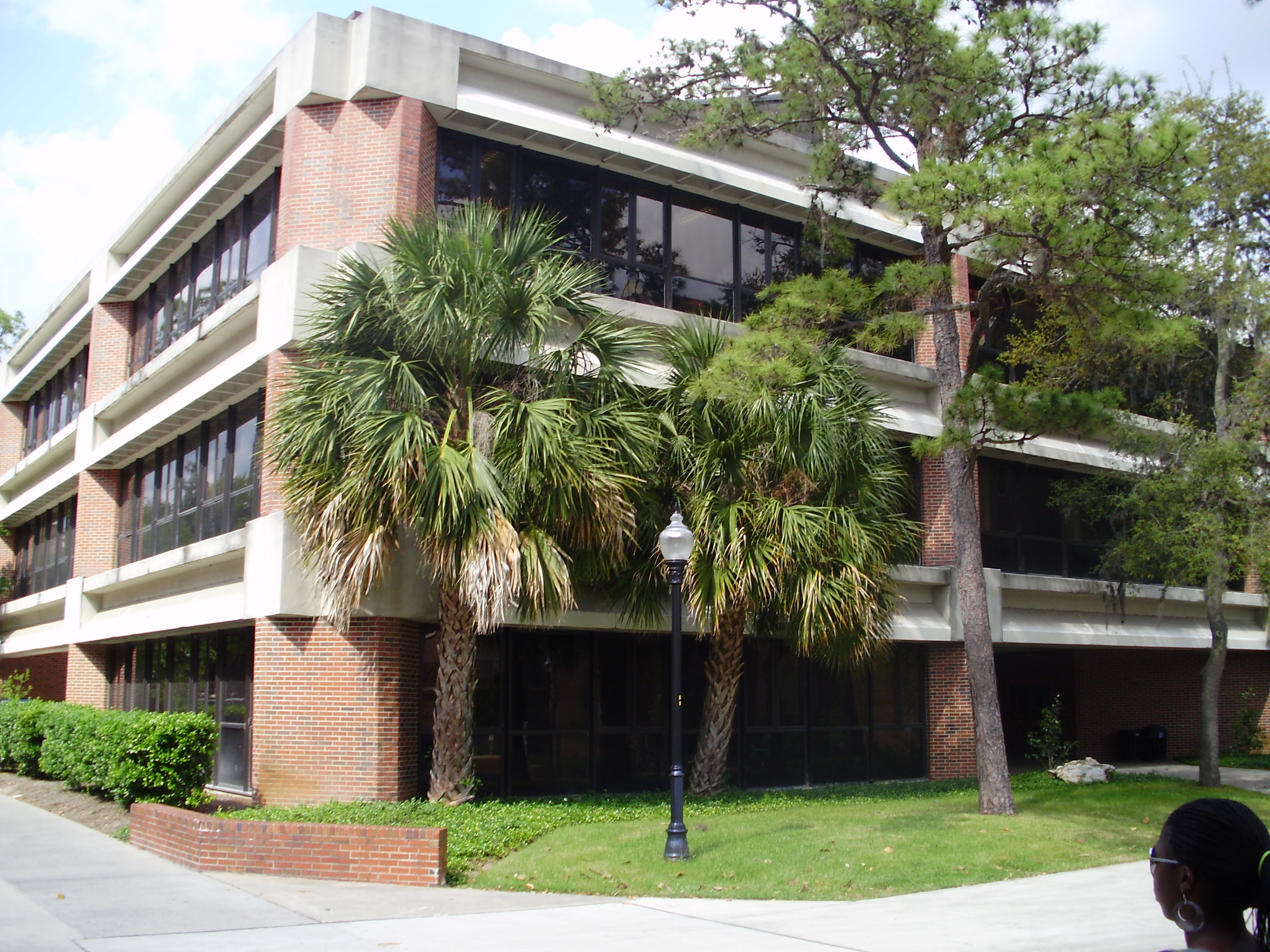
Stuzin Hall

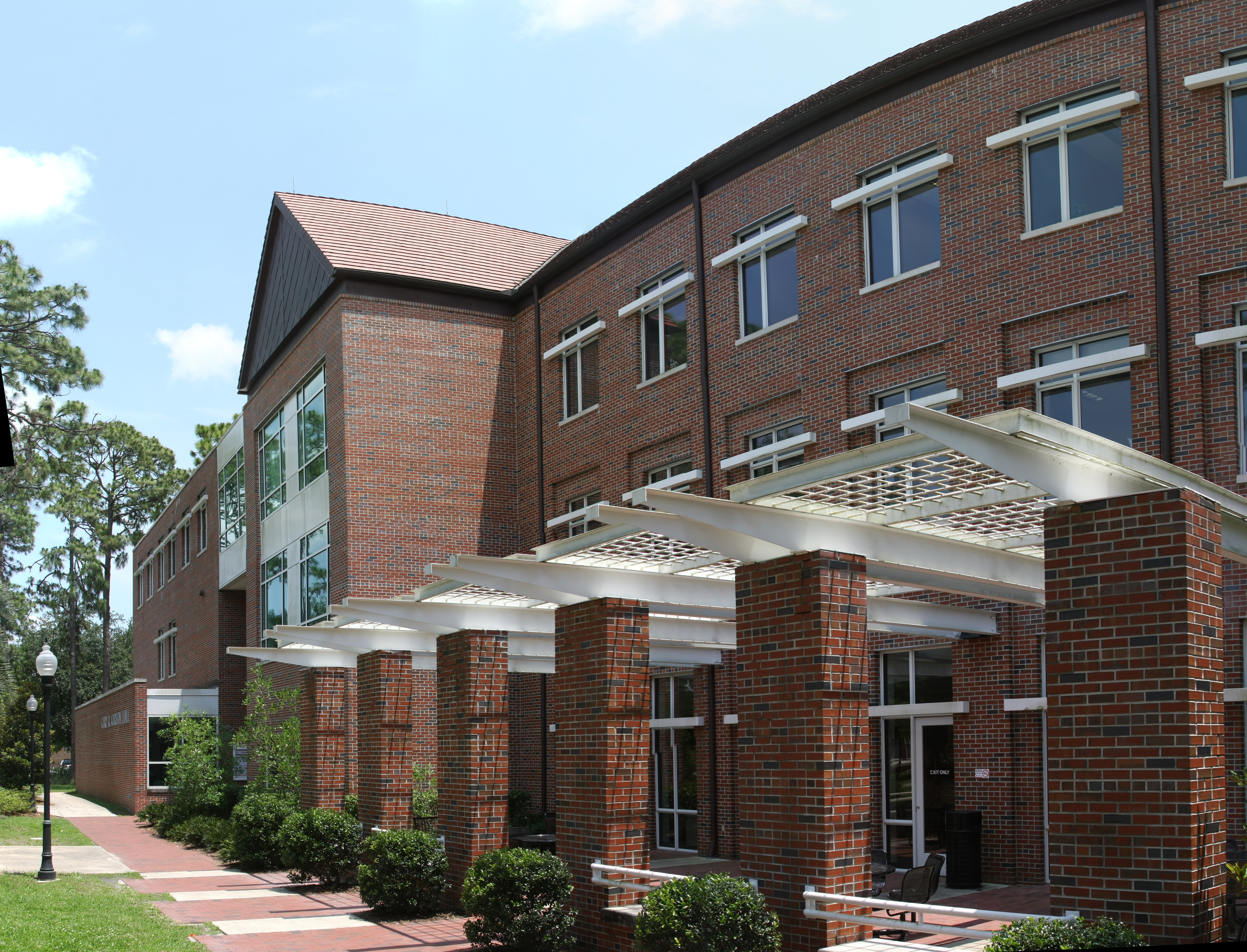
Gerson Hall

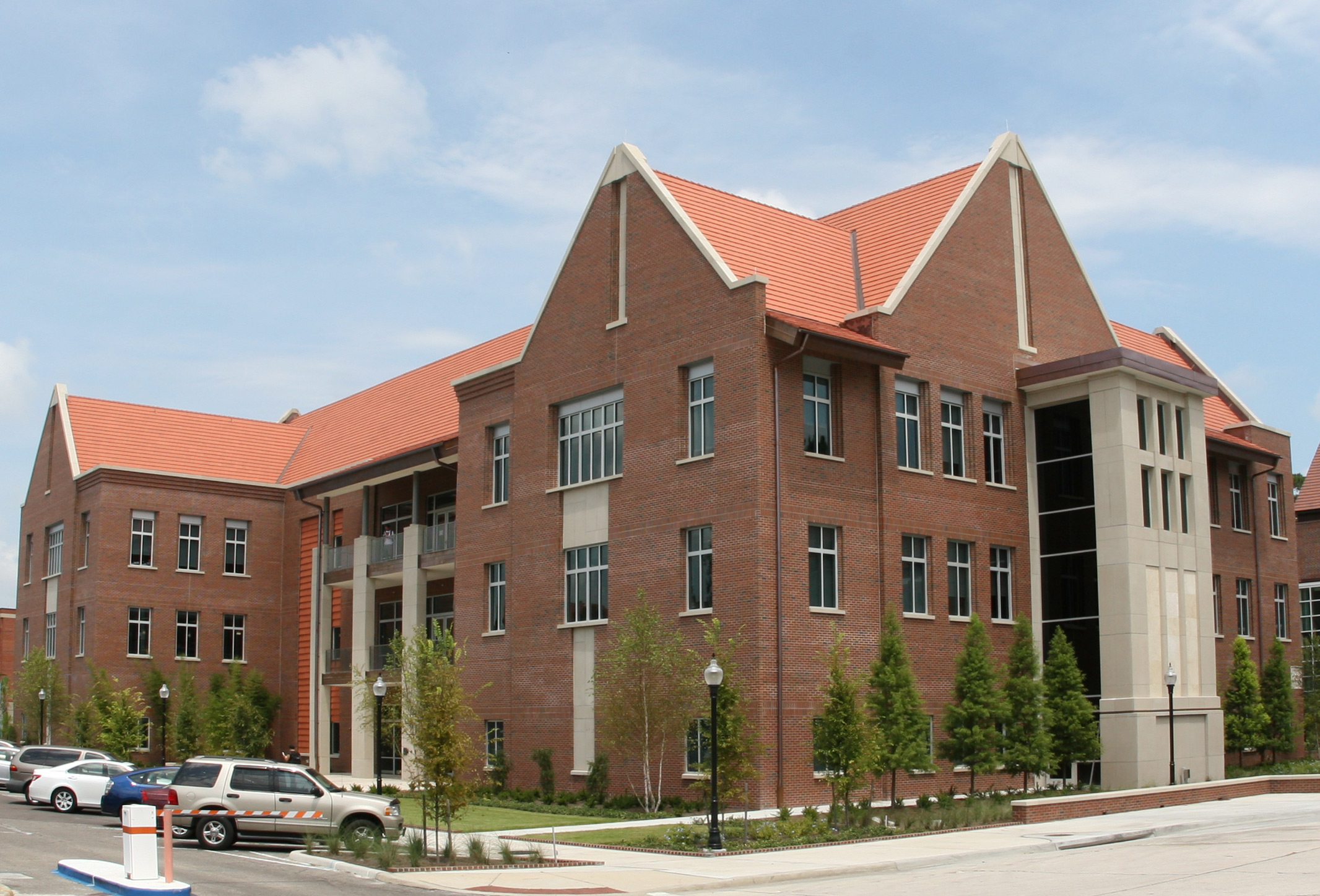
Hough Hall

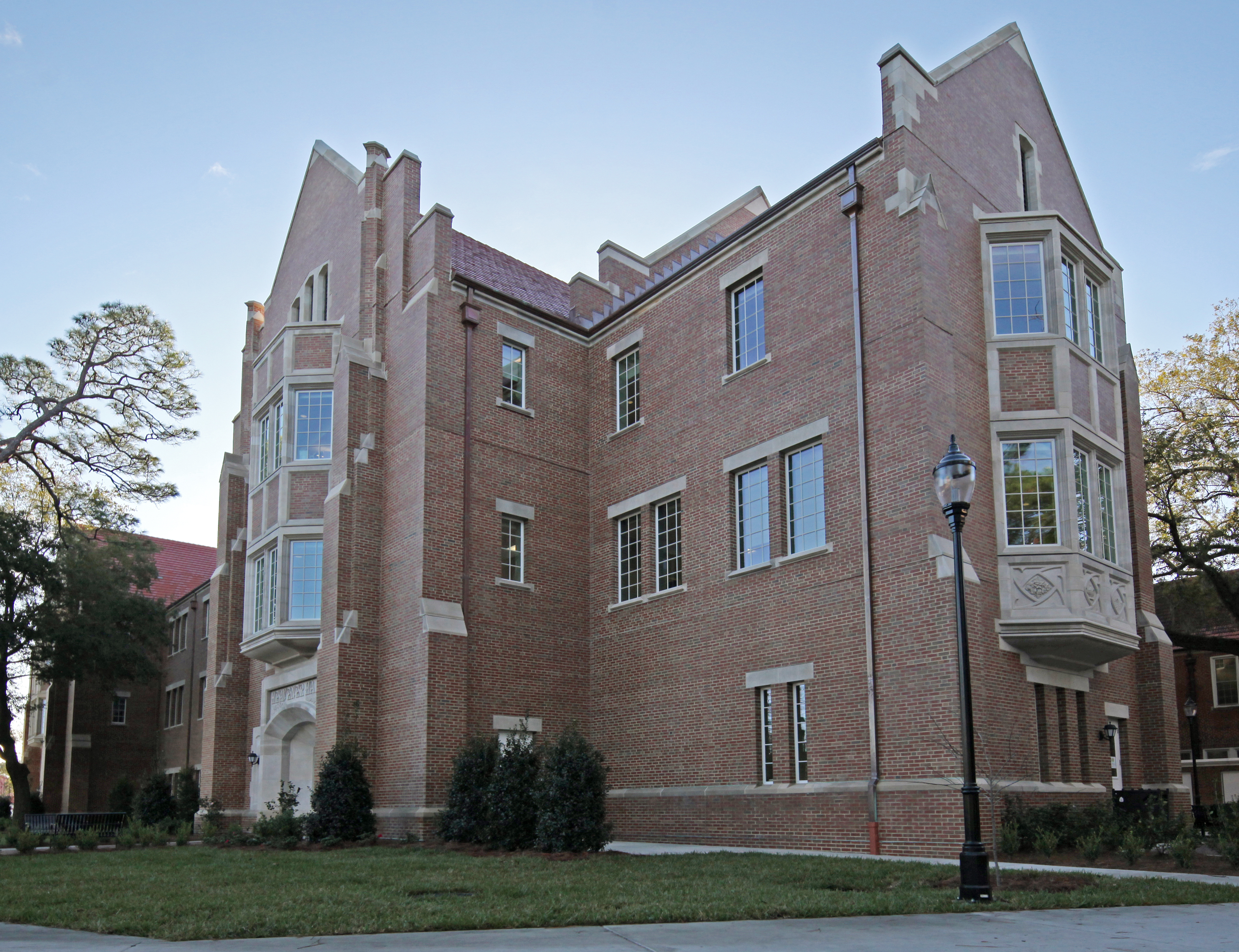
Heavener Hall

== Rankings ==
=== Undergraduate rankings ===
- 20th overall by the U.S. News & World Report, 2026
  - 6th for Real Estate
  - 8th for Accounting
  - 10th for Marketing
  - 29th for Finance

Business school rankings

U.S. MBA Rankings
- QS (2026): 25
- FT (2026): 23
- Bloomberg (2025): 38
- U.S. News & World Report (2026): 36

Global MBA Rankings
- QS (2026): 63
- FT (2026): 40

=== Graduate school rankings ===
==== Full-time MBA ====
- 39th overall by the U.S. News & World Report, 2026

==== Part-time MBA ====
- 30th overall Part-Time (Professional) MBA by the U.S. News & World Report, 2026

==== Online MBA ====
- 5th Best Online MBA Program by the U.S. News & World Report, 2026
- 3rd Best Online MBA Program for Veterans by U.S. News & World Report, 2026

== Department and schools ==
- Heavener School of Business
- Fisher School of Accounting
- Hough Graduate School of Business
- Department of Finance, Insurance and Real Estate
- Department of Information Systems and Operations Management
- Department of Management
- Department of Marketing
- Kelley A. Bergstrom Real Estate Center

== Programs ==
=== Undergraduate ===
- Bachelor of Arts in Business Administration (also available online)
  - General Studies
- Bachelor of Science in Business Administration (also available online)
  - Finance
  - Information Systems
  - Management
  - Marketing
- Bachelor of Science in Accounting

=== Graduate ===
- MBA
  - Full-Time
  - Online
  - Weekend Part-Time - Jacksonville
  - Weekend Part-Time - Miami
  - Executive
- Master's degrees
  - Accounting
  - Business Analytics
  - Data Science
  - Entrepreneurship
  - Finance
  - Fintech
  - Information Technology
  - International Business
  - Management
  - Marketing
  - Real Estate
  - Supply Chain Management

=== Doctorate ===
- Doctor of Business Administration
- PhD - Accounting
- PhD - Finance and Real Estate
- PhD - Information Systems & Operations Management
- PhD - Management
- PhD - Marketing

== See also ==
- List of United States business school rankings
- List of business schools in the United States
- Bryan Hall at UF
- Library West
