= List of Florida State University honorary degree recipients =

This list of Florida State University honorary degree recipients includes notable persons who have been recognized by Florida State University for outstanding achievements in their fields that reflect the ideals and uphold the purposes of the university, and to whom the university faculty has voted to award honorary degrees in recognition of such attainments. Often, but not always, the honorary degree recipients have been alumni of the university, or have had ties to either the university or the state of Florida.

Florida State University awarded its first honorary degree in 1912 to Rowena Longmire, founder and president of the Florida State College for Women (FSCW) Alumni Association. The first man to whom the university awarded an honorary degree was French diplomat and ambassador to the United States Henri Bonnet in 1950.

== Policy ==
According to the Faculty Handbook, the goal of honorary degrees is to honor persons of outstanding achievement who have gained national and/or international recognition and made a significant contribution to the United States, Florida or Florida State University through scholarly, creative, public, business, or humane endeavors. Consideration of current FSU employees or board members is only given under exceptional circumstances.

Anyone connected to the university may nominate an individual to the committee, but the nominations must be accompanied by supportive documentation including: a resume, curriculum vitae or biographical sketch; an explanation as to why an award should be given; and names and addresses of three distinguished persons willing and able to provide an objective evaluation of the nomination. Letters of recommendation from three distinguished persons may be submitted instead of the explanation and names & addresses.

== Committee ==
The University Honorary Degree Committee members and a chair are appointed by the university president to represent the educational community. As an advisory committee, they review each candidate's information and the committee votes up or down. A majority of committee members must be present. If the committee approves, the candidate becomes a nomination and is submitted to the president. If not approved, the candidate's information is removed from consideration. The president selects the recipients from a group of nominees for an honorary degree. Nominees not selected the first year are resubmitted the following year along with new nominations. If the nomination is not selected the second year, the nomination is removed from consideration and must be resubmitted to the committee.

== Honorary degree recipients ==
Recipient	Year/degree	Notability
Rowena Longmire	1912 M.A.	Education
Ruth Bryan Owen Rhode	1935 LL.D.	Public service
Henri Bonnet	1950 D.H.L.	International affairs
Mark Frederick Boyd	1950 D.Sc.	Medicine
Wouter Bleeker	1952 D.Sc.	Science
William Morrison Robinson, Jr.	1955 D.H.	History
Millard Fillmore Caldwell	1956 LL.D.	Public service
LeRoy Collins	1956 LL.D.	Public service
William George Dodd	1956 D.Litt.	Education
Spessard Lindsey Holland	1956 LL.D.	Public service
Philip Wylie	1956 D.Litt.	Literature
Doak Sheridan Campbell	1957 LL.D.	Education
Ernst von Dohnanyi	1957 Mus.D.	Music
George A. Smathers	1957 LL.D.	Public service
J. Velma Keen	1959 LL.D.	Business
Cyril O. Houle	1960 LL.D.	Education
Glenn T. Seaborg	1961 D.Sc.	Science
Vivian Ahlsweh Williams	1961 D.Litt.	Literature
Leonard J. Brass	1962 D.Sc.	Science
Thomas B. Swann	1962 LL.D.	Business/public service
Pablo Casals	1963 Mus.D.	Music
Luther H. Hodges	1963 LL.D.	Business/public service
Karl Zerbe	1963 D.F.A.	Art
Cecil Farris Bryant	1964 LL.D.	Public service
Edwin A. Menninger	1964 D.Sc.	Science
Dorothy Barclay Thompson	1964 D.H.L.	Journalism
Arthur Statan Adams	1965 LL.D.	Science/public service/education
J. J. Daniel	1965 LL.D.	Law/business
Robert J. Van de Graaff	1965 D.Sc.	Science
Michael E. DeBakey	1968 D.Sc.	Medicine
Lamar Dodd	1968 D.F.A.	Art/education
Robert L. Shaw	1968 Mus.D.	Music
Lucius D. Battle	1969 D.H.L.	Public service
Andres Segovia	1969 Mus.D.	Music
Alan S. Boyd	1970 LL.D.	Public service
Audrey Wood Liebling	1970 D.H.L.	Literature
Gregor Piatigorsky	1970 Mus.D.	Music
Nelson Poynter	1970 D.H.L.	Public service
Paul M. Rudolph	1971 D.F.A.	Architecture
Ed V. Komarek	1971 D.Sc.	Science
Wilbur J. Cohen	1972 D.H.	Education
John Mackay Shaw	1972 D.H.	Poetry
Karl Dietrich Bracher	1973 D.H.L.	History
William D. McElroy	1973 D.Sc.	Science
Allen Morris	1973 D.H.L.	Public service
Julia V. Morton	1973 D.Sc.	Science
Philip Handler	1975 D.Sc.	Humanities
Helen Hayes MacArthur	1975 D.H.L.	Theatre
King Hussein I	1975 D.H.L.	Public service
Chester H. Ferguson	1976 D.H.L.	Education/public service
Stephen C. O'Connell	1976 D.H.L.	Education/law
Mae Knight Clark	1977 D.H.L.	Education
Lee Strasberg	1977 D.F.A.	Theatre
Herbert Spencer Zim	1977 D.Sc.	Science/education
Lillian Gordy Carter	1978 D.H.L.	Public service
Michael Butler Yeats	1978 LL.D.	International affairs
William H. Werkmeister	1978 D.H.L.	Philosophy
Rev. Charles K. Steele, Sr.	1979 D.H.L.	Public service
William Styron	1979 D.Litt.	Literature
B. K. Roberts	1980 D.H.L.	Public service/law
Burt Reynolds	1981 D.H.L.	Theatre
Roger L. Stevens	1982 D.H.L.	Theatre
Ricardo de la Espriella	1983 LL.D.	Public service
Beth Walton Moor	1983 D.H.L.	Public service
William C. Norris	1983 D.H.L.	Business/public service
Rafael Caldera	1984 D.H.L.	Public service/education
John P. McGovern	1984 D.Sc.	Medicine
Claude Pepper	1985 D.H.L.	Public service
Don Fuqua	1986 D.Sc.	Public service/science
Daisy Parker Flory	1986 D.H.L.	Public service
Joseph Papp	1986 D.H.L.	Theatre
Reubin Askew	1988 D.H.L.	Public service
Toshiaki Ogasawara	1988 D.H.L.	Public service
George Langford	1989 D.H.L.	Business/public service
G. William Miller	1989 D.H.L.	Finance/public service
D. Burke Kibler	1990 D.H.L.	Business/public service
Gunther Schuller	1991 Mus.D.	Music
Gus A. Stavros	1991 D.H.L.	Business/public service
Robert Edward Turner, III	1991 D.H.L.	Business/public service
Marguerite Neel Williams	1991 D.H.L.	Modern languages
Ada Belle Winthrop-King	1991 D.H.L.	Theatre
Louise Ireland Humphrey	1992 D.H.L.	Public service
Oscar Arias Sanchez	1992 D.H.L.	Public service
Walter Lanier "Red" Barber	1993 D.H.L.	Public broadcasting
D. Allan Bromley	1993 D.Sc.	Public service
Betty Mae Jumper	1994 D.H.L.	Public service
Simon Ostrach	1994 D.E.Sc.	Space science/engineering
Rosa L. Parks	1994 D.H.L.	Civil rights
C. DuBose Ausley	1995 D.H.L.	Public service
William R. Mote	1996 D.Sc.	Marine science
Sir James Lighthill	1996 D.Sc.	Mathematics
Russell V. Ewald	1997 D.H.L.	Public service
Louis J. Hector	1997 D.H.L.	Public service
Ben Weider	1997 D.H.L.	Public service
James M. Moran	1997 D.H.L.	Business
Richard W. Ervin	1997 LL.D.	Public service
Charles B. Reed	1997 D.H.L.	Education
Rod M. Brim, Sr	1998 D.H.L.	Business
John Paul Stevens	1998 LL.D.	U.S. Supreme Court
Godfrey Smith	1998 D.H.L.	Business
Mart Pierson Hill	1999 D.H.L.	Public service
Carl A. DeSantis	1999 D.H.L.	Business
Thomas F. Petway, III	1999 D.H.L.	Business
James C. Smith	2000 D.H.L.	Public service
Ann Reinking	2001 D.F.A.	Dance/theatre/film
Reid B. Hughes	2001 D.H.L.	Business/public service
Charlotte Edwards Maguire	2002 D.H.L.	Medicine/public service
Herbert F. Morgan	2003 D.H.L.	Public service
DeVoe L. Moore	2005 D.H.L.	Business/public service
Carlisle Floyd	2005 D.H.L.	Music/opera
Jim Shore	2005 LL.D.	Business/public service
Tom Brokaw	2006 D.H.L.	Broadcasting & journalism
Mary Lou Norwood	2007 D.H.L.	Public service
Albert J. Dunlap	2007 D.H.L.	Business
Mark S. Wrighton	2007 D.H.L.	Chemistry
Kitty B. Hoffman	2007 D.Sc.	Chemistry
Edward W. Rabin	2007 M.B.A.	Business
Ernest Cook	2008 D.H.L.	Medicine
Charles A. Smith	2008 M.B.A.	Business
Paul Kagame	2009 LL.D.	Public service
Lee Corso	2012 D.H.L.	Media and communication
Edward O. Wilson	2012 D.H.L.	Evolutionary biology
Judith A. Dunlap	2012 D.H.L.	Philanthropy
Tommie Wright	2012 Mus.D.	Music
Margaret "Maggie" Allesee	2013 D.H.L.	Choreography
Robert "Bobby" Bowden	2014 D.H.L.	Athletics/public service
Louise Jones Gopher	2014 D.H.L.	Public service
Lucy Ho	2015 D.H.L.	Public service
Christopher Still	2016 D.H.L.	Art
Grace Dansby	2016 D.H.L.	Philanthropy/public service
Allan G. Bense	2019 D.H.L.	Business/public service
William T. Hold	2021 D.H.L.	Business/insurance

== Key to degree abbreviations ==
=== Honorary degrees ===
- D.C.L. – Doctor of Civil Law
- D.D. – Doctor of Divinity
- D.E.Sc. – Doctor of Engineering Science
- D.F.A. – Doctor of Fine Arts
- D.H.L. – Doctor of Humane Letters
- D.Litt. – Doctor of Letters or Literature
- D.P.A. – Doctor of Public Administration
- D.P.S. – Doctor of Public Service
- D.Sc. – Doctor of Science
- D.H. – Doctor of Humanities
- LL.D. – Doctor of Laws
- Mus.D. – Doctor of Music

=== Earned degrees ===
- B.A. – Bachelor of Arts
- B.S. – Bachelor of Science
- J.D. – Juris Doctor (professional law degree; replaced LL.B.)
- LL.B. – Bachelor of Laws (former law degree; superseded by J.D.)
- M.A. – Master of Arts
- M.B.A. – Master of Business Administration
- M.S. – Master of Science
- Ph.D. – Doctor of Philosophy (terminal graduate research degree in most disciplines)

== See also ==
- Florida State Seminoles
- History of Florida
- History of Florida State University
- List of Florida State University people
- List of presidents of Florida State University
- List of Florida State University Torch Award recipients
