= List of Florida State University Torch Award recipients =

== FSU Torch Award ==
The award is named after the three torches on the seal of Florida State University. Each torch represents one Latin word of the school's motto: Vires, embodying moral, physical and intellectual strength; Artes, expressing an appreciation of aesthetics and the beauty of intellectual pursuits; and Mores, exhibiting respect for customs, character and tradition.

=== History ===
The actual name of the award is Faculty Senate Torch Awards, established in 1996 as a means for the faculty to honor the friends of FSU who have made sustained and significant contributions to the university's ability to fulfill its academic mission. Initially, the Faculty Senate presented the awards at the Annual Faculty Awards Ceremony held at the end of the school year. A few years later, the event was moved to the Fall as part of the Fall Faculty Meeting. In 2012, the university administration suggested raising the prestige of the award by funding a special awards dinner including the Provost.

=== Committee ===
Committee membership consists of no more than 10, but at least 7 members, including Ex officio members. The President of the Faculty Senate appoints committee members. Appointees must be a combination of retired and active faculty. One or more members must be on the Faculty Senate Steering Committee (FSSC). The President of the FSU Foundation or their representative is Ex officio but has voting rights. Committee members serve a term of three years except for the FSSC member. Committee members may make recommendations to fill vacancies and recommend a chairperson for the Torch Awards Committee to the FSSC.

The committee accepts nominations and recommends recipients for the awards to the FSSC, which has final approval. The letter of nomination should document the nominee's contributions and accomplishments that support the university's ability to effectuate its academic mission. There need not be recipients for all categories of the award, but there may be multiple recipients for any or all categories in a given year. Current university employees are not eligible for a Torch Award.

In addition, the Torch Awards committee is responsible for recommending possible candidates for the Fred L. Standley Distinguished Service Professor award which is given for extraordinary service to Florida State University by a faculty member. It is only given occasionally (not yearly) for exceptional candidates. As of 2025, it has been awarded five times.

== Torch Award recipients ==
Year	Vires awards	Artes awards	Mores awards
2024	Joseph (Joe) Torgesen	Andre Thomas	Allen Durham; Bill Durham
2023	Benjamin Crump; Charles (Charlie) Nam	Les & Ruth Akers; Robert (Bob) Howard	none
2022	Vasken Hagopian; Clifford Madsen; Patricia Yancey Martin	none	Janet Stoner; Alicia Crew
2021	Dr. Gregory J. Beaumont	Ginger Wetherell	Warrick D. Dunn
2020	Fred H. Flowers; Doby Lee Flowers	Dorothy Chao Jenkins	Paula Peters Smith; William Godfrey Smith II
2019	Sean Pittman	Howard Tibbals; Charles & Persis Rockwood	Valliere Richard Auzenne
2018	Melvin Stith, Jr. Charlie Ward, Jr.	Don Gibson; Barry Jenkins	Mark & Nan Hillis
2017	Kirby Kemper; Jan Moran	none	Guy Spearman; Ash Williams
2016	Paula Fortunas	Davis Gaines	David Stanford Warmath
2015	Anne Rowe	none	Charles Ehrhardt; Harold Knowles
2014	Mark Ellis; Jim Jones	Lucy Ho	Debra Brock
2013	Marie E. Cowart	Richard R. Portman	Fred L. Standley; Nancy A. Turner
2012	Fred Leysieffer; Marilyn Young	Lynda Keever	Stella Cottrell
2011	John E. Thrasher	John M. McKay	Maxwell Carraway, Jr. Patrick Hogan
2010	James C. Smith	none	Sherrill Williams Ragans
2009	Joseph L. Camps	Florence H. Ashby	James C. Smith
2008	Clifford R. Hinkle	JoAnn Blackwell	Betty Lou Joanos
2007	Frankie Strickland	Don Ungurait	Leo Sandon, Jr
2006	Wayne Minnick	Carlisle Floyd; Gregory Choppin	James Melton; Bernard and Greta Sliger
2005	Charlotte Maguire; Russell Kropp	Sarah Jane Alexander	Beverly Spencer; Seminole Tribe of Florida
2004	Ken Van Assenderp	Mart Hill	Steve Edwards; Joseph Hiett
2003	Carl Blackwell	none	Milton Carothers
2002	Ray Solomon	Nancy Smith Fichter	Betty L. Harrison; Sarah L. Marxsen; Mary Lou Norwood; Shirley R. Tellander
2001	John E. Champion; Mary L. Champion	Richard G. Fallon	Daisy Parker Flory
2000	Robert M. Johnson; C. David Smith	Jeffrey Shaara	Don Veller
1999	Lynette Thompson	Wiley and Lucilla Housewright	DuBose Ausley
1998	Gus A. Stavros	none	Jessie Ball duPont Fund; Mart Hill
1997	Godfrey Smith; George Langford	William Rogers	Kitty Hoffman

== See also ==
- Florida State Seminoles
- History of Florida
- History of Florida State University
- List of Florida State University people
- List of presidents of Florida State University
- List of Florida State University honorary degree recipients
