= Dale W. Lick =

American College President and administrator

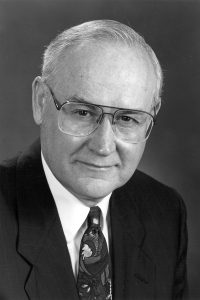

11th President of Florida State University
- In office 1991–1993
- Preceded by: Bernard F. Sliger
- Succeeded by: Sandy D'Alemberte

15th President of the University of Maine
- In office 1986–1991
- Preceded by: Arthur M. Johnson
- Succeeded by: Frederick E. Hutchinson

13th President of Georgia Southern University
- In office 1978–1986
- Preceded by: Pope A. Duncan
- Succeeded by: Nicholas L. Henry

Personal details
- Born: January 7, 1938 , USA Marlette, Michigan, U.S.
- Spouse: Marilyn Kay Foster (m. 1956)
- Children: 2, including Diana & Ronald
- Education: Michigan State University BS, MS (mathematics); University of California, Riverside PhD (mathematics)
- Occupation: American mathematician college president
- Known for: briefest presidency at FSU
- Website: Dale Lick

Dale Wesley Lick (born June 1, 1933) is an American mathematician, professor and college president at three universities.

== Early life and education ==
Born in Marlette, Michigan, Lick was raised in the heart of the rural Michigan Thumb. His father was a farmer and he was the younger of two brothers. He graduated from Lapeer High School in 1955 and married his sweetheart Marilyn Foster the following year. He earned his bachelor's degree in mathematics at Michigan State University in 1958. He was a research and teaching assistant at MSU while completing his master's degree in 1959, also in mathematics.

== Career ==
Lick's first job after graduation was across the state near his family home at Port Huron Junior College (now St. Clair County Community College). He was an instructor and chairman of the department of mathematics for a year before moving to California to begin work on his doctorate and teach at the University of Redlands from 1961 to 1963. He subsequently contributed during the 1964 and 1965 academic year as a mathematics TA at the University of California, Riverside, departing after receiving his doctorate to join the faculty at the University of Tennessee as an assistant professor of mathematics for the 1965–66 academic year.

Lick completed a postdoctoral fellowship at the Brookhaven National Laboratory from 1967 until 1968, and returned to Tennessee as an associate professor for a year. While at UT, Lick also served as a scientific consultant to the US Atomic Energy Commission in Oak Ridge, Tennessee.

Lick became an associate professor at Drexel University and was named head of the mathematics department before departing for Russell Sage College in 1972. He was vice president of academic affairs until 1974 when he became dean of sciences and health professions at Old Dominion University.

=== Georgia ===
Lick was inducted as president at Georgia Southern College (now Georgia Southern University) in 1978. In a recent interview, he related the three things he accomplished at Georgia Southern that he was most proud of. The first was establishing a Nursing School. When exploring this goal, his vice-chancellor referred him to a woman named Em Olivia Bevis. She was known in nursing circles throughout Georgia as an influential nurse educator. She worked with the Georgia Southern faculty to develop a BSN program with an emphasis on rural nursing.

The second was restarting football. The Georgia Normal School in the mid-1920s had a successful football team until the start of World War II, when football was discontinued. Lick knew he would need an exceptional head coach to be successful, and everyone he talked to told him Erk Russell would be great. "Erk" was a great athlete at Auburn University, lettering in four sports. He was a popular and charismatic defensive coordinator at the University of Georgia for 17 years. Lick gave Georgia president Fred Davison a courtesy call. In disbelief, Davison told Lick to speak to head coach Vince Dooley. Lick said, "Vince laughed when I told him." Coach Russell visited Statesboro three times. His biggest attraction was the opportunity to build a program from the ground up. The college was able to provide an acceptable compensation package, the community pledged their financial support, and the coach signed on.

The third was related to the second: he insisted on a marching band to go with football. Lick simply announced that part of the funds raised for football would support the band.

After nine years in Statesboro he became the president of the University of Maine.

=== Maine ===
While there, he led the group that created the American University in Bulgaria.

=== Florida ===
Lick was invested as president of Florida State University in 1991 and during his tenure, he is credited with beginning construction of the University Center, the installation of the National High Magnetic Field Laboratory, establishment of the FSU London Study Center and a revived emphasis on diversity and women in hiring. His presidency ended early due to controversy.

== Controversies ==
A quote from Lick in 1989 would return to haunt him: "A black athlete can actually outjump a white athlete on the average, so they're better at the game."

=== Maine ===
When Lick was president of the University of Maine in 1989, he was in a meeting and was asked how to increase minority involvement in Maine university sports. A journalist from the student newspaper tape-recorded the conversation. His infamous reply referred to basketball. He made the above quote and followed it up with: "All you need to do is turn to the NCAA playoffs in basketball to see that the bulk of the players on those outstanding teams are black." Students, faculty, the chancellor and other officials criticized the president, saying his comments were "insensitive and showed poor judgment". Lick apologized and stated that he thought he was making a statement of science, not opinion. "The last thing I wanted to do was offend people." The controversy eventually died down and Lick faced no punishment.

=== Michigan ===
After serving two years as president of FSU, the presidency of Lick's alma mater, Michigan State University opened in 1993. Lick claimed he was recruited and could not pass up the opportunity. Initially considered the leading candidate, his popularity took a nosedive when the Detroit Free Press repeated Licks statements from 1989. After discussion and deliberation, the presidential search was restarted and Lick returned to FSU. Eventually, the job was offered to and accepted by M. Peter McPherson.

=== Florida ===
Upon his return to Tallahassee, Lick found his relationship with some influential alumni and faculty had chilled. When Lick was hired, his primary focus was to be fund-raising. They were puzzled why he considered leaving immediately before FSU began the biggest donor campaign in the school's history. His loyalty was questioned. Lick had failed to notify the University Chancellor Charles Reed before flying to Michigan twice within one week to interview. The Florida Board of Regents were unaware of Lick's interest until the media revealed that Lick was a finalist for the job.

Upon Lick's return, he was in limbo for three weeks. Both the Chancellor and a committee of Regents were tasked with evaluating Lick's performance and his standing with faculty, alumni and boosters. Lick attempted to keep his job by visiting constituents on campus and off; asking people to write letters. Prominent FSU alumnus Jim King, a State Representative from Jacksonville, stated that many alumni were sensitive to being considered Licks second-choice, and the fact that he was rejected by his alma mater. King added that another problem with Lick was that "he was never able to establish a constituency." Al Lawson, a State Representative from Tallahassee, insisted that Lick "might not have fit in with some of the good ol' boys network, but you couldn't ask for a person of more quality." He called the regent's actions a "hatchet job". Evaluating committee members worked individually to avoid the requirements for public meetings. Each interviewed people from FSU before talking to Lick. Tom Petway was committee chairman who also chaired the search committee that selected Lick. After meeting Lick for lunch, Petway returned to Jacksonville and Lick cancelled his afternoon appointments.

One newspaper noted the irony that Lick was rejected at Michigan State by black members of the community who viewed the 1989 remarks as racist. Lick's biggest supporters at Florida State were African-American alumni, students, faculty and staff. Prior to his hire in 1991, Lick's 1989 comments were discussed at length, but were not significant in his selection. Upon his return to Florida, the "racist" remarks weren't even discussed.

Everyone insisted that resigning was Lick's decision, but it was apparent that he was told that did not have the support to remain president. Reed said they spoke to negotiate the terms of a resignation. Reed noted that "He (Lick) said he came to the conclusion it would be in the best interest of FSU and wanted to talk to me about how to make the transition."

Lick resigned as FSU president effective August 31, 1993.

During a formal statement, Lick stated, "Obviously, it is personally painful and difficult for me to leave the presidency. Controversy surrounding myself as an individual, however, cannot be allowed to hinder progress for Florida State University. While I am disappointed that I will no longer be able to lead all its efforts, I am pleased that I will remain at Florida State in a faculty position and continue to contribute to its future." Lick paused before continuing, "I'm not feeling very good about the circumstances and where I am, but maybe it's a blessing in disguise. I tend to believe that things have a way of working out for the best, whatever happens, if you try hard to make it so. And I'm going to try very hard to make it so."

=== Post presidency ===
Lick became a tenured professor with appointments his academic field, mathematics, and educational policy. He was also a contributor to the FSU Learning Systems Institute. His $165,000 salary was cut by 10 percent on September 1, 1993, and another 10 percent in 1994. His contract was changed to nine months in 1995 with a reduction of 20 percent in pay. Lick and family remained in the president's house until January 1, 1994. He went on sabbatical for the fall of 1993 and returned to teach the spring 1994 semester.

== Later years ==
As of 2006, Lick had served as chairman of the board for the technology company, Hylighter LLC, and has been a member on the board of trustees at Graceland University since 2016. He published over 100 research articles, 285 newspaper columns and eight books.

=== Family ===
As of 2023, Lick was residing in Tallahassee with his wife of 67 years, Marilyn. She is an ordained minister in the Community of Christ and has stayed active in both church and community. They enjoy square dancing and returning to Michigan to see family and friends. The couple have two children, Ron and Diana, and three grandchildren.

=== Honors ===
Lick was the recipient of the 2010 International Peace Prize from the United Cultural Convention, honored by Michigan State University with the 2006 Distinguished Alumni Awar'; given the One of 40 Alumni Who Make a Difference award by University of California, Riverside and in 2016 recognized by the non-alumni emeritus award, the Distinguished Service Award at FSU.

A bronze statue and plaque were placed in front of the Stone College of Education building on the Tallahassee campus in honor of his years as president, part of Legacy Walk III.

== Books ==
- Fundamentals of Algebra (1970)
- Whole-Faculty Study Groups: A Powerful Way to Change Schools and Enhance Learning (1998)
- New Directions in Mentoring: Creating a Culture of Synergy (1999)
- Whole-Faculty Study Groups: Creating Student-Based Professional Development (2001)
- Whole-Faculty Study Groups: Creating Professional Learning Communities That Target Student Learning (2005)
- Whole-Faculty Study Groups Fieldbook: Lessens Learned and Best Practices From Classrooms, Districts, and Schools (2007)
- Schoolwide Action Research for Professional Learning Communities: Improving Student Learning Through The Whole-Faculty Study Groups Approach (2008)
- Schools Can Change: A Step-By-Step Change Creation System for Building Innovative Schools and Increasing Student Learning (2012)

== See also ==
- List of Florida State University people
- List of presidents of Florida State University
