= Southern Scholarship Foundation =

Student aid organization in Florida, US

- Founded: 1955
- Type: Non-profit, educational
- Purpose: Provides rent-free housing scholarships to students with financial need, academic merit, and good character.
- Location: Tallahassee, Florida, U.S.
- Region served: Florida
- Method: Rent-free, cooperative living scholarship houses
- Key people: Shawn Woodin (President/CEO)
- Affiliations: Florida State University (FSU); Florida A&M University (FAMU); Tallahassee Community College (TCC); University of Florida (UF); Santa Fe College; Florida Gulf Coast University (FGCU)
- Revenue: $1.93 million (2023)
- Expenses: $2.21 million (2023)
- Website: southernscholarship.org
- Formerly called: Southern Scholarship and Research Foundation

The Southern Scholarship Foundation (SSF) is an American non-profit organization that provides rent-free housing to students who demonstrate financial need, academic merit, and good character while attending one of seven eligible partner colleges and universities in Florida.

The organization operates a unique cooperative living model across its scholarship houses, requiring student residents to manage the day-to-day operations of the house, including cooking, cleaning, and financial management, in exchange for rent-free accommodations.

== History ==
The Southern Scholarship Foundation was officially incorporated in 1955 in Tallahassee, Florida. The program began with a handful of young men living in a repurposed army barracks. The Internal Revenue Service granted the organization tax-exempt status in 1957. Over the following decades, the foundation expanded its capacity and established partnerships with several major universities in the state.

As of 2025, the organization states that it has served over 10,000 students since its inception. Dr. Bernard F. Sliger, President Emeritus of Florida State University, once referred to the SSF as "one of the most effective organizations in the nation" for assisting talented students who are financially challenged.

== Scholarship and Operations ==
The SSF does not provide direct monetary tuition scholarships; its primary support is in the form of housing. This is often referred to as a "housing scholarship" or "rent-free scholarship."

=== Cooperative Living Model ===
The core of the SSF program is its cooperative living model. Residents are responsible for managing all aspects of the house, which typically include purchasing groceries, preparing meals, conducting maintenance, and adhering to strict financial and academic guidelines.

The cooperative arrangement is cited by the foundation as a method for teaching practical life skills, fostering leadership, and building a sense of community, while simultaneously offsetting the operational costs of the home. Students are generally required to maintain a cumulative grade point average (GPA) of 3.0 or higher and maintain financial eligibility for the duration of the scholarship.

=== Locations and Partner Institutions ===
As of 2025, SSF operates 26 scholarship houses located near the campuses of its partner institutions. The foundation maintains partnerships with the following colleges and universities in Florida:

- Florida A&M University (FAMU)
- Florida Gulf Coast University (FGCU)
- Florida State University (FGCU)
- Santa Fe College (SFC)
- Tallahassee Community College (TCC)
- University of Florida (UF)

== Financial Data and Recognition ==
The Southern Scholarship Foundation is recognized as a 501(c)(3) non-profit organization.

The organization has consistently received high ratings from independent charity evaluators, include a four-start rating from Charity Navigator and a platinum transparency rating from Candid, indicating sound financial management and a commitment to accountability. Its total revenue in 2023 was reported to be over $1.9 million, with an endowment value exceeding $10.7 million.
