= Petway =

Petway is a surname. Notable people with the surname include:

- Brent Petway (born 1985), American basketball player
- Bruce Petway (1885–1941), American baseball manager and player
- David Petway (born 1955), American football player
- Robert Petway (1907–1978), African-American blues singer and guitarist
- Tom Petway (born 1940), American businesspeople
