= 2004 United States presidential election in Florida =

- November 2, 2004
- Turnout: 74.2% (▲4.1 pp)

Nominee	George W. Bush	John Kerry
Party	Republican	Democratic
Home state	Texas	Massachusetts
Running mate	Dick Cheney	John Edwards
Electoral vote	27	0
Popular vote	3,964,522	3,583,544
Percentage	52.10%	47.09%

Bush
40–50%
50–60%
60–70%
70–80%
Kerry
40–50%
50–60%
60–70%
President before election
George W. Bush
Republican
Elected President
George W. Bush
Republican

The 2004 United States presidential election in Florida took place on November 2, 2004, as part of the 2004 United States presidential election. Voters chose 27 representatives, or electors to the Electoral College, who voted for president and vice president.

Florida was won by incumbent President George W. Bush by a 5.01% margin of victory. Prior to the election, most news organizations considered this a tossup, or swing state, but was eventually described as leaning towards Bush near the end of the campaign. Once again, Florida was under the national spotlight due to its high number of electoral votes and the fresh memory of the controversy surrounding the 2000 Florida vote. Turnout was much higher, going from an estimated 6 million voters in 2000 to over 7.5 million voters showing up to vote in 2004.

Bush's more comfortable victory in Florida this time around was attributed to the popularity of his brother, Jeb, who was the state's governor and had approval ratings greater than 60%. Kerry became the first Democrat since Michael Dukakis in the 1988 election to not flip a single county in the state, although he did improve on Al Gore's margins in Gadsden County and Jefferson County.

== Campaign ==
=== Predictions ===
There were 12 news organizations who made state-by-state predictions of the election. Here are their last predictions before election day.

Source	Ranking
D.C. Political Report	Lean R
Associated Press	Tossup
CNN	Likely R
Cook Political Report	Tossup
Newsweek	Tossup
New York Times	Tossup
Rasmussen Reports	Tossup
Research 2000	Tossup
Washington Post	Tossup
Washington Times	Tossup
Zogby International	Tossup
Washington Dispatch	Likely R

=== Polling ===
Poll source	Date(s) administered	Sample size	Margin of error	John Kerry (D)	George W. Bush (R)	Ralph Nader (I)	Other	Undecided
Quinnipiac	October 27–31, 2004	1,098	± 3.3	43%	51%	1%	0%	4%
Quinnipiac	October 22–26, 2004	944	± 3.2	46%	49%	1%	0%	4%
Quinnipiac	October 15–19, 2004	808	± 3.5	47%	48%	1%	0%	4%
Quinnipiac	October 1–5, 2004	717	± 3.7	44%	51%	0%	0%	5%
Quinnipiac	September 18–21, 2004	819	± 3.4	41%	49%	5%	0%	5%
Quinnipiac	August 5–10, 2004	1,094	± 3.0	47%	41%	4%	0%	7%
Quinnipiac	June 23–27, 2004	1,209	± 2.8	43%	43%	5%	1%	9%

Throughout the general election, candidates exchanged narrow leads in the state. The final 3 poll averaged showed Bush leading with 49% to Kerry's 47%.

=== Fundraising ===
Bush raised $16,956,510. Kerry raised $7,285,151.

=== Advertising and visits ===
This state was heavily targeted as a swing state. Over the course of the election, Bush visited the state 15 times to Kerry's 18 times. Also, both candidates spent heavily on television advertisements, spending an estimated $3 million each week.

== Analysis ==
During the 2004 U.S. presidential election, numerous allegations of irregularities were made concerning the voting process in Florida. These allegations included missing and uncounted votes, machine malfunction, and a lack of correlation between the vote count and exit polling.

In the prior election, Ralph Nader obtained over 2% of the vote, thus Bush won with less than 50% of the vote, making his approval rating and his brother's approval ratings the deciding factor of the state. Polls throughout the campaign indicated that Florida was too close to call, prompting concerns about a repeat of the 2000 fiasco. However, the high popularity of George W. Bush's brother, Republican Governor Jeb Bush, contributed to a relatively comfortable victory for Bush, by a margin of 5% over his Democratic rival, John Kerry. Despite this, Florida remained the most Democratic of the 11 states of the former Confederacy, and Kerry's 5% loss in Florida was the closest he came to carrying any Confederate state.

While the South Florida metropolitan area mostly voted for Kerry, the other parts of the state mainly supported Bush, being culturally closer to the rest of the southern United States than to Miami, home to large Hispanic and Jewish populations, as well as retirees and transplants from the largely liberal Northeastern United States.

Key to Bush's victory was increased turnout in Republican areas. Bush's margin of victory in several counties topped 70%, particularly in the Florida Panhandle. Bush also won a significant number of heavily populated and fast-growing areas including Jacksonville, the entire Tampa Bay area, Southwest Florida, Orlando, the Space Coast, and Ocala.

Osceola and Hillsborough counties would not vote Republican again until 2024.

As of the 2024 presidential election, this is the last time that the city of Orlando has voted Republican in a presidential election. This is also the last time Miami-Dade County, the state's most populous county, voted for the candidate who lost the national popular vote, and the only time it has done so since 1968.

== Results ==
United States presidential election in Florida, 2004
Party	Candidate	Running mate	Votes	Percentage	Electoral votes
Republican	George W. Bush (Inc.)	Dick Cheney (incumbent)	3,964,522	52.10%	25
Democratic	John Kerry	John Edwards	3,583,544	47.09%	0
Reform	Ralph Nader	Peter Camejo	32,971	0.43%	0
Libertarian	Michael Badnarik	Richard Campagna	11,996	0.16%	0
Constitution	Michael Peroutka	Chuck Baldwin	6,626	0.09%	0
Green	David Cobb	Patricia LaMarche	3,917	0.05%	0
Socialist	Walter Brown	Mary Alice Herbert	3,502	0.05%	0
Socialist Workers	James Harris	Margaret Trowe	2,732	0.04%	0
Totals			7,609,810	100.00%	27
Voter turnout (Voting Age)					74.0%

=== By county ===
County	George W. Bush Republican		John Kerry Democratic		Various candidates Other parties		Margin		Total votes cast
County	#	%	#	%	#	%	#	%	Total votes cast
Alachua	47,762	42.90%	62,504	56.14%	1,062	0.95%	-14,742	-13.24%	111,328
Baker	7,738	77.73%	2,180	21.90%	37	0.37%	5,558	55.83%	9,955
Bay	53,404	71.18%	21,068	28.08%	552	0.74%	32,336	43.10%	75,024
Bradford	7,557	69.62%	3,244	29.88%	54	0.50%	4,313	39.74%	10,855
Brevard	153,068	57.66%	110,309	41.55%	2,085	0.79%	42,759	16.11%	265,462
Broward	244,674	34.61%	453,873	64.21%	8,325	1.18%	-209,199	-29.60%	706,872
Calhoun	3,782	63.42%	2,116	35.49%	65	1.09%	1,666	27.93%	5,963
Charlotte	44,428	55.68%	34,256	42.93%	1,102	1.38%	10,172	12.75%	79,786
Citrus	39,500	56.86%	29,277	42.15%	690	0.99%	10,223	14.71%	69,467
Clay	62,078	76.17%	18,971	23.28%	446	0.55%	43,107	52.89%	81,495
Collier	83,631	64.99%	43,892	34.11%	1,160	0.90%	39,739	30.88%	128,683
Columbia	16,758	67.06%	8,031	32.14%	202	0.81%	8,727	34.92%	24,991
DeSoto	5,524	58.09%	3,913	41.15%	73	0.77%	1,611	16.94%	9,510
Dixie	4,434	68.83%	1,960	30.43%	48	0.75%	2,474	38.40%	6,442
Duval	220,190	57.78%	158,610	41.62%	2,261	0.59%	61,580	16.16%	381,061
Escambia	93,566	65.30%	48,329	33.73%	1,383	0.97%	45,237	31.57%	143,278
Flagler	19,633	51.02%	18,578	48.28%	269	0.70%	1,055	2.74%	38,480
Franklin	3,472	58.54%	2,401	40.48%	58	0.98%	1,071	18.06%	5,931
Gadsden	6,253	29.80%	14,629	69.72%	102	0.49%	-8,376	-39.92%	20,984
Gilchrist	4,936	70.36%	2,017	28.75%	62	0.88%	2,919	41.61%	7,015
Glades	2,443	58.33%	1,718	41.02%	27	0.64%	725	17.31%	4,188
Gulf	4,805	66.03%	2,407	33.08%	65	0.89%	2,398	32.95%	7,277
Hamilton	2,792	54.97%	2,260	44.50%	27	0.53%	532	10.47%	5,079
Hardee	5,049	69.65%	2,149	29.65%	51	0.70%	2,900	40.00%	7,249
Hendry	5,757	58.90%	3,960	40.51%	58	0.59%	1,797	18.39%	9,775
Hernando	42,635	52.93%	37,187	46.17%	725	0.90%	5,448	6.76%	80,547
Highlands	25,878	62.36%	15,347	36.98%	271	0.65%	10,531	25.38%	41,496
Hillsborough	245,576	53.01%	214,132	46.23%	3,514	0.76%	31,444	6.78%	463,222
Holmes	6,412	77.25%	1,810	21.81%	78	0.94%	4,602	55.44%	8,300
Indian River	36,938	60.15%	23,956	39.01%	520	0.85%	12,982	21.14%	61,414
Jackson	12,122	61.20%	7,555	38.14%	130	0.66%	4,567	23.06%	19,807
Jefferson	3,298	44.10%	4,135	55.30%	45	0.60%	-837	-11.20%	7,478
Lafayette	2,460	73.98%	845	25.41%	20	0.60%	1,615	48.57%	3,325
Lake	74,389	60.02%	48,221	38.90%	1,340	1.08%	26,168	21.12%	123,950
Lee	144,176	59.91%	93,860	39.00%	2,631	1.09%	50,316	20.91%	240,667
Leon	51,615	37.85%	83,873	61.50%	891	0.65%	-32,258	-23.65%	136,379
Levy	10,410	62.52%	6,074	36.48%	168	1.01%	4,336	26.04%	16,652
Liberty	1,927	63.79%	1,070	35.42%	24	0.79%	857	28.37%	3,021
Madison	4,191	50.47%	4,050	48.77%	63	0.76%	141	1.70%	8,304
Manatee	81,318	56.62%	61,262	42.66%	1,041	0.72%	20,056	13.96%	143,621
Marion	81,283	58.19%	57,271	41.00%	1,123	0.80%	24,012	17.19%	139,677
Martin	41,362	57.09%	30,208	41.69%	883	1.22%	11,154	15.40%	72,453
Miami-Dade	361,095	46.61%	409,732	52.89%	3,899	0.50%	-48,637	-6.28%	774,726
Monroe	19,467	49.24%	19,654	49.71%	414	1.05%	-187	-0.47%	39,535
Nassau	23,783	72.64%	8,573	26.18%	387	1.18%	15,210	46.46%	32,743
Okaloosa	69,693	77.65%	19,368	21.58%	695	0.77%	50,325	56.07%	89,756
Okeechobee	6,978	57.24%	5,153	42.27%	59	0.48%	1,825	14.97%	12,190
Orange	192,539	49.62%	193,354	49.83%	2,151	0.55%	-815	-0.21%	388,044
Osceola	43,117	52.45%	38,633	47.00%	454	0.55%	4,484	5.45%	82,204
Palm Beach	212,688	39.05%	328,687	60.35%	3,247	0.60%	-115,999	-21.30%	544,622
Pasco	103,230	54.07%	84,749	44.39%	2,937	1.54%	18,481	9.68%	190,916
Pinellas	225,686	49.56%	225,460	49.51%	4,211	0.92%	226	0.05%	455,357
Polk	123,559	58.61%	86,009	40.80%	1,262	0.60%	37,550	17.81%	210,830
Putnam	18,311	59.12%	12,412	40.07%	250	0.81%	5,899	19.05%	30,973
St. Johns	59,196	68.60%	26,399	30.59%	695	0.81%	32,797	38.01%	86,290
St. Lucie	47,592	47.56%	51,835	51.80%	636	0.64%	-4,243	-4.24%	100,063
Santa Rosa	52,059	77.35%	14,659	21.78%	589	0.88%	37,400	55.57%	67,307
Sarasota	104,692	53.51%	88,442	45.20%	2,518	1.29%	16,250	8.31%	195,652
Seminole	108,172	58.10%	76,971	41.34%	1,052	0.56%	31,201	16.76%	186,195
Sumter	19,800	62.18%	11,584	36.38%	458	1.44%	8,216	25.80%	31,842
Suwannee	11,153	70.58%	4,522	28.62%	127	0.80%	6,631	41.96%	15,802
Taylor	5,467	63.71%	3,049	35.53%	65	0.76%	2,418	28.18%	8,581
Union	3,396	72.64%	1,251	26.76%	28	0.60%	2,145	45.88%	4,675
Volusia	111,924	48.89%	115,519	50.46%	1,496	0.65%	-3,595	-1.57%	228,939
Wakulla	6,777	57.61%	4,896	41.62%	90	0.77%	1,881	15.99%	11,763
Walton	17,555	73.22%	6,213	25.91%	208	0.87%	11,342	47.31%	23,976
Washington	7,369	71.09%	2,912	28.09%	85	0.82%	4,457	43.00%	10,366
Totals	3,964,522	52.10%	3,583,544	47.09%	61,744	0.81%	380,978	5.01%	7,609,810

==== Counties that flipped from Democratic to Republican ====
- Flagler (largest municipality: Palm Coast)
- Hernando (largest municipality: Spring Hill)
- Osceola (largest municipality: Kissimmee)
- Pasco (largest municipality: Wesley Chapel)
- Pinellas (largest municipality: St. Petersburg)

=== By congressional district ===
Bush won 18 of 25 congressional districts. Both candidates won a district held by the other party.

District	Bush	Kerry	Representative
1st	72%	28%	Jeff Miller
2nd	54%	46%	Allen Boyd
3rd	35%	65%	Corrine Brown
4th	69%	31%	Ander Crenshaw
5th	58%	41%	Ginny Brown-Waite
6th	61%	39%	Cliff Stearns
7th	57%	43%	John Mica
8th	55%	44%	Ric Keller
9th	57%	43%	Michael Bilirakis
10th	51%	49%	Bill Young
11th	41%	58%	Jim Davis
12th	58%	42%	Adam Putnam
13th	56%	44%	Katherine Harris
14th	62%	38%	Connie Mack IV
15th	57%	43%	Dave Weldon
16th	54%	46%	Mark Foley
17th	17%	83%	Kendrick Meek
18th	54%	46%	Ileana Ros-Lehtinen
19th	34%	66%	Peter Deutsch
20th	36%	64%	Debbie Wasserman Schultz
21st	57%	43%	Lincoln Diaz-Balart
22nd	48%	52%	Clay Shaw
23rd	24%	76%	Alcee Hastings
24th	55%	45%	Tom Feeney
25th	56%	44%	Mario Diaz-Balart

== Electors ==
Technically the voters of Florida cast their ballots for electors: representatives to the Electoral College. Florida is allocated 27 electors because it has 25 congressional districts and 2 senators. All candidates who appear on the ballot or qualify to receive write-in votes must submit a list of 27 electors, who pledge to vote for their candidate and his or her running mate. Whoever wins the majority of votes in the state is awarded all 27 electoral votes. Their chosen electors then vote for president and vice president. Although electors are pledged to their candidate and running mate, they are not obligated to vote for them. An elector who votes for someone other than his or her candidate is known as a faithless elector.

The electors of each state and the District of Columbia met on December 13, 2004, to cast their votes for president and vice president. The Electoral College itself never meets as one body. Instead the electors from each state and the District of Columbia met in their respective capitols.

The following were the members of the Electoral College from Florida. All were pledged to and voted for George W. Bush and Dick Cheney.

1. Al Austin
2. Allan Bense
3. Sally Bradshaw
4. Al Cardenas
5. Jennifer Carroll
6. Armando Codina
7. Sharon Day
8. Maria de la Milera
9. Jim Dozier
10. David Griffin
11. Fran Hancock
12. Cynthia Handley
13. William Harrison
14. Al Hoffman
15. Bill Jordan
16. Tom Lee
17. Randall McElheney
18. Jeanne McIntosh
19. Nancy Mihm
20. Gary Morse
21. Marilyn Paul
22. Tom Petway
23. Sergio Pino
24. John Thrasher
25. Janet Westling
26. Robert Woody
27. Zach Zachariah
