= Mid-Hudson Children's Museum =

Coordinates: 41°42′31″N 73°56′20″W

Mid-Hudson Discovery Museum

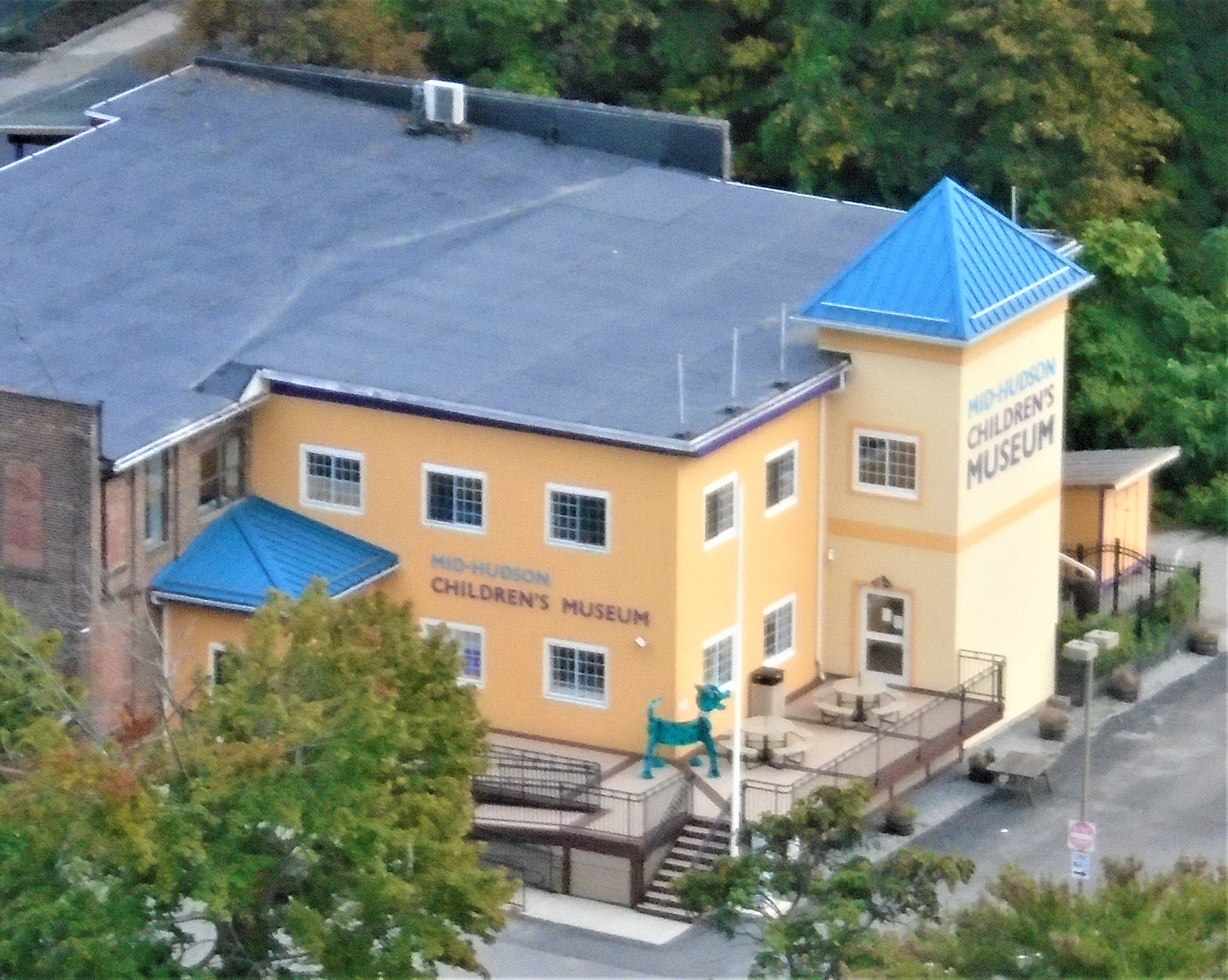
- Museum building
- Former name: Mid-Hudson Children's Museum
- Established: 1989
- Location: 75 North Water Street, Poughkeepsie, NY
- Type: Children's Museum
- Visitors: ~80,000 annually
- Executive director: Jeffery Sasson
- Public transit access: Poughkeepsie, Metro-North Hudson Line
- Website: mhdm.org

The Mid-Hudson Discovery Museum (MHDM) is a children's museum in the Hudson River Valley between the larger New York City and Albany markets. It was formerly known as the Mid-Hudson Children's Museum, until the range of children it serves was extended to age 12 in 2022.

The Mid-Hudson Discovery Museum is an independent 501(c)(3) not-for-profit educational organization that is supported by admission and membership sales, program fees, donations, and grants. MHDM is a member of the American Alliance of Museums (AAM), the Association of Children's Museums (ACM), the Association of Science-Technology Centers (ASTC), and the Museum Association of New York (MANY). It receives nearly 80,000 visitors a year. The board of directors of MHDM is composed of volunteers.

Founded in 1989 by a group of individuals in Poughkeepsie, the Mid-Hudson Children's Museum operated in donated spaces in the City of Poughkeepsie and then in the South Hills Mall for many years. In 2002, it moved to its current home at 75 North Water Street. The building is a mid-19th century industrial brick building that is across the street from the Innis Dye Works. This location, on the banks of the Hudson River, is only a short walk to a 21-story elevator that goes up to the Walkway over the Hudson, a linear state park that was once a railroad bridge. Major upgrades to the MHDM facility were made in 2015 and 2016, which included the creation of a new Science Center and an outdoor Children's Garden.

Visitors to the Mid-Hudson Discovery Museum pay a $14.50 general admission (as of 2024), with children under one being free. The museum offers discounts for American military personnel with identification, and EBT or SNAP cardholders. MHDM also offers annual memberships for frequent visitors.

== Partnerships ==
MHDM works with multiple supporters and partners for various promotions, expansion, and exhibit work.

=== Dyson Foundation ===
In 2010, the Dyson Foundation, a Hudson Valley organization that works to improve people's lives through grant funding, promoting philanthropy, and strengthening the capacity of nonprofit organizations, took the unusual step of purchasing the Museum building. This action allowed the foundation to cement MHDM's permanent home on the waterfront, while continuing to provide general operating support. Additional recent funding supported installation of an elevator to bring the facility into ADA compliance, and accommodate visitors with disabilities and elderly guests accompanying their grandchildren. A Management Assistance Program mini-grant supported professional staff development and strategic planning.

=== Agency Pass/Corporate Membership Program ===
The Agency Pass Program and the Corporate Membership Program are opportunities for local businesses and agencies to purchase memberships for employees and wards.

== Exhibits ==
The museum has five main attractions, with multiple exhibits in each. The Early Learning Junction (ELJ) is geared towards children aged 0–4, and focuses on school-readiness. Toddlers improve motor skills, cognitive functions, literacy, and social and emotional development.

Imagination Playground is an open-ended exhibit with giant, toddler-size foam blocks for children to build and play with.

Rivertown is another staple of the museum. The attraction allows patrons to enter MHDM's very own miniature town featuring a fire station, kitchen, construction site, and more. This attraction focuses on cognitive development and immersive play.

The Science Center @ MHDM opened in 2016. It is dedicated to boosting critical thinking skills through early STEM education for children ages 0–12. Popular exhibits include the Wonderdome, an exploration of the science of light, and Lift-and-Link, a collection of different building materials for children to experiment with.

The most recent attraction is Science Revealed!, a part of the 2022 re-branding campaign. With this addition to the museum, MHDM officially expanded its capacity to teach by including exhibits for children up to age 12. It features 16 custom-made, hands-on science exhibits that invite visitors into full-body physical exploration of motion, air, forces, fluids and magnetism.

=== Poughkeepsie Waterfront Market ===
In 2017, MHDM launched the Poughkeepsie Waterfront Market – a public farmers market bringing farm fresh produce to City of Poughkeepsie families, residents and visitors. The Market operates Tuesday afternoons in the Pavilion at MHDM from 2:00 pm – 5:30 pm, seasonally May through October.

== Outreach ==
The Mid-Hudson Discovery Museum offers hands-on programming to help children explore the world around them, practice skills and learn new things. MHDM also offers field trip opportunities for students in grades PreK - 5 to learn in a real-world environment, experience things first-hand, engage their senses, and bolster their critical thinking skills. Museum field trips are approximately 2.5 hours in length and on held on days when the museum is closed to the public. MHDM offers two types of field trips; Explorer, where classes engage with exhibits at their own pace, and Discovery, where classes additionally work on a STEM-based prompt in correlation with NYS Science and NGSS Standards.

MHDM also does outreach programming for schools, libraries, and other organizations in the nearby area.
