= Fall Kill =

Creek in Dutchess County, New York, United States

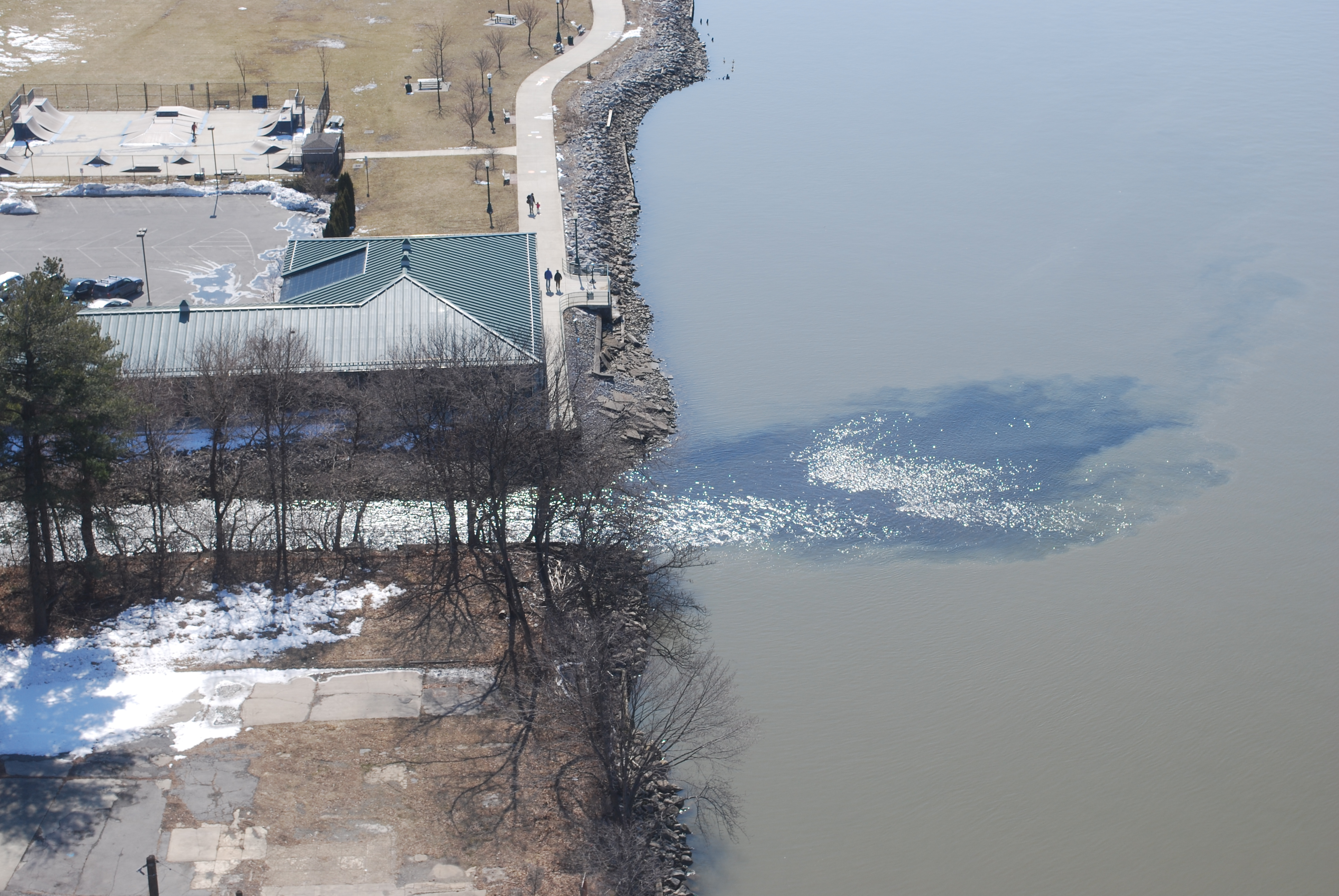
- Fall Kill draining into the Hudson River, as seen from the Walkway over the Hudson

- Location of the mouth of the Fall Kill in New York State Fall Kill (the United States)

Location
- Country: United States
- State: New York
- County: Dutchess County
- City: Poughkeepsie

Physical characteristics
- Source
  - location: Town of Clinton
  - coordinates: 41°50′43″N 73°52′24″W
- Mouth: Hudson River
  - location: City of Poughkeepsie
  - coordinates: 41°42′33″N 73°56′25″W
- Length: 38 mi (61 km)
- Basin size: 19.5 sq mi (51 km^{2})

The Fall Kill is a creek in Dutchess County, New York, United States. The stream is approximately 38 miles (61 km) long, and joins the Hudson River in the city of Poughkeepsie.

== Course ==
The creek begins in the towns of Hyde Park and Clinton, flows southward through the town and city of Poughkeepsie, and drains into the Hudson River. The creek's drainage basin accounts for approximately 12,476 acres (19.5 sq mi; 50.5 km^{2}) of the larger Hudson Direct Watershed. As of the 2000 Census, about 28,500 people resided in this area.

Although the northern section of the creek is characterized by marshes and wetlands harboring several threatened or endangered species, the southern end of the creek is surrounded by heavy urbanization. In the city of Poughkeepsie, 2.5 miles (4.0 km) of the Fall Kill were channelized by stone walls during the Great Depression.

The Innis Dye Works building, dating to the 1830s, abuts the creek several hundred feet from its confluence with the Hudson River. The creek was an important source of industrial water power in the early 19th century, such as grinding materials to make dyes.

The New York State Department of Environmental Conservation designates the creek as a "Class C" stream, meaning it is suitable for fishing. The Fall Kill is also a third order stream by the time it reaches the Hudson River.

== See also ==
- List of rivers of New York
