= Innis Dye Works =

Historic factory in Poughkeepsie, New York, U.S.

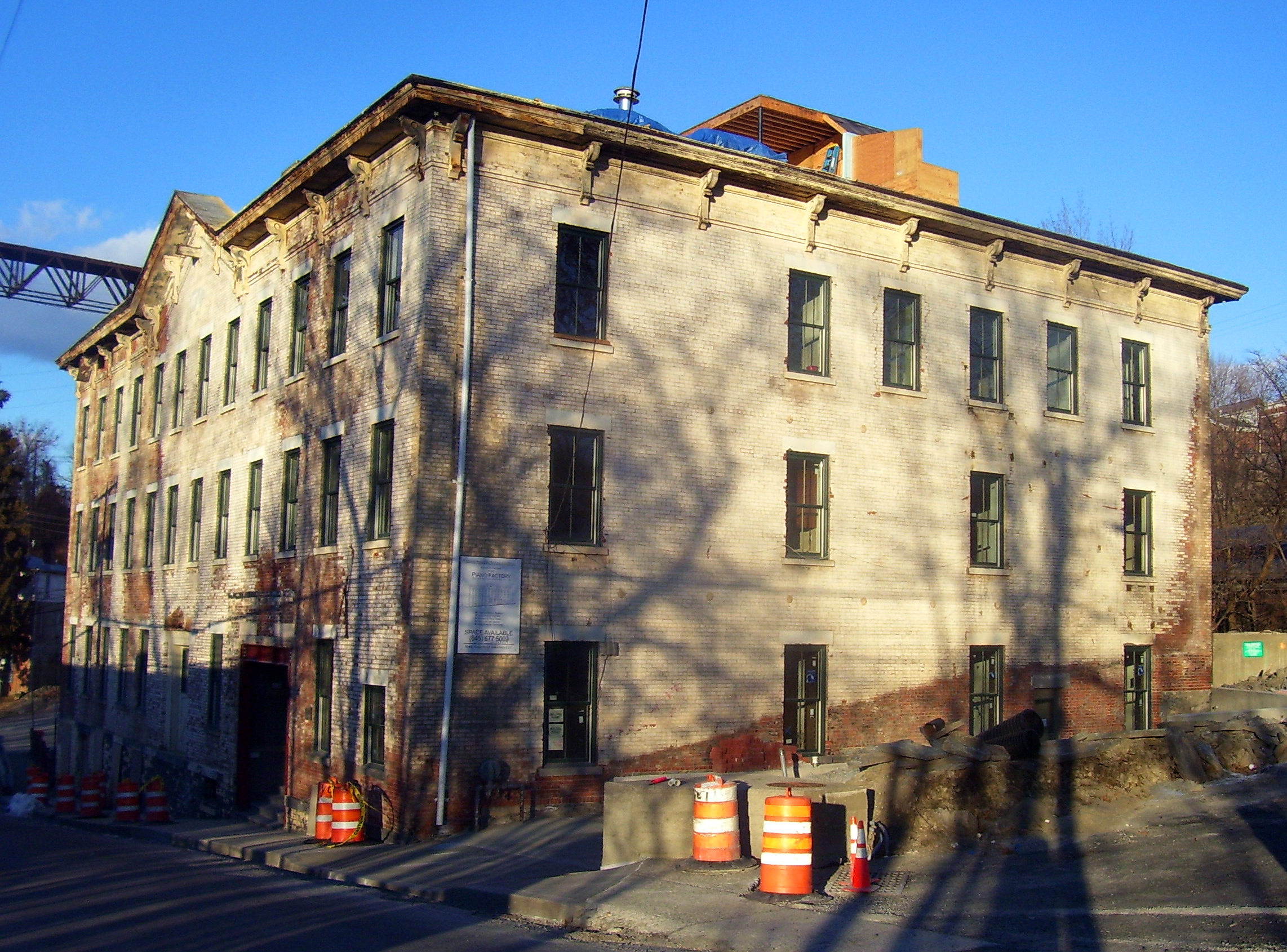
- Front elevation and south profile, with ongoing restoration efforts, 2008
- Interactive map of Innis Dye Works
- 41°42′32″N 73°56′18″W
- Location: 80 North Water Street, Poughkeepsie, New York

History
- Built: 1880

The former Innis Dye Works factory is located along North Water Street in Poughkeepsie, New York, United States, on a triangular lot between the street, Fall Kill and the railroad tracks of the Metro-North Hudson Line, just across from the Mid-Hudson Discovery Museum. It has served a variety of industrial functions, and remains in good condition today.

It is a three-story, twelve-bay structure with a raised basement. At the roofline is a projecting cornice and frieze with large carved brackets. A triangular pediment in the center gives the year of its construction, 1880. There is a wooden hoist at the center of the second story and the main entrance is a double door with vertical planking.

The Innis Dye Works company dates to at least the 1830s. The first record of its existence, in 1838, is founder Aaron Innis's transfer of the company to his son George, later a three-time mayor of the city. The building itself was used for pulverizing and storage of materials to be made into dyes. It is shown on an 1887 map of the city.

At the end of the century the building outlived its original purpose when the traditional dye industry gave way to aniline-based mixtures. By 1913 it would be reused as the David H. Schmidt Piano Hammer factory, whose name is still visible on the facade between the second and third stories. It was converted back to dyemaking again by 1934; since then it has been used as a warehouse. It was nominated for listing on the National Register of Historic Places in 1982, consistent with the requirements for listing described in a 1980 study of historic resources in Poughkeepsie, and it received NRHP reference number 82005072, but was not in fact listed due to owner's objection.

In 2008, it underwent conversion into condominiums.
