= Terry Parker High School =

American public high school

Coordinates: 30.341896°N 81.574990°W

Location
- 7301 Parker School Road; Jacksonville, Florida 32211; USA

Information
- Type: Public school
- Motto: "Be Brave, Dream Big."
- Established: Land donated by H. Terry Parker in 1955 and opened Fall 1956 with first class graduating June, 1957
- Principal: Robert Hudson
- Staff: 65.00 (FTE)
- Enrollment: 1,411 (2023–2024)
- Student to teacher ratio: 21.71
- Campus: Suburban
- Colors: Red █ & Black █
- Mascot: Brave
- Nickname: Terry Parker, Parker, or TP

Terry Parker High School is a public high school in the Duval County Public School district, located in Jacksonville, Florida. The school celebrated its 50th anniversary in 2005. The school has been named a Blue Ribbon School of Excellence.

== Namesake ==
In 1955, philanthropist H. Terry Parker and his family deeded 30 acres (120,000 m^{2}) of property in Arlington for the erection of a public school in the Duval County area. The Arlington Parent-Teachers Association nominated Parker to be the school's namesake and it was approved by the school board.

In 1958, Parker made a gift of one half the cost of seating and lighting installations at Parker Athletic Field. Sixty red and black wool uniforms were given to Terry Parker Band by Mrs. Parker.

== Improvement ==
Terry Parker was one of 11 schools nationwide selected by the College Board for inclusion in the EXCELerator School Improvement Model program beginning the 2006–2007 school year. The project was funded by the Bill & Melinda Gates Foundation.

== Swimming pool ==
The school has an outdoor pool which is used by the athletic teams and physical education classes during the academic year; then it becomes a free public pool operated by the City of Jacksonville Parks & Recreation Department during the summer months.

== Hall of Fame ==
Thirty Terry Parker High School graduates, former teachers and former staff members were inducted into the school's inaugural Hall of Fame as part of the school's 50th anniversary festivities April 1, 2005. Inductees were selected on the basis of their exemplary achievements in athletics, health and medicine, arts and entertainment, public service, business and industry, volunteerism, philanthropy or education.

Terry Parker Hall of Fame
Name	Year	Attribute			
Aaron Staton	1998	Actor (broadway and television) and writer. Known for playing the best and most honorable man, Kenneth Cosgrove, on AMC's popular series Mad Men.			
Joe Adeeb	1971	Jacksonville business owner, Bono's Bar-B-Q			
Mike Atter	1972	Jacksonville attorney, charitable organizer, volunteer			
Wayne Bailey	faculty	Parker High choral director, 1972–1980; music educator, conductor, vocalist			
Josiah Bartley	1968	Parker teacher, Duval County public schools administrator			
Don Brewer	1958	Jacksonville business owner, former Jacksonville city councilman			
Robert Brewer	1965	1972 U.S. Olympic Team, youth track-and-field leader			
Aaron H. Brown, Jr.	faculty	Parker's first head football coach and athletic director, 1956–1964			
Catherine Buck Whatley	1968	Jacksonville business owner, president of the National Association of Realtors			
Rick Catlett	1969	President of the Gator Bowl Association			
Leanza Cornett Steines	1989	Miss America 1993, television host and performer			
John Delaney	1974	Mayor of Jacksonville, 1995–2003; president, University of North Florida			
Dan Disch	1977	high school and college football coach			
Sidney Friend	school administrator	Parker's first principal, 1956–1969			
Ward Green	1965	Parker band director, 1975–2004			
Adam Hollingsworth	1986	Jacksonville businessman and political strategist			
Gary Iwanowski	1974	owner of Designer's Landscape Co., syndicated television host (Gary Alan)			
Scott Jones	1982	owner of Scott Jones School of Dance; dancer, choreographer			
Ivan Khatchoyan	1988	nominated musician with band |Cooking on Burners, owner CHOI |records	Joe Lippo	faculty	Parker band director, 1958–1976
Ian Mairs	1982	playwright, actor, director and teacher			
Howard May	faculty	1970–2002			
Rudy McKissick, Jr.	1983	pastor, Bethel Baptist Institutional Church			
Marilyn Olin	faculty	Parker teacher, 1972–1996; 2000 Duval County Teacher of the Year; mentor for National Board Certified Teachers			
Tom Petway	1958	Jacksonville business owner, business and civic leader			
Fred Pickard	faculty	Parker head football coach for 21 years			
Lake Ray, III	1974	President of Harbor Engineering, Jacksonville City Councilman, Current Florida State Legislator District 17			
Susan Thomson Shi	1967	Educator and administrator, community service volunteer, consultant in Greenville, S.C.			
Ray Veckruise	faculty	Parker's first choral director, 1956–1964; composer of Parker High's alma mater			
Eric Jon Veri	1988	musician, music and video producer	Susan Watt Cable	1967	School board president in Macon, Ga.; Georgia state legislator
Terry Wood	1965	former president, Jacksonville City Council			

Other notable Terry Parker graduates
Name	Year	Attribute
Danny Joe Brown	1969	songwriter and former lead singer for the band Molly Hatchet
Michael Clerc	1985	1984 FHSAA 4A State Champion in Cross-Country 3-mile at 15:05. School record holder in the mile with a 4:08.2.
Stephen Mosley	1994	Only 5,000 yard rusher in school history. He helped lead the Braves to two undefeated, 10–0, regular seasons in 1992 and 1993. (football)
Roosevelt Williams (gridiron football)	1997	NFL 3rd draftee by the Chicago Bears (2002, 2003), Cleveland Browns (2003, 2004), and New York Jets (2005)
A. J. Jenkins	2008	Former NFL Wide Receiver. First round pick (30th overall) of the San Francisco 49ers in the 2012 NFL Draft out of the University of Illinois.
Sam Barrington	2009	Former NFL Linebacker. Seventh round pick (232nd overall) of the Green Bay Packers in the 2013 NFL Draft out of the University of South Florida.
Ricardo Mathews	2010	Former NFL Defensive End. Seventh round pick (238th overall) of the Indianapolis Colts in the 2010 NFL Draft out of the University of Cincinnati.
