= Ricardo Mathews =

American football player (born 1987)

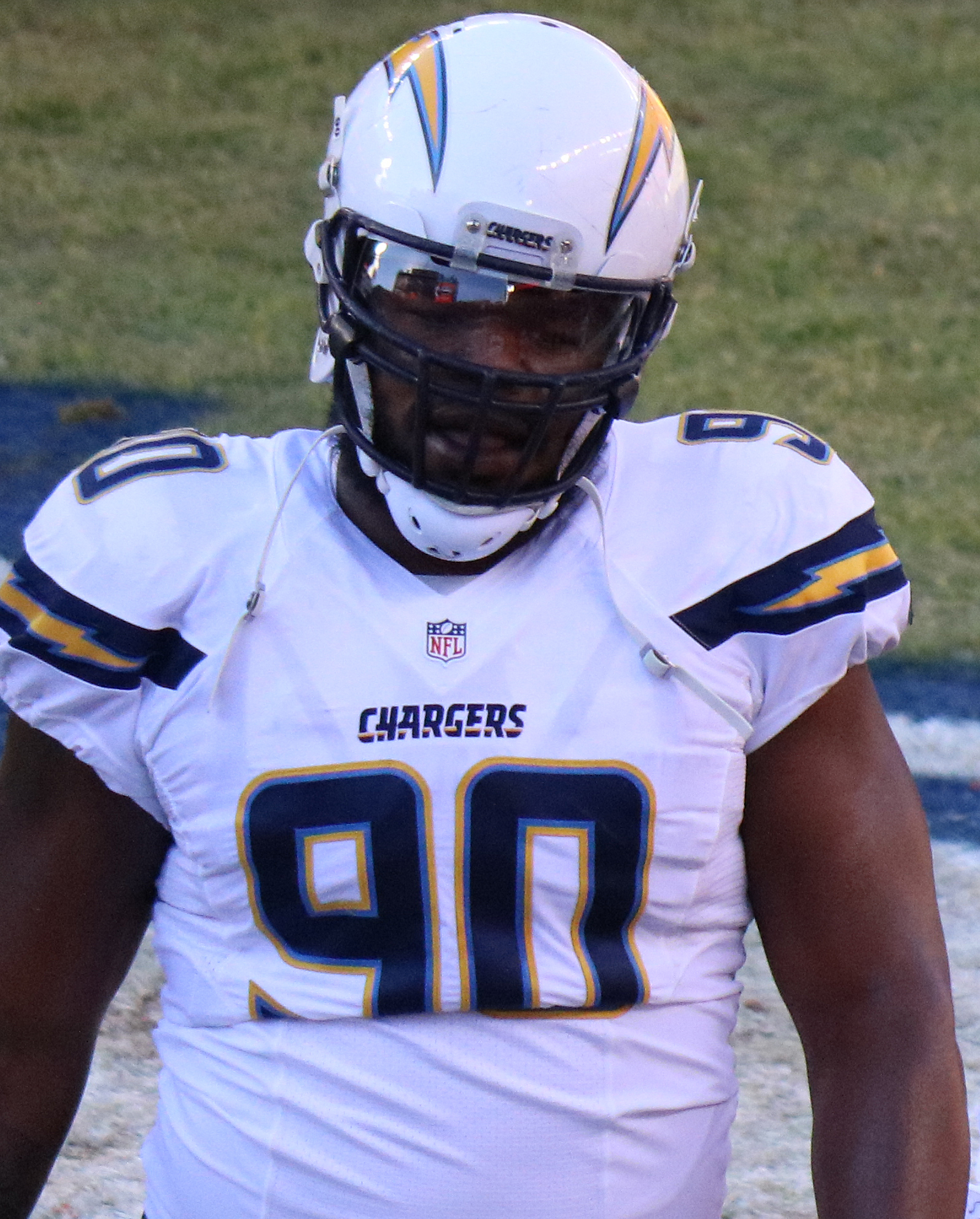
- Mathews with the San Diego Chargers in 2016

No. 91, 90
- Position: Defensive end

Personal information
- Born: July 30, 1987 (age 39); Jacksonville, Florida, U.S.
- Listed height: 6 ft 3 in (1.91 m)
- Listed weight: 294 lb (133 kg)

Career information
- High school: Terry Parker (Jacksonville)
- College: Cincinnati (2006–2009)
- NFL draft: 2010: 7th round, 238th overall pick

Career history
- Indianapolis Colts (2010–2013); Houston Texans (2014)*; San Diego Chargers (2014–2015); Pittsburgh Steelers (2016)
- * Offseason or practice squad member only

Awards and highlights
- Second-team All-Big East (2009)

Career NFL statistics
- Total tackles: 108
- Sacks: 5
- Forced fumbles: 2
- Stats at Pro Football Reference

Ricardo Eugene Mathews (born July 30, 1987) is an American former professional football player who was a defensive end in the National Football League (NFL). He was selected by the Indianapolis Colts in the seventh round of the 2010 NFL draft. He played college football for the Cincinnati Bearcats.

He was also a member of the Houston Texans, San Diego Chargers, and Pittsburgh Steelers.

== Early life and college ==
Mathews graduated from Jacksonville, Florida's Terry Parker High School and was a three time First-Team All Conference Selection for Terry Parker's football team. Ricardo was also a conference champion wrestler and made it to the Florida state championships in track.

Mathews played college football for the Cincinnati Bearcats.

== Professional career ==
Pre-draft measurables
Height	Weight	40-yard dash	10-yard split	20-yard split	20-yard shuttle	Three-cone drill	Vertical jump	Broad jump	Bench press
6 ft 2 in (1.88 m)	290 lb (132 kg)	4.95 s	1.69 s	2.85 s	4.51 s	7.30 s	31 1/2 in (0.80 m)	9 ft 6 in (2.90 m)	26 reps
All values from his Pro Day

=== Indianapolis Colts ===
==== 2010 ====
Mathews was selected in the seventh round (238th overall) by the Indianapolis Colts in the 2010 NFL draft. On July 29, 2010, the Indianapolis Colts signed Mathews to a four-year, $1.83 million contract.

He started his rookie season as the fifth defensive end on the Colts' depth chart behind Dwight Freeney, Robert Mathis, Eric Foster, and Fili Moala. On October 10, 2010, he made his regular-season debut with the Colts in a victory over the Kansas City Chiefs. In Week 10, he made his first career tackle during a 23–17 victory over the Cincinnati Bengals. He finished his rookie season with one tackle and appeared in eight games.

==== 2011 ====
During training camp and OTAs Mathews was switched from defensive end to defensive tackle when the Indianapolis Colts went from a 3–4 base defense to a 4–3. Mathews was released by the Colts during final team cuts on September 3, 2011. On September 5, 2011, he was signed to the Colts' practice squad. On September 11, 2011, the Colts waived him from their practice squad. On October 5, 2011, the Colts signed Mathews to the active roster after Eric Foster suffered an injury.

He played in his first game of 2011 during the Colts' Week 5 match-up against the Kansas City Chiefs. Mathews made two solo tackles and deflected two passes in the 28–24 loss. On October 30, 2011, Mathews had three tackles and made his first career sack on Matt Hasselbeck, as the Colts lost, 27–10, to the Tennessee Titans and fell to 0–8. On January 1, 2011, he had his best statistical game of the season, compiling a season-high five tackles in a 19-13 loss to the Jacksonville Jaguars.

==== 2012 ====
During the 2012 off-season, the Indianapolis Colts fired head coach Jim Caldwell and hired Chuck Pagano in his place. Defensive coordinator Greg Manusky implemented a 3–4 defensive base, moving Mathews back to defensive end, his original position. Although he played in the first two regular-season contests, he did not record a tackle until Week 3 against the Jacksonville Jaguars. On October 21, 2012, he received his first career start and made one tackle during a 17–13 win over the Cleveland Browns. On December 2, 2012, Mathews made a season-high three combined tackles during a 35–33 victory over the Detroit Lions. In his third season with the Colts, he made 13 total tackles and one pass deflection while playing in 15 games and starting five of them.

==== 2013 ====
In the 2013 season, he made two tackles in the season-opening victory over the Oakland Raiders. On December 15, 2013, Mathews collected two solo tackles in a 25–3 victory over the Houston Texans. The next game, he was credited with half a sack and made two combined tackles during the Colts' 23–7 win at the Kansas City Chiefs. He finished the 2013 season with 18 combined tackles, a pass deflection, and half a sack in 16 games and one start. The Indianapolis Colts finished with an 11–5 record and made the playoffs.

On January 4, 2014, Mathews played in his first career playoff game and made two combined tackles in a 45–44 wild-card victory over the Kansas City Chiefs. The following game, he made three solo tackles in a 43–22 loss to the New England Patriots.

With the Colts, he recorded 51 tackles and 1.5 sacks and played in 52 games with six starts.

=== Houston Texans ===
On April 15, 2014, the Houston Texans signed Mathews to a one-year, $730,000 contract. He was released by the Texans during final roster cuts on August 30, 2014.

=== San Diego Chargers ===
==== 2014 ====
Mathews was signed by the San Diego Chargers on September 1, 2014. He began the regular season as the fourth defensive end on the Chargers' depth chart behind Kendall Reyes, Corey Liuget, and Tenny Palepoi. On September 28, 2014, he made his Chargers debut, recording a sack and two tackles in a 33–14 victory over the Jacksonville Jaguars. On October 5, 2014, Mathews collected two solo tackles and forced the first fumble of his career in a 31–0 win over the New York Jets.

During a Week 8 match-up at the Denver Broncos, Mathews recorded three solo tackles in the Chargers' victory. The next game, he received his first start with the Chargers and finished with two solo tackles in the 0–37 loss to the Miami Dolphins. On December 20, 2014, Mathews and Dwight Freeney sacked Colin Kaepernick, forcing a fumble which led to a recovery and touchdown by Corey Liuget. Mathews finished the 2014 season with career-high stats, recording 1.5 sacks, two forced fumbles, and 21 tackles in 12 games and two starts.

==== 2015 ====
On March 10, 2015, the Chargers signed him to a one-year, $960,000 contract that included a signing bonus of $155,000.

On October 4, 2015, Mathews received his first official start of the season and made one solo tackle in 30–27 victory over the Cleveland Browns. The following game, he made two combined tackles and sacked Pittsburgh Steelers' quarterback Ben Roethlisberger during the Chargers' 20–24 loss. In Week 7, he collected a season-high three solo tackles against the Oakland Raiders. He finished his last season with the Chargers with a total of 22 combined tackles and one sack in 16 regular- season contests and seven starts.

=== Pittsburgh Steelers ===
On March 31, 2016, the Pittsburgh Steelers signed Mathews to a one-year, $760,000 contract. He started the regular season as the third defensive end on the depth chart behind Cameron Heyward and Stephon Tuitt.

Although he played in the Steelers' season opener, Mathews did not make a tackle until the second week of the season against the Cincinnati Bengals. He finished the 24–16 win with only one combined tackle. On October 16, 2016, he received his first official start of the season but did not register a statistic against the Miami Dolphins. The following game, he received his second consecutive start and had two combined tackles in a 27–16 loss to the New England Patriots. On December 4, 2016, Mathews made two combined tackles and sacked New York Giants quarterback Eli Manning for his first sack of the season during the Steelers' 24–14 victory.
