= Corey Liuget =

American football player and coach (born 1990)

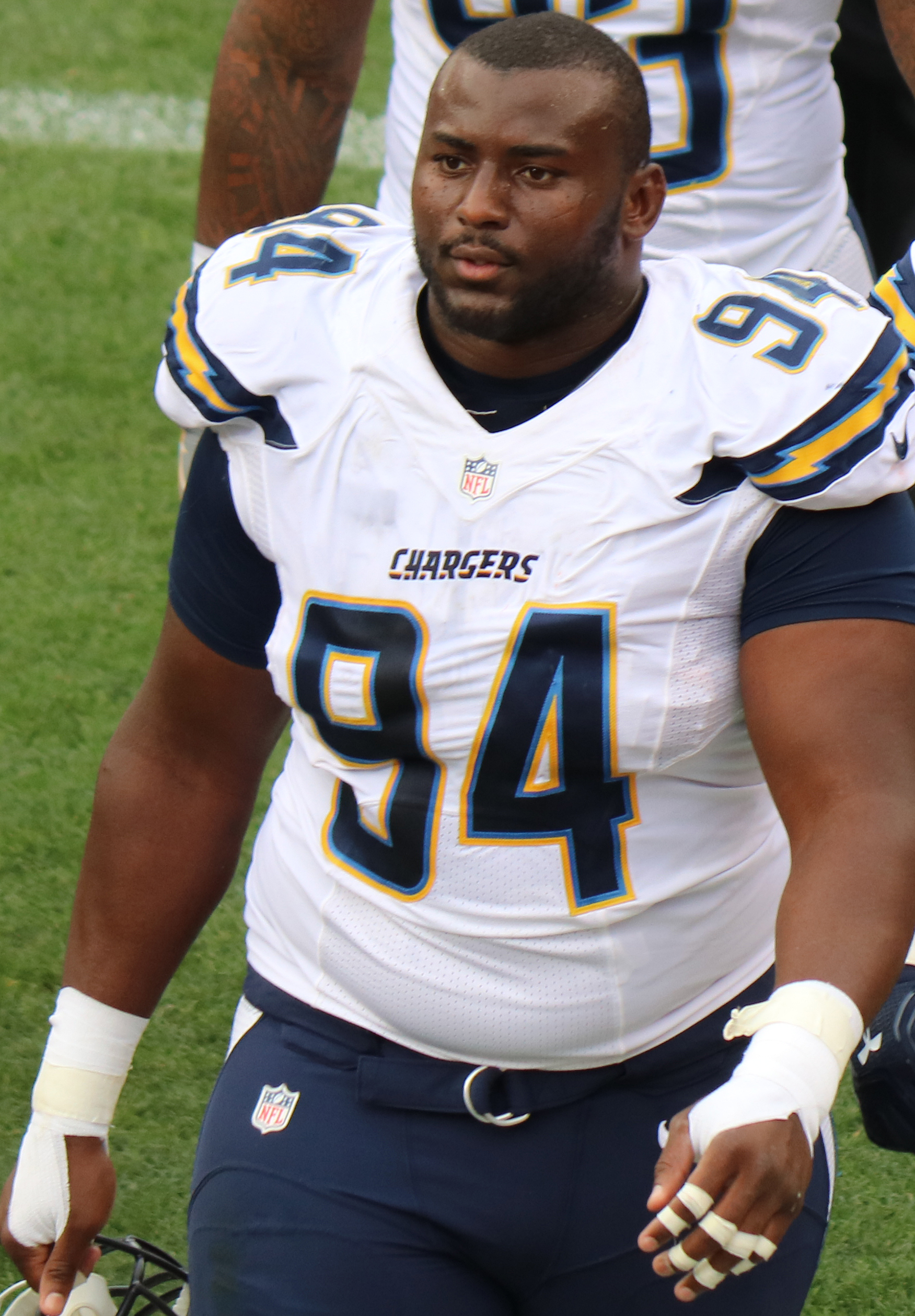
- Liuget with the Los Angeles Chargers in 2016

Personal information
- Born: March 18, 1990 (age 36); Miami, Florida, U.S.
- Listed height: 6 ft 2 in (1.88 m)
- Listed weight: 300 lb (136 kg)

Career information
- High school: Hialeah (Hialeah, Florida)
- College: Illinois (2008–2010)
- NFL draft: 2011: 1st round, 18th overall pick

Career history

Playing
- San Diego / Los Angeles Chargers (2011–2018); Oakland Raiders (2019); Buffalo Bills (2019); Houston Texans (2020)

Coaching
- Maryland (2024) Defensive assistant; Maryland (2025) Defensive line coach

Awards and highlights
- Second-team All-Big Ten (2010)

Career NFL statistics
- Total tackles: 291
- Sacks: 26.0
- Forced fumbles: 5
- Fumble recoveries: 6
- Pass deflections: 20
- Defensive touchdowns: 1
- Stats at Pro Football Reference

Corey Devon Liuget (born March 18, 1990) is an American former professional football player who was a defensive tackle in the National Football League (NFL). He played college football for the Illinois Fighting Illini, and was selected by the San Diego Chargers in the first round of the 2011 NFL draft.

== College career ==
During his three-year Illinois career, Liuget had 125 tackles, 25.5 TFLs and 8.5 sacks Liuget had a career year in 2010, earning Second-team All-Big Ten accolades after recording 63 tackles, 12.5 tackles for loss, 4.5 sacks, 10 quarterback hurries and three passes broken up. In 2009, he played in all 12 games, making four starts. In 2008, he ranked fifth in the Big Ten in fumbles recovered and played in 11 games and started two at defensive tackle as a true-freshman.

After his junior season, Liuget announced that he would forgo his senior season and enter the 2011 NFL draft.

== Professional career ==
Pre-draft measurables
Height	Weight	Arm length	Hand span	Wingspan	40-yard dash	10-yard split	20-yard split	20-yard shuttle	Three-cone drill	Vertical jump	Broad jump	Bench press
6 ft 2 1/8 in (1.88 m)	298 lb (135 kg)	33 1/4 in (0.84 m)	9 1/2 in (0.24 m)	6 ft 7 5/8 in (2.02 m)	5.00 s	1.75 s	2.87 s	4.68 s	7.48 s	27.5 in (0.70 m)	8 ft 6 in (2.59 m)	27 reps
All values from NFL Combine

=== San Diego / Los Angeles Chargers ===
Liuget was selected in the first round as the 18th overall pick by the San Diego Chargers.

In his rookie season, Liuget played in 15 games, including 13 starts, and recorded 19 total tackles, one sack, and one forced fumble. The team's first-round pick in the 2011 NFL Draft, Liuget had to grow up in a hurry as the NFL Lockout wiped out what would have been his first offseason. Instead of working out with teammates and studying with coaches, Liuget was forced to work alone. When the lockout ended and the season rolled around, injuries hammered the Chargers' defensive line and the young rookie was pressed into immediate duty.

In 2012, Liuget had a breakout season: the 2nd year man started all 16 games and had a tremendous impact on the Chargers defense.

Liuget went on to lead San Diego's defensive line in sacks (7), tackles (61), tackles for loss (15) and passes defended (9) in 2012, and his nine passes defended were second in the NFL among defensive linemen behind Houston's J. J. Watt's 15. Liuget's improved conditioning also contributed to a strong finish to the season as he tallied five sacks in the team's last six games, including a career-high two in the Chargers' December 23 win over the New York Jets. At the end of the season, he was named Chargers Defensive Player of Year (David Griggs Memorial Award). He was also on USA Today's All-Joe team.

In 2013, Liuget went on to lead the defense with 5.5 sacks. He also added 42 tackles, 2 passes defended, 1 field goal blocked, and a forced fumble.

In the 2014 season, Liuget got his first NFL touchdown against the San Francisco 49ers after recovering a fumble forced by Dwight Freeney and Ricardo Mathews. Liuget finished the season with 4.5 sacks 57 tackles, 2 passes defended, and 2 forced fumbles.

Liuget signed a five-year, $58.5 million extension with the Chargers, with $30 million guaranteed on June 9, 2015. On December 12, 2015, he was placed on injured reserve.

On March 23, 2018, Liuget was suspended four games due to a PED violation. In Week 11, Liuget suffered a torn quad tendon and was ruled out for the season. He was placed on injured reserve on November 21, 2018.

On February 13, 2019, the Chargers declined the option on Liuget's contract, making him a free agent.

=== Oakland Raiders ===
On August 25, 2019, Liuget signed with the Oakland Raiders. He was released on October 30, 2019.

=== Buffalo Bills ===
On November 5, 2019, Liuget was signed by the Buffalo Bills.

=== Houston Texans ===
On September 28, 2020, Liuget was signed to the Houston Texans practice squad. He was elevated to the active roster on November 7, November 14, and November 25 for the team's weeks 9, 10, and 12 games against the Jacksonville Jaguars, Cleveland Browns, and Detroit Lions, and reverted to the practice squad after each game. He was promoted to the active roster on December 2, 2020. Liuget was waived on December 21, 2020.

=== Retirement ===
On October 22, 2022, Liuget signed a one day contract to retire as a member of the Los Angeles Chargers.

=== NFL statistics ===
Year	Team	GP	COMB	TOTAL	AST	SACK	FF	FR	FR YDS	INT	IR YDS	AVG IR	LNG	TD	PD
2011	SD	15	19	14	5	1.0	1	1	0	0	0	0	0	0	2
2012	SD	16	51	36	15	7.0	1	1	0	0	0	0	0	0	9
2013	SD	16	42	32	10	5.5	1	0	0	0	0	0	0	0	2
2014	SD	16	57	45	12	4.5	2	2	0	0	0	0	0	1	2
2015	SD	11	34	28	6	3.0	0	0	0	0	0	0	0	0	0
2016	SD	16	36	28	8	0.0	0	1	0	0	0	0	0	0	3
2017	LAC	12	21	15	6	1.5	1	0	0	0	0	0	0	0	2
2018	LAC	6	14	9	5	1.5	0	1	0	0	0	0	0	0	0
2020	HOU	6	1	4	2	2	2	2	0	0	0	0	0	0	0
Career		114	275	211	69	26	8	8	0	0	0	0	0	0	0

== Coaching career ==
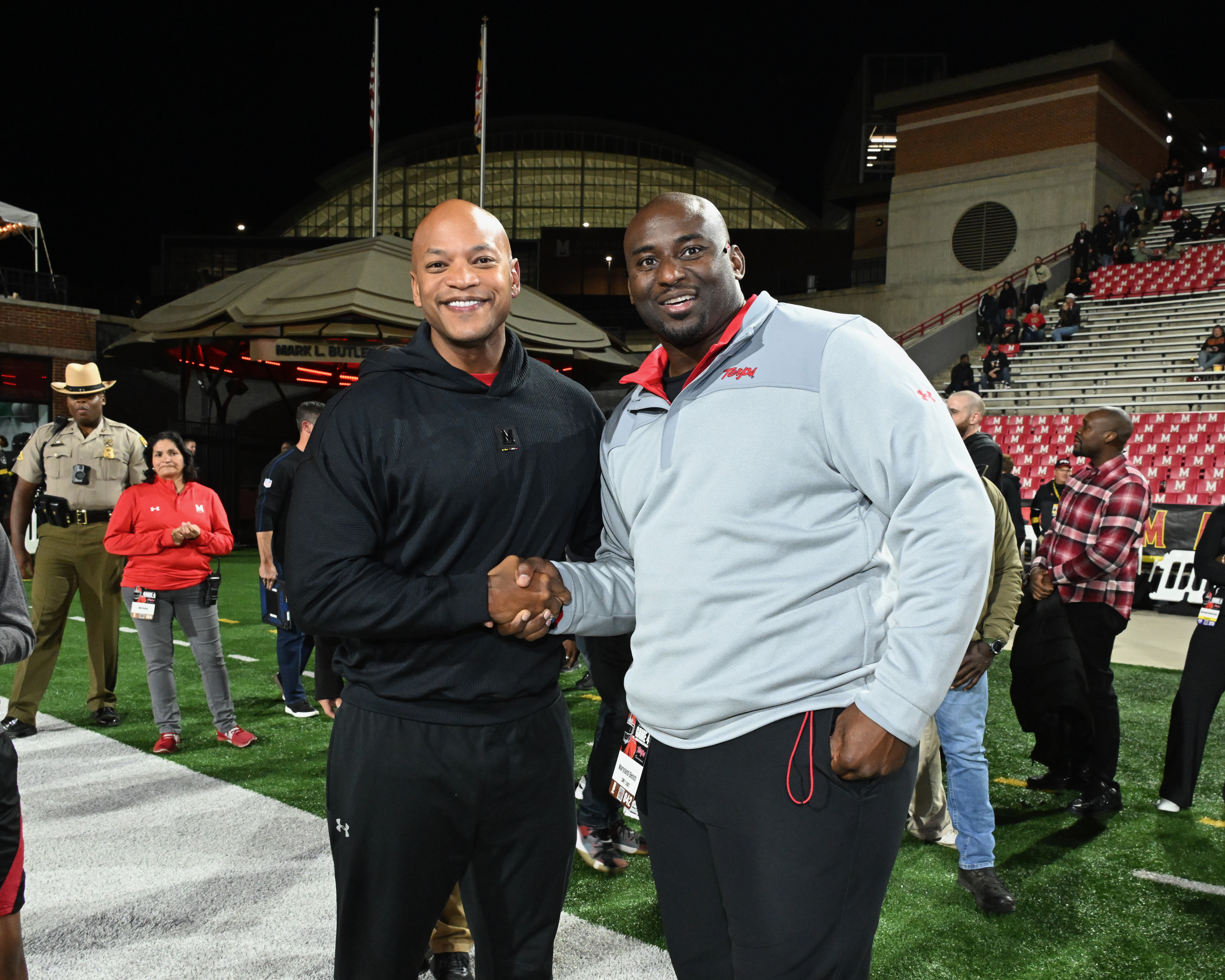
Liuget shakes hands with Maryland governor Wes Moore, 2024

In 2024, Liuget was hired as a defensive assistant for the Maryland Terrapins.

On February 27, 2025, Liuget was promoted as the defensive line coach.

== Personal life ==
Liuget is of Haitian descent. He was raised by his mother, as his father was killed when he went back to visit his grandmother in Haiti.
