= Roosevelt Williams (gridiron football) =

American football player and coach (born 1978)

No. 20, 27
- Title: Cornerback

Personal information
- Born: September 10, 1978 (age 48); Jacksonville, Florida, U.S.
- Listed height: 6 ft 1 in (1.85 m)
- Listed weight: 207 lb (94 kg)

Career information
- Position: Cornerback (No. 20, 27)
- High school: Terry Parker (Jacksonville)
- College: Savannah State (1998–1999); Tuskegee (2000–2001)
- NFL draft: 2002: 3rd round, 72nd overall pick

Career history

Playing
- Chicago Bears (2002–2003); Denver Broncos (2003); Cleveland Browns (2003–2004); Washington Redskins (2005)*; New York Jets (2005)*; Edmonton Elks (2006)
- * Offseason or practice squad member only

Coaching
- Widener (2010–2011) Defensive backs coach & special teams coordinator; Southwest Baptist (2012) Defensive backs coach; Seton Hill (2013) Defensive coordinator; Webber International (2014) Defensive backs coach; Lincoln (PA) (2015–2016) Defensive coordinator; ASA Miami (2018) Associate head coach & defensive coordinator; ASA Miami (2019) Head coach; Hardin–Simmons (2020–2023) Defensive backs coach; Houston Christian (2024) Cornerbacks coach; New York Jets (2025) Defensive assistant

Career NFL statistics
- Total tackles: 34
- Fumble recoveries: 2
- Pass deflections: 3
- Stats at Pro Football Reference

Head coaching record
- Career: NJCAA: 7–3 (.700)

Roosevelt Williams, Jr. (born September 10, 1978) is an American former professional football player and coach who was a cornerback in the National Football League (NFL). He most recently served as a defensive assistant for the New York Jets. He was selected by the Chicago Bears in the third round of the 2002 NFL draft. He played college football at Tuskegee University.

== Early life ==
Roosevelt stayed in the crime-infested housing projects on the East side of Jacksonville, where he and NFL running back Leon Washington were neighbors. Roosevelt decided to attend Terry Parker High School in Jacksonville, Florida, which was 15 miles from his neighborhood. Williams felt the transition would keep him on focus and out of trouble. At Parker High School, he lettered in football, basketball and track.

== College career ==
Williams attended Tuskegee University after transferring from Savannah State University. At Tuskegee, he was considered one of the top five cornerbacks in the nation for the upcoming 2002 NFL draft. He was invited to the NFL Combine, Senior Bowl and the East-West Shrine Bowl and decided to participate in the NFL Combine and Senior Bowl in which he was named starter at the All-Star Game. He was also arguably considered the best collegiate defender in the state of Alabama in 2002. Williams made All-American and first team all-Southern Intercollegiate Athletic Conference (SIAC) all of his four years playing at Tuskegee and Savannah State.

== Professional career ==
=== Chicago Bears ===
Williams was selected 72nd overall in the third round of the 2002 NFL draft. The pick used was obtained by the Bears from the Dallas Cowboys. Due to a nagging ankle injury he suffered in training camp, Williams played 7 games in his rookie season starting in three. Week 13 Chicago missed a big opportunity on the last play of the half. Packers QB Brett Favre threw a hail mary pass at the end of the half that was intercepted by Bears SS Damon Moore. Moore fumbled the ball to Packers lineman Mike Wahle, who subsequently fumbled it again to Williams. Packers rookie receiver Javon Walker chased Williams down and tackled him short of the end zone to end the half. Bears CB R. W. McQuarters had a chance to make the block but attempted to position himself for a lateral instead, allowing Walker to make the tackle at the 11-yard line to end the first half. The wild play made headlines in the Chicago daily news, ESPN, and the Pardon the Interruption show when sports columnist Michael Wilbon criticized R. W. McQuarters for such a selfish act that caused Williams not to score. Week 14 Williams made his first start against the AFC champions the New York Jets and was the player of the game that stop the Jets from progressing to the 2002 playoffs.

=== Denver Broncos ===
Williams was claimed off waivers from the Denver Broncos. The Broncos made room for Williams by cutting third-string quarterback Danny Kanell leaving just two quarterbacks on the Broncos roster. Week 3 against the San Diego Chargers starting quarterback Jake Plummer injured his shoulder during a Chargers sack which resulted in the release of Williams to make room for another quarterback. A couple days after the release, Williams was picked up by the Cleveland Browns.

=== Cleveland Browns ===
Williams played in a total of 12 games for the Browns starting in 3. With the Browns Williams was on a secondary unit that were ranked #3 in pass defense and #10 in total defense. In week 13 Cleveland Browns faced the Denver Broncos which was considered the game of the week that went in overtime. Williams finished that game with 8 tackles and a couple of pass break ups.

== Coaching career ==
In 2019, Williams was appointed the head football coach at ASA College in Hialeah, Florida.

On February 11, 2025, the New York Jets hired Williams to serve as a defensive assistant. On January 23, 2026, Williams was fired by the Jets.

== Personal life ==
His oldest son Deontai played at Nebraska and signed as an undrafted free agent with the Seattle Seahawks in 2022. He is currently with the BC Lions of the Canadian Football League (CFL).

== Head coaching record ==
Year	Team	Overall	Conference	Standing	Bowl/playoffs
ASA Miami Silver Storm (NJCAA independent) (2019)
2019	ASA Miami	7–3			
ASA Miami:		7–3			
Total:		7–3			
