= DeVoe L. Moore University Center =

Group of buildings at Florida State University

General information
- Status: Active
- Architectural style: Collegiate Gothic
- Location: UC-A: 282 CHAMPIONS WAY Tallahassee, Florida; UC-B: 288 CHAMPIONS WAY; UC-C: 296 CHAMPIONS WAY; UC-D: 403 STADIUM DR
- Coordinates: UC-A: 30.438973°N 84.302229°W; UC-B: 30.436868°N 84.302919°W; UC-C: 30.437515°N 84.30552°W; UC-D: 30.438818°N 84.30609°W
- Construction started: UC-A: 1992; UC-B: 1994; UC-C: 1995; UC-D: 1998
- Completed: UC-A: 1994; UC-B: 1997; UC-C: 1997; UC-D: 2002
- Owner: Florida State University Board of Trustees

Technical details
- Floor count: UC-A: 8 floors; UC-B: 7 floors; UC-C: 9 floors; UC-D: 4 floors
- Floor area: UC-A: 251,758 sq ft (23,389.1 m^{2}); UC-B: 83,457 sq ft (7,753.4 m^{2}); UC-C: 264,531 sq ft (24,575.7 m^{2}); UC-D: 212,336 sq ft (19,726.7 m^{2})
- Lifts/elevators: UC-A: 5; UC-B: 9; UC-C: 4; UC-D: 4

Design and construction
- Architects: Barnett Fronczak Barlowe & Shuler Architects
- Developer: Florida State University
- Main contractor: Culpepper Construction Company

References
- 600,000 SF $100,000,000 1999-23 Phases over Five Years

The DeVoe L. Moore University Center is a group of four brick buildings that surround Doak Campbell Stadium at the southwest corner of the campus of Florida State University. As the name suggests, the 800,000 ft^{2} complex is the hub of administrative, athletic and booster activities. The brick facade around the stadium matches the architectural design of most of the buildings on the university's campus. Planning and funding began under President Sliger in the early 1990s and construction lasted almost 20 years at a cost of hundreds of millions. Campbell stadium with the University Center "is the second largest continuous brick structure in the world (the first being the Great Wall of China) and the 49th largest stadium in the world."

== Dedication ==
The center was named for Devoe L. Moore, an automobile entrepreneur, real estate developer and longtime benefactor of FSU.

The stadium is part of the University Center complex, a mixed-use facility encompassing FSU Athletics, university office space, university classrooms, the university's Visitor Center, souvenir store, The University Center Club, and skyboxes and press boxes for use during football games. The buildings are numbered University Center "A/0233" (east), "B/0234" (south), "C/0235" (west) and "D/0236" (north). In common usage, the name is shortened to just the initials "UC" and the building identifier (A-B-C-D).

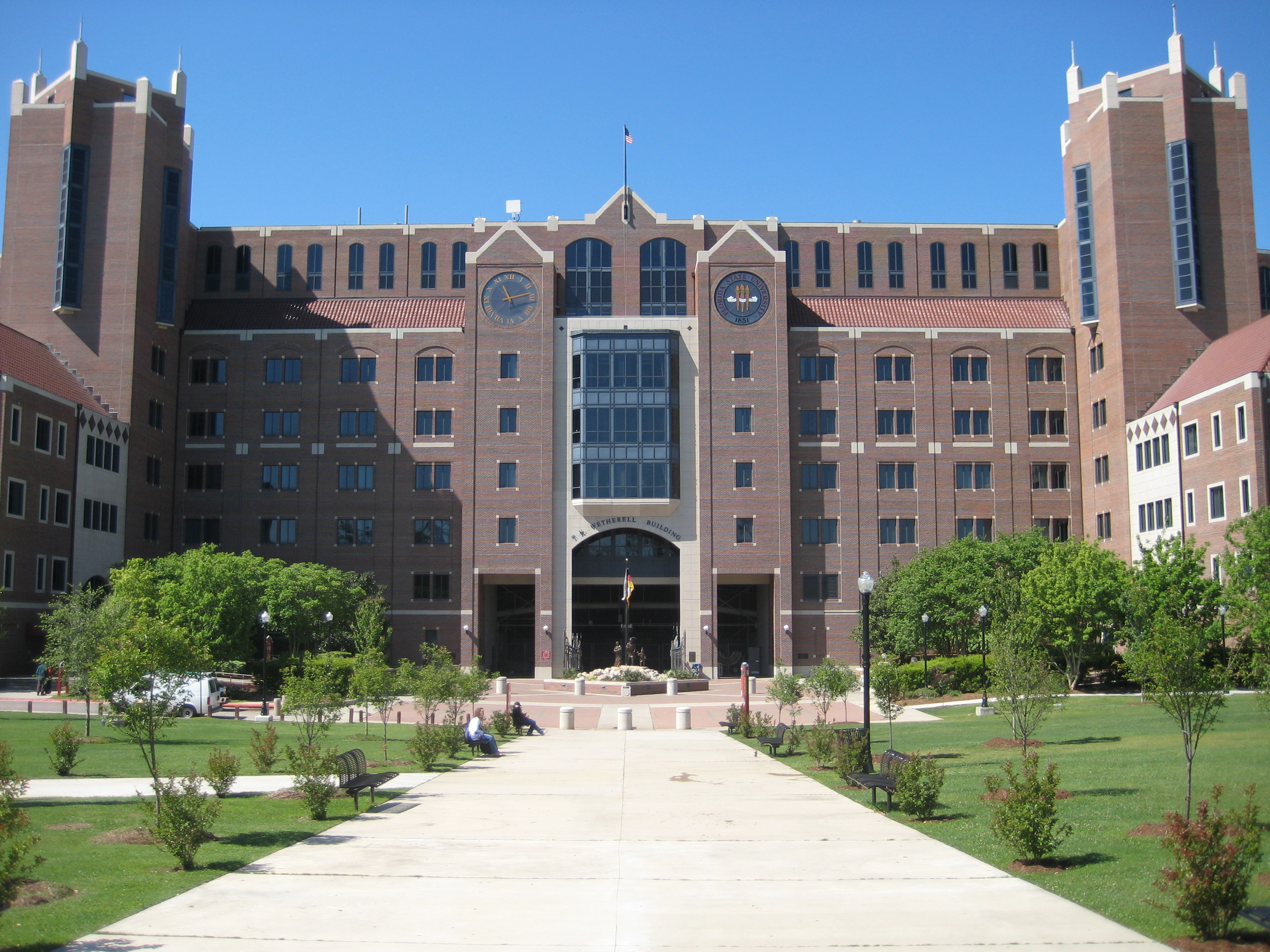
T. K. Wetherell building

== UC-A ==
Building "A" was constructed in 1994 and officially dedicated as the T.K. Wetherell Building. Procurement Services and Student Business Services take up one side of level one, while the College of Motion Picture Arts (CMPA) occupies the other side, plus the second level. The remainder of level two has the Office of Admissions, Auditor general and Controller. The Office of the Registrar is on the third level, together with Academic Publications, the Academic Center for Excellence and the Office of Undergraduate Studies. Most of the fourth level is the Dean of Students, but there is space for Office of Financial Aid and the Student Veterans Center. International Programs is on level five, plus FSU's Payables & Disbursements, Payroll and Travel departments. CMPA uses some space here, also. The Human resources department occupies most of level six with room for Cash Management, Financial Reporting, Accounting and Property Services. Booster Skyboxes are on levels seven and eight.

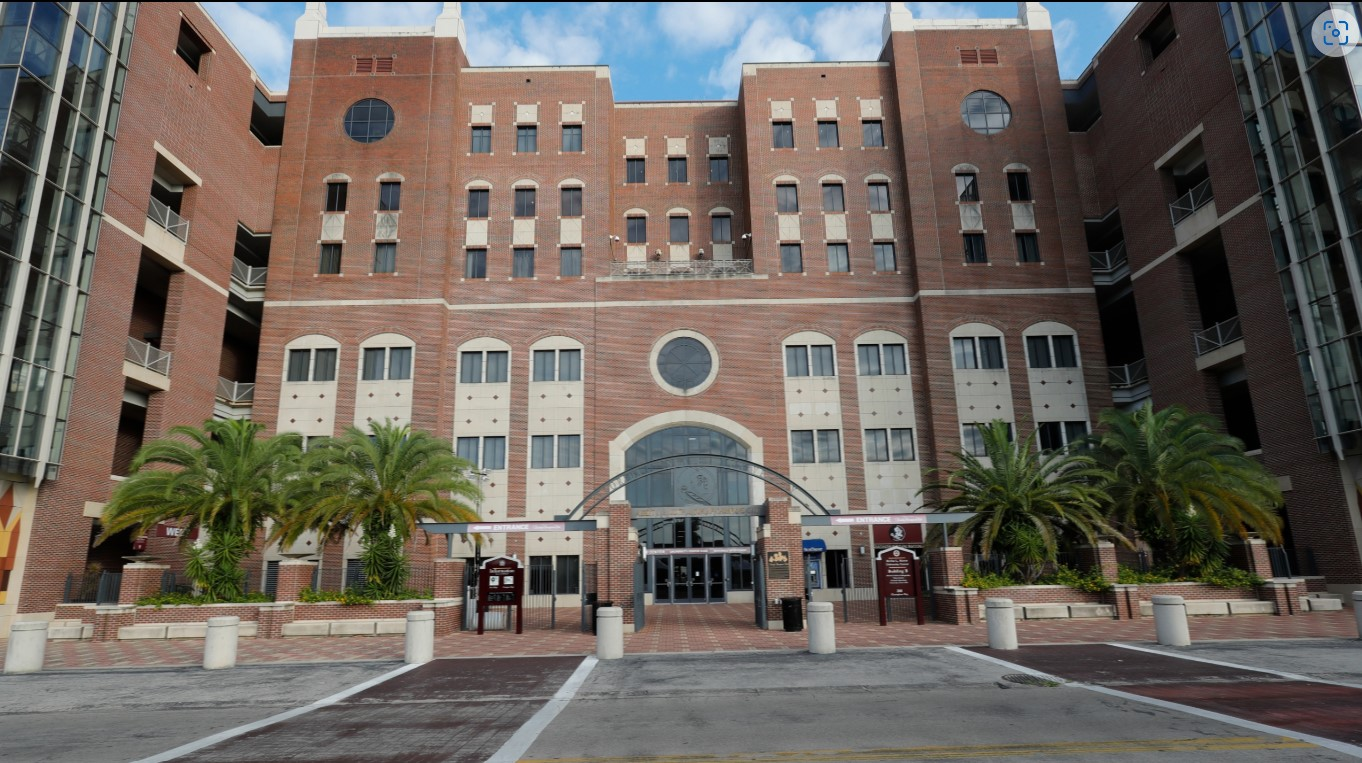
University Center B

== UC-B ==
The smallest in University Center, building "B" is located behind the south endzone. Visitor Services and the Seminole Sportshop are on the first level. The Dedman College of Hospitality's academic affairs offices, student center, and classrooms occupy the second level. The third level contains the Tom & Ginny Futch Ballroom. The Dedman College's administrative and faculty offices and Steiner Conference Room are on level four, with the Hospitality Food Lab on the 5th. The Kearney Osceola Grille takes up the entire sixth level. The Dunlap Champions Club was added as a seventh level; the "B" is also the only building without Skyboxes.

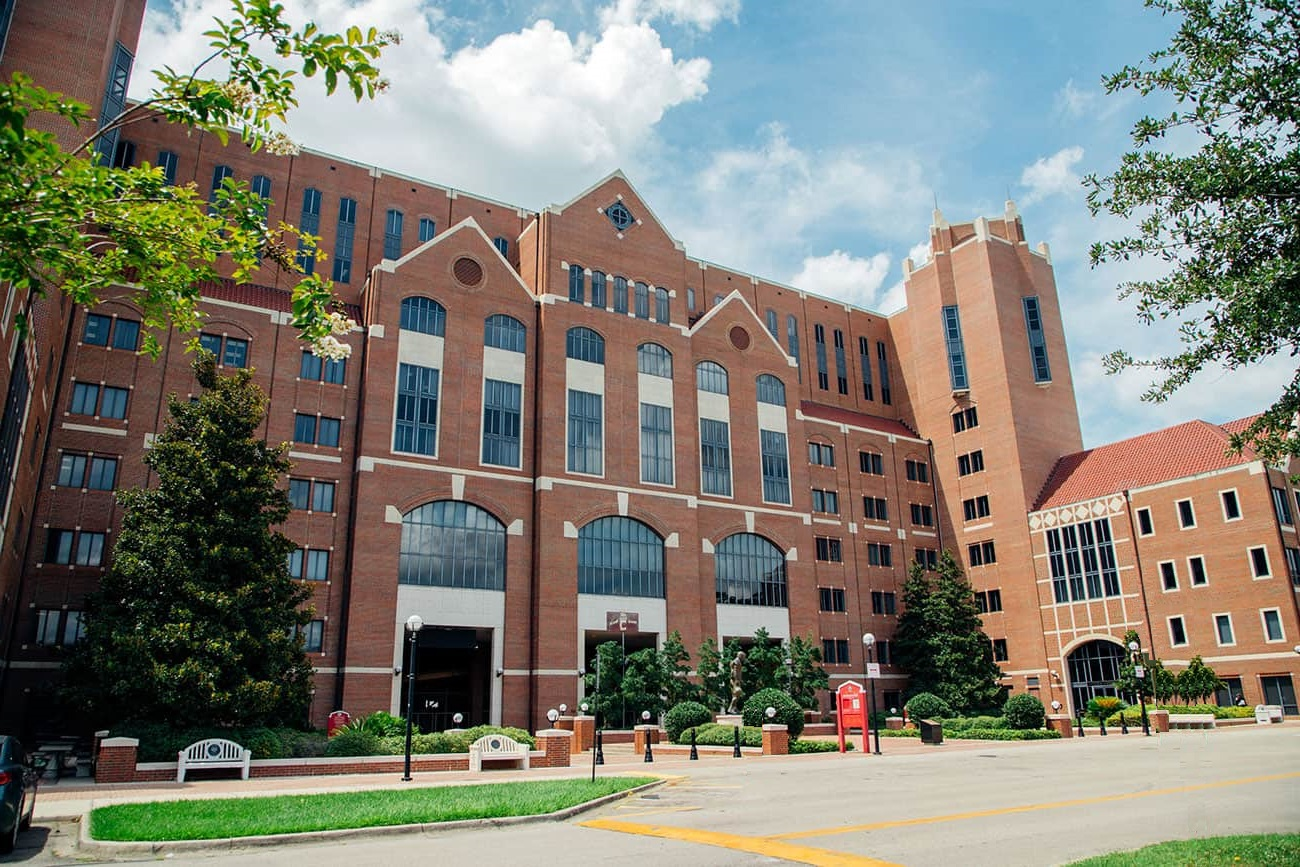
University Center C

== UC-C ==
Building "C" is the tallest in University Center at nine levels and was completed in 1996. The Seminole Ticket Office is on the first level, along with the FSU Testing Center and the Public Safety First Aid center. The College of Social Work has classrooms and offices on the 1st, 2nd & 3rd levels. The Office of Distance Learning has offices on the second and third level. The School of Communication is on the third level, and the College of Communication and Information is on the fourth level. Miller Hall is on the third and fourth levels, while Learning Systems Institute is on the fourth level. Level five is utilized by Seminole Boosters. IT Services and Information Security & Privacy Operations are on the sixth level. The President's Skybox is on level seven, along with Skyboxes on both seven and level eight. The Coach's Skybox is on level eight, and the Press box is the only occupant of level nine.

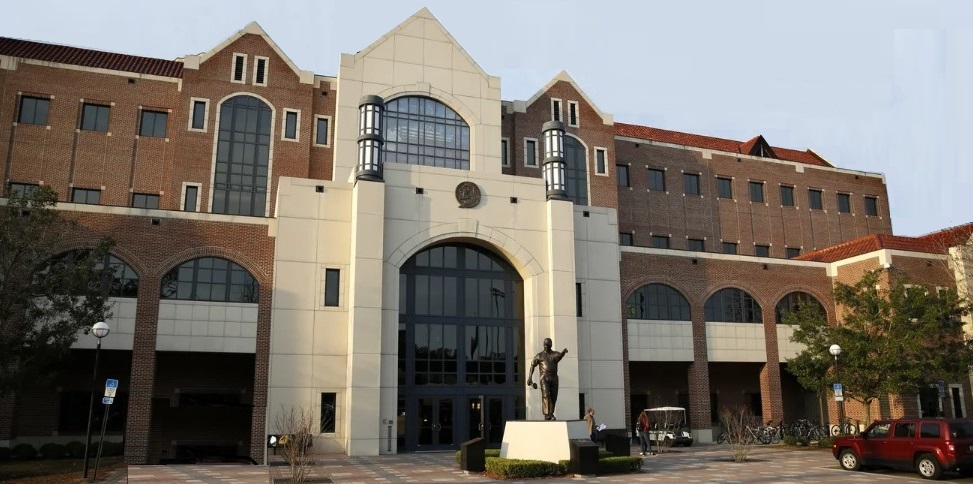
Coyle Moore Athletic Center

== UC-D ==
The 3-story 1950s Coyle Moore Athletic Center was razed in 2002-2003 and building "D" replaced it. It is the shortest with just 4 levels, but it still contains the Coyle Moore Athletic Center and is situated behind the north endzone. The first level contains football lockers, weight rooms, Sports medicine and training center, and the Figg Player's Dining Room (one of only three All-you-can-eat restaurants on campus). The Athletic auditorium occupies an area on the first and second level. Also on the second level is an athletic academic support computer lab, the FSU Sports Information Center, Seminole Productions, and Marketing and promotion offices. The third level contains coaching offices, facility and event management, and academic support. The Varsity Club, composed of former letter-winning athletes, has reserved seats on the third and fourth levels at one end, while Skyboxes are at the other end.

== See also ==
- Florida State University
- History of Florida State University
