= Bernard F. Sliger =

American economist and college president

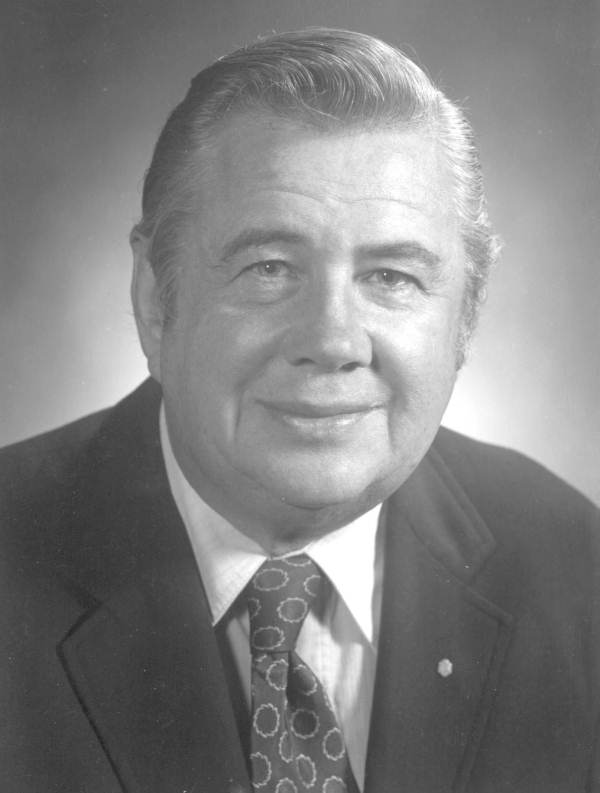

President Emeritus of Florida State University
- In office 1976–1991
- Preceded by: J. Stanley Marshall
- Succeeded by: Dale W. Lick

Personal details
- Born: September 30, 1924 Chassell Township, Houghton County, Michigan
- Died: October 10, 2007 (aged 83) Marquette, Michigan
- Party: Democratic
- Spouse: Greta Taube (m. 1945)
- Children: 4, including Nan, Paul, Greta & Sten
- Education: Michigan State University (BEc, MEc, PhD)
- Occupation: American economist College President
- Known for: Expanding Florida State University

Bernard Francis Sliger (September 30, 1924 – October 10, 2007) was an American educator and economist. He served as president of Florida State University for 15 years, from 1976 to 1991.

== Early life ==
Sliger was born September 30, 1924, in Chassell Township, Houghton County, Michigan, a small community in Michigan's Upper Peninsula. He was the eldest of three children of Hazel and Paul Sliger. His father was a logging foreman before working as a stonemason for the Civilian Conservation Corps in 1940. Sliger met his future wife at school and married Ruth Margareta (Greta) Taube September 1, 1945, in his wife's hometown of Newberry, Michigan. Sliger grew up in Trout Creek, Michigan, and earned a bachelor's, master's and doctorate—all from Michigan State University and all in economics. He began his career in education during 1947 as a teacher for Interior Township Schools.

== Career ==
He worked 19 years as an administrator and faculty member at LSU. During that time, he headed the economics department, was graduate council chairman, vice chancellor and academic affairs dean. He was Louisiana's Secretary of Administration for a year. In that role he approved the Louisiana Superdome construction project. He then formed the Louisiana Coordinating Council for Higher Education, and served from 1969 to 1972 as its executive director.

A scholar and economist in the specialized field of public finance and economic theory, he frequently consulted with organizations and commissions. Sliger served from 1976 to 1977 as chairman of the Florida Economic Advisory Council for Governor Reubin Askew and from 1986 to 1988 he served on an Academic Task Force to review Insurance & Tort System in Florida. In Louisiana, he was chief consultant of the Governor's 1968 Tax Study Committee and was chairman of a special committee to evaluate the Louisiana Department of Revenue.

== FSU ==
The Sligers moved from Baton Rouge to Tallahassee in 1972 when Bernie was hired as FSU's executive vice president and provost. When J. Stanley Marshall resigned in August 1976, he was named interim president and the interim was removed in February 1977.

Sliger's talents were also recognized by other colleges and institutions. He was considered for president at LSU in 1981, followed by the University of Houston in 1983. He interviewed twice for Major League Baseball commissioner in 1993, removing himself from consideration when Dale Lick resigned at FSU and he was asked to serve until a new president could be selected. Bud Selig got the job.

While president at FSU, he served for six years on the Board of Directors for the Federal Reserve Bank of Atlanta and seven years as a trustee for the American College Testing from 1981 to 1987, including chairman the last three years.

The NCAA appointed Sliger to the NCAA Presidents Commission for a term of four years beginning in 1987. He chaired four committees: National forum (1988), NCAA Division 1-A and Presidential Nominating Committee (1989), and NCAA Division 1 in 1990.

== Results ==
FSU's academic/facility accomplishments under President Sliger:

- Student enrollment rose by 38% from 21,000 to 29,000 students.
- The number of students winning National Merit Scholarships at FSU doubled to 150.
- The National Science Foundation moved the National High Magnetic Field Laboratory to FSU from the Massachusetts Institute of Technology.
- Acquired three supercomputers making FSU the fifth college in the nation to have a supercomputer.
- FAMU/FSU College of Engineering established.
- FSU-Panama City satellite campus was established.
- Initial funding for the University Center was approved.
- A College of Medicine at FSU was first discussed.

Florida State athletics soared while Sliger was president. He believed that a strong athletic program was part of college life on campus, so strong administrators were hired and sought coaches who could win with integrity. That philosophy became one of his prime directives in setting standards and providing direction from the Presidents Commission of the NCAA. Dr. Sliger was the commission's point-man during the movement for college sport reforms in the 1990s. Some academics thought Dr. Sliger overemphasized athletics, but Bernie knew that success in athletics would help raising money and making friends, and both happened.

FSU's athletic accomplishments under President Sliger:

- FSU became a member of the Atlantic Coast Conference.
- Women's sports experienced success as did non-revenue athletic programs on the national level
- The baseball team went to regional tournaments 14 times and were invited to five College World Series
- Coach Pat Kennedy was hired and FSU basketball had runs in the NCAA Tournament six times and went to the NIT twice.
- Bobby Bowden, hired in 1976, received two new contracts to stay at FSU where he coached two football championships
- Sliger the foresight to insist on a Buyout clause in Bobby Bowden's contracts, which effectively prevented another school from luring the coach away from FSU.
- FSU Football went to thirteen bowl games in 15 years bringing 11 ACC championships and winning nine straight bowl games with four consecutive top-four national finishes
- At the end of Dr. Sliger's term as interim president in 1994, the Seminoles won their first football national championship

== Fundraising ==
Perhaps Dr. Sliger's only weakness in his job as president was his dislike for selling or soliciting funds. He admitted it and told a story about picking berries when he was a child, but paying another kid to sell them. In 1986, Chancellor Charlie Reed of the Florida Board of Regents publicly criticized Bernie for his lackluster fund-raising. Sliger responded the following year with $13 million, compared to just over $8 million in 1986. Sliger eventually secured funding for 27 endowed professorships (called Eminent Scholar chairs), each requiring a $600,000 donation. FSU's first major campaign for capital gifts was initiated by Sliger.

== Post-retirement ==
Following his retirement as president, Sliger remained at FSU to help establish the Gus A. Stavros Center for the Advancement of Free Enterprise and Economic Education and serve as its first director. The Center teaches instructors how to teach economics. He also returned to teaching as an economics professor. Three years later, Dale Lick, who succeeded Sliger as president, resigned in September 1993 and Dr. Sliger was asked to return as interim president until a new search could be conducted. Sandy D'Alemberte was inducted as the 12th President in January 1994. Former president Sliger remained a presence at FSU ceremonies and athletic contests.

== Organizations ==
He held membership and leadership positions in numerous national educational organizations, including the Universities Research Association Executive Committee and Board of Trustees; Southeastern Universities Research Association; International Association of University Presidents; the Board of Trustees of the Joint Council on Economic Education; National Association of State Universities and Land Grant Colleges; American Council on Education, ACE Labor/Higher Education Council; Council on Competitiveness.

He served as a leader and member of various state & local organizations: the Tallahassee and Florida Chamber of Commerce; Florida TaxWatch; Florida Economics Club; Florida Council of 100; Florida Chapter of the Nature Conservancy (Board of Trustees & chairman, 1990–91); Florida Association of Colleges and Universities (Board of Directors). Other civic activities include Capital Tiger Bay Club, Tallahassee Kiwanis Club, and Springtime Tallahassee (Parade Grand Marshal in 1989).

== Health and death ==
In September 1993, Sliger experienced a stroke while surgeons were performing an open-heart procedure. Heart and liver problems landed him in the hospital for two weeks during March 2006. He and his wife retreated every summer to Munising, Michigan, where her family lived, and Trout Creek, Michigan, a tiny community in the Upper Peninsula where he spent his youth and loved forever. Bernie, Greta, their four children and eventually, eight grandchildren enjoyed time there.

In early October, the Sligers were vacationing in Michigan. Following a walk along the shore of Lake Superior, Bernie apparently had a stroke and did not regain consciousness. His health was in decline for over a year. In 2017, Mrs. Sliger was inducted with six other FSU first ladies into the Circle of Gold by the FSU Alumni Association.

== Memorials ==
- The Seminole Club of Miami endowed a $1,000 Bernie Sliger scholarship in 1991 to be awarded annually to a Miami-Dade County graduate enrolling at Florida State University.
- Dr. Sliger was inducted into the FSU Athletic Hall of Fame in 1992.
- Dr. Sliger was honored in 1997 with membership in the Ourso College of Business Hall of Distinction at Louisiana State University. Individuals have been recognized since 1996 that make "significant contributions in the areas of business, academia, or government as well as their community."
- The Bernard F. Sliger Award is the single highest honor given by the FSU Alumni Association beginning in 2005.
- Bernie and Greta were both honored in 2006 with the FSU Torch Award for Mores, honoring respect for customs, tradition and character.
- FSU Heritage Day in 2007 honored Dr. Sliger with a video tribute and a bronze statue was unveiled. At the ceremony, Sliger looked frail but gave a 5-minute speech, stating: "I really appreciate your coming out and paying me this honor I didn't deserve. I didn't do nearly as many good things as y'all have said I did today."
- An FSU Graduate and US Representative from Pennsylvania, Jason Altmire, read a tribute into the Congressional Record on October 15, 2007, honoring Dr. Bernard Sliger's years as president at FSU and service to the students.
- An endowed professorship was established at FSU for Dr. Bernard F. Sliger after his death.
