= Stella Cottrell =

British educationist

Stella Cottrell was formerly Director for Lifelong Learning at the University of Leeds and Pro-Vice-Chancellor for Learning, Teaching and Student Engagement at the University of East London, UK. She supports students from diverse backgrounds, such as those with dyslexia and mature, international and disabled students.

Her publications for staff and students have sold more than a million copies worldwide. First published in 1999, The Study Skills Handbook is now in its 6th edition. Stella has authored a number of study skills guides as part of the Macmillan Study Skills series including Critical Thinking Skills, Skills for Success and The Macmillan Student Planner (previously published as The Palgrave Student Planner).

In the June 2011 edition of Education Bookseller, Victor Glynn characterised Cottrell's books as "concise, clearly laid out and covering a wide range of subjects."

== List of publications ==
Title	Edition number	Format	ISBN	Publication date
The Study Skills Handbook	1	Paperback	9780333751893	12 August 1999
Teaching Study Skills and Supporting Learning	1	Paperback	9780333921241	7 September 2001
The Study Skills Handbook	2	Paperback	9781403911353	25 April 2003
Skills for Success	1	Paperback	9781403911322	2 May 2003
Critical Thinking Skills	1	Paperback	9781403996855	9 September 2005
The Study Stick	1	USB Flash drive	9780230516595	8 September 2006
The Exam Skills Handbook	1	Paperback	9780230506534	3 November 2006
The Study Skills Handbook	3	Paperback	9780230573055	22 February 2008
Skills for Success	2	Paperback	9780230250185	19 May 2010
Critical Thinking Skills	2	Paperback	9780230285293	11 May 2011
Study Skills Connected, with Neil Morris	1	Paperback	9781137019455	27 July 2012
You2Uni	1	Paperback	9781137022424	27 July 2012
The Study Skills Handbook	4	Paperback	9781137289254	9 April 2013
Dissertations and Project Reports	1	Paperback	9781137364265	10 January 2014
Skills for Success	3	Paperback	9781137426529	6 February 2015
Critical Thinking Skills	3	Paperback	9781137550507	14 March 2017
Mindfulness for Students	1	Paperback	9781352002355	11 May 2018
The Study Skills Handbook	5	Paperback	9781137610874	18 March 2019
50 Ways to Succeed as an International Student	1	Paperback	9781352005769	8 May 2019
50 Ways to Manage Stress	1	Paperback	9781352005790	8 May 2019
50 Ways to Boost Your Grades	1	Paperback	9781352005820	8 May 2019
50 Ways to Manage Time Effectively	1	Paperback	9781352005851	8 May 2019
50 Ways to Excel at Writing	1	Paperback	9781352005882	8 May 2019
50 Ways to Boost Your Employability	1	Paperback	9781352005912	8 May 2019
The Macmillan Student Planner 2020-21*	1	Spiral-bound	9781352010060	24 April 2020
The Study Skills Handbook	6	Paperback	9781350421271	11 July 2024

* First published as The Palgrave Student Planner 2005-6 and every year subsequently; rebranded as The Macmillan Student Planner in 2019–20.

== The Study Skills Handbook ==
The Study Skills Handbook was first published on 12 August 1999. The philosophy behind the book can be summarised as saying that most students could perform well in higher education with the right strategies, attitudes and pacing to suit their circumstances and previous educational background. Whether they were successful at study in the past or not, Stella contends that all students benefit from taking an individualised approach that suits them, as they are now, and looking with fresh eyes at each new challenge.

Critical self-reflection and active solution-seeking are emphasised throughout the book. Cottrell's aim is for students to personalise and contextualise strategies, rather than taking advice wholesale.

=== Themes ===
Prominent themes in The Study Skills Handbook include:

- Critical thinking
- Active, participatory learning
- Self-evaluation
- Personal reflection
- Personalised learning
- The importance of knowing how learning, intelligence and memory work
- Self-management and personal effectiveness
- Identifying your learning style
- Applying personal skills to academia and vice versa
- Shaping your degree for personal development and future employability

The book featured activities and self-evaluations as well as cartoons intended to appeal to visual learners. Customised editions of The Study Skills Handbook have been published for Queen's University Belfast, The University of East London, Middlesex University and Coventry University.

=== Subsequent development ===
The Study Skills Handbook was developed out of Stella Cottrell's experience of working with students. Subsequent editions have been developed using feedback from students and lecturers who have used the book. The current, fifth, edition of The Study Skills Handbook was published in 2019.

== The Lifelong Learning Centre ==
Stella Cottrell was appointed as Director of the Lifelong Learning Centre (LLC) in July 2005. On her appointment the University of Leeds reported her as saying, "This is absolutely the right time for the University to be looking at its social inclusion agenda, and to build on its current innovatory work with adult learners."

The objective of the centre is to deliver programmes and services that:

- Promote and support the development of part-time and mature undergraduate study at Leeds
- Support progression onto University of Leeds programmes for adults from groups under-represented in HE
- Ensure that part-time and mature students achieve and flourish at the University of Leeds.

== Philosophy ==
=== Critical thinking ===
According to Cottrell, students are likely to have difficulty engaging in critical analysis if:

- they lack adequate knowledge of the subject
- they have poor reading skills, or vocabulary
- they are unsure of the purpose of their analysis
- they are unsure of the level of discourse expected from them

Cottrell argues that critical thinking makes sense to the student if it is contextualised. Lecturers can encourage critical thought through the careful structuring of information and set exercises.

In 2005, Critical Thinking Skills: Developing Effective Analysis and Argument was published. The book aimed to help readers "develop an understanding of what is meant by critical thinking, and to develop their own reasoning skills". Cottrell grounds critical thinking as an everyday activity, such as deciding whether we believe something that we're told. Within an academic context, she presents the challenge of thinking critically as rigorous verification and, if justified by the evidence, having the confidence to argue for an alternative view. In 2011, Victor Glynn reviewed it as "one of the best texts for general critical thinking around at the moment" in Education Bookseller. The current, fourth edition of Critical Thinking Skills, was published in 2023.

=== Personalised learning ===
Cottrell encourages students to personalise their learning by reflecting on the way they learn and under what circumstances this is most effective. "If you are open, flexible and creative in trying new approaches, you will develop into a more rounded personality and a more effective learner".

Her books take the position that each student is unique in the particular details of:

- how we learn
- how we respond to new tasks, circumstances, people and challenges
- what we need in order to perform at our best.

=== Reflection ===
Stella sees reflection as a central component of study skills. Since Higher Education involves more autonomous learning than students may have experienced previously, they need to become responsible for reflecting on their own progress, strengths and areas in need of development. Examples of reflective questions include:

- Are you sufficiently motivated to achieve your goals?
- How will your course of study affect your longer-term ambitions?
- What are the most stimulating aspects of your current learning?
- What is blocking your progress?

Cottrell believes that accurate self-reflection is difficult and so includes brief structured reflective models throughout her books to help students. One such example is the Core Model for reflection, that appears in Skills for Success.

=== Personal development planning ===
Cottrell sees personal development planning (PDP) as a confluence of personal improvement, greater academic performance, and planning to achieve goals, "whether academic, personal or professional". For Cottrell, it is important that all students regularly reflect on how their course and extracurricular activities relate to their future ambitions: "Linking PDP, the programme of study and the student's future is especially important for younger students, who are less likely to have thought about careers."

In 2003, Cottrell published Skills for Success: The Personal Development Planning Handbook. The book was structured to represent a journey from defining a personal vision of success, to developing the academic and personal skills needed, and finally bringing all this together in an effective job application. The textbook design featured reflective exercises and self-evaluations, as well as cartoons similar to those seen in The Study Skills Handbook. The third edition was published in 2015.

=== Inclusion ===
The benefits and importance of social inclusion within the higher education system is a common theme in Stella Cottrell's writing. In an article written for Times Higher Education, she argued that "A variety of needs has been made manifest by larger class sizes, working students, broader social and international participation, the requirements of students with disabilities and better understanding of individual learning preferences."

Cottrell's writing assumes that students are different in how they learn and what they need to learn. The aim is to encourage students to take charge of their learning and find strategies that suit them best.

== Skills for Study ==
In 2010, Palgrave Macmillan launched skills4studycampus, an online e-learning resource based on the third edition of Stella Cottrell's The Study Skills Handbook. Stella was involved in the planning of skills4studycampus and the process of adapting The Study Skills Handbook to an interactive environment. skills4studycampus was updated in 2020 and relaunched as Skills for Study with additional features including articles and blogs.

Skills for Study is divided into twelve areas:

- Getting ready for academic study
- Reading and note-making
- Critical thinking skills
- Writing skills
- Referencing and plagiarism
- Groupwork and presentations
- Exam skills
- Research principles
- Projects, dissertations and reports
- Confidence with numbers
- Time management
- Employability and personal development

== Honorary doctorate ==
In 2011, the University of Bedfordshire announced that an honorary doctorate was to be awarded to Stella Cottrell "in recognition of her 'outstanding contribution to lifelong learning and widening participation'". On the announcement of this award, Stella summarised her work with the Lifelong Learning Centre: "I have always worked to create good educational opportunities for those who, for whatever reason, either underachieved in the past or didn't get a chance to study in higher education."

== Education ==
Dr. Cottrell completed her BA and D Phil in History at the University of Oxford, a PGCE in English also at Oxford and a BSc in Psychology at the Open University.
