= George Langford =

American biologist

George M. Langford
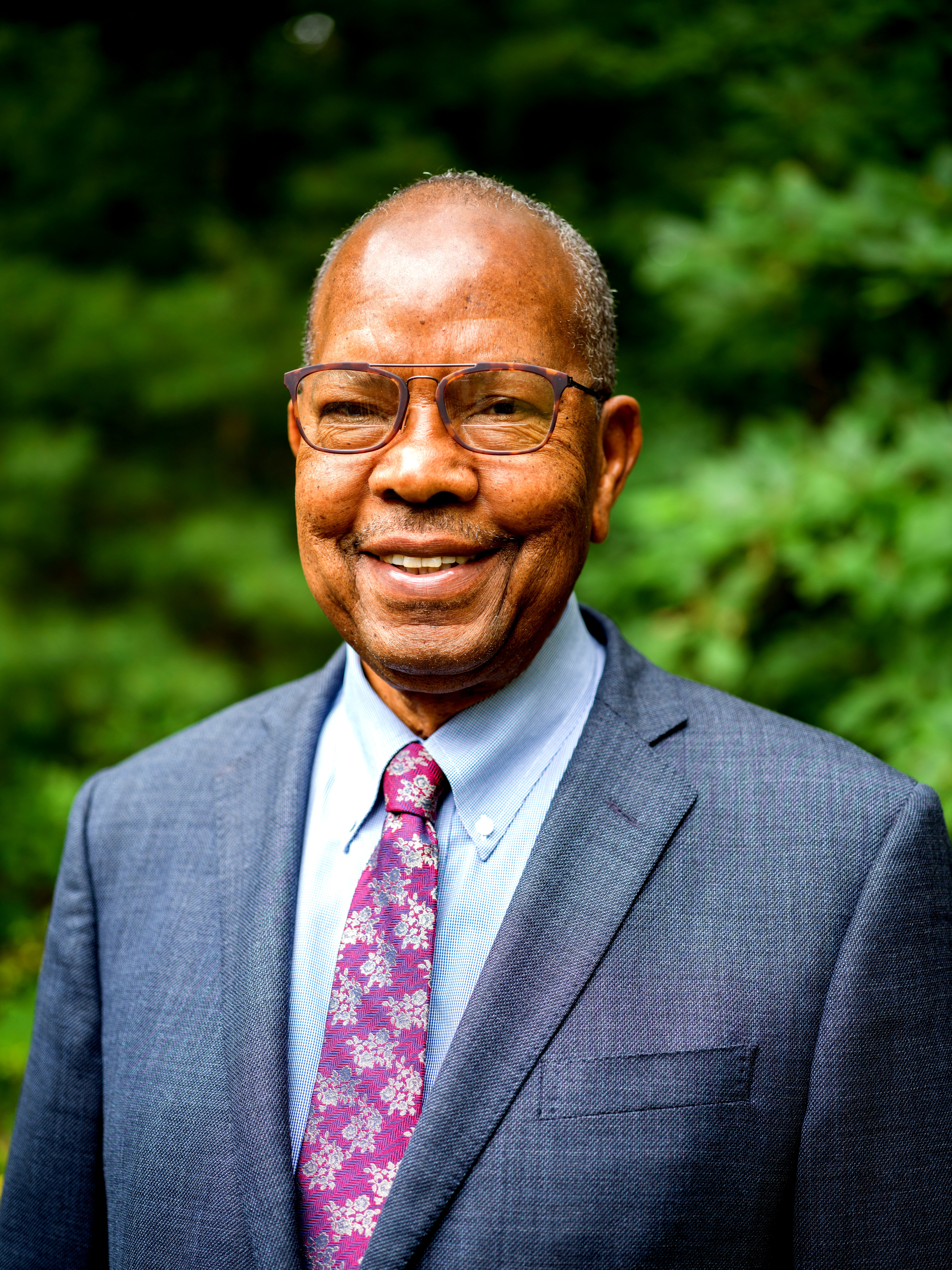
- Born: George Malcolm Langford; August 26, 1944; Roanoke Rapids, North Carolina
- Education: Fayetteville State University; Illinois Institute of Technology
- Spouse: Sylvia Langford
- Children: 3
- Awards: American Association for the Advancement of Science Fellow (2013); American Academy of Arts and Sciences Member (2021)
- Scientific career
- Fields: Cell Biology
- Workplaces: University of Pennsylvania; UMass Boston; Howard University; UNC Chapel Hill; Dartmouth College; UMass Amherst; Syracuse University
- Thesis: Anaerobic growth and metabolism of Euglena (1971)
- Doctoral advisor: William Danforth
- Other academic advisors: Shinya Inoué
- Website: langfordlab.syr.edu

George Malcolm Langford (born August 26, 1944) is a Professor of Biology, Dean Emeritus of the College of Arts and Sciences, and a distinguished Professor of Neuroscience at Syracuse University College of Arts and Sciences in Syracuse, New York. He is known for his work on the cell and molecular biology of the actin cytoskeleton in health and disease.

== Early life and education ==
Langford was born August 26, 1944, in Roanoke Rapids, North Carolina. He earned his Bachelors in Biology from the Fayetteville State University in Fayetteville, North Carolina in 1966. He earned his PhD in 1971 in Cell Biology at Illinois Institute of Technology in Chicago under William Danforth. During graduate school, he also worked at the Argonne National Laboratory with Robert Webb.

Langford trained as a National Institutes of Health (NIH) post-doctoral fellow at the University of Pennsylvania with Shinya Inoué between 1971-1973.

== Career ==
Langford began his career as an assistant professor in 1973 at University of Massachusetts Boston and moved to Howard University in 1977. He worked as an associate professor, and later as a full professor at UNC Chapel Hill. From 1991 to 2005, he was the Ernest Everett Just Professor of Natural Sciences and Professor of Biological Sciences at Dartmouth College. He served as the Dean at UMass Amherst from 2005 until 2008.

Langford became the Dean of the College of Arts and Sciences at Syracuse University in August 2008. He was succeeded by Karin Ruhlandt in 2015.

=== Service ===
In 1985, Langford was named the first chairman of the Minorities Affairs Committee of the American Society for Cell Biology. Langford was nominated by President Bill Clinton to the National Science Board where he served a six-year term on the 24-member panel from 1998-2004. He has served on the boards of the National Nanotechnology Infrastructure Network, the Burroughs Wellcome Fund Career Awards in the Biomedical Sciences Advisory Committee, the NIH SYN Study Section, the National Research Council Associateships Program Committee, the Sherman Fairchild Foundation Scientific Advisory Board, and the Massachusetts Life Science Collaborative Leadership Council.

== Awards ==
Langford became a fellow of the American Association for the Advancement of Science (AAAS) in 2013.

He was elected member of the American Academy of Arts and Sciences in April 2021.

Langford received an Honorary Doctorate of Humane Letters from the Beloit College in 2001.

He was awarded the 2022 Public Service Award by the American Society for Cell Biology (ASCB).

== Personal life ==
Langford is married to Sylvia Langford and they have three children.
