= Charlotte E. Maguire =

American physician

- Born: Charlotte C. Edwards; September 1, 1918; Indiana, U.S.
- Died: December 6, 2014 (aged 96); Tallahassee, Florida, U.S.
- Other name: Charlotte Edwards Maguire
- Occupation: Physician
- Years active: 1944 to 1988
- Known for: First female physician in Florida
- Spouse: Raymer Francis Maguire Sr. (m. 1948)

Charlotte E. Maguire (September 1, 1918 – December 6, 2014) was the first woman medical doctor in Orlando, Florida, and opened the first pediatric practice run by a woman in Orlando in 1946. She was one of the founders of the University of Florida College of Medicine and the Florida State University College of Medicine. Maguire was denoted as a “Great Floridian” in a 2013 ceremony and was inducted into the Florida Women's Hall of Fame posthumously in 2015.

== Early life and education ==
Charlotte C. Edwards was born on September 1, 1918 in Indiana. Her family had relocated from Illinois because of her mother's illness and she grew up in Orlando, Florida. When her mother died, Edwards was seven years old and her grandparents helped her father raise her.

Edwards wanted to become a physicist and when she won a scholarship to study chemistry and physics at the University of Heidelberg, she left for Germany. In 1938, at her father's insistence, she was evacuated due to World War II and after returning to the United States attended Memphis State Teacher's College, graduating in 1940. During her education, she worked as a switchboard operator for long-distance calls to pay her way through school.

When she completed her teaching degree, she applied to enter medical school in Memphis, Tennessee. She was initially accepted, but three days later was dismissed and told that another student needed the place. Unable to enter medical school due to the bias against admitting women, her grandfather intervened and gained her admittance to the University of Arkansas in Little Rock, Arkansas. Edwards completed her Doctor of Medicine degree in 1944 and returned to Orlando, Florida.

== Career ==
Edwards was hired as the first woman doctor in Orlando at the Orange General Hospital. Two years later, in 1946, she opened the first private practice in pediatrics run by a woman, providing medical care for children with disabilities and free service for those unable to afford care. She was appointed, because she was a recent graduate, by President John J. Tigert, as the only woman to serve on the Founders Committee to develop a college of medicine at the University of Florida. Then in 1947, she was appointed to serve as the chief of staff for the Children's Home Society in the Central Florida Division. In 1948, Edwards married a local lawyer and citrus grower, Raymer Francis Maguire Sr., who was a single father and 28 years older than she.

The following year, Maguire was appointed as the director of the Children's Health Clinic of Orlando and in 1952, she was named president of the Florida Pediatric Society, as the first woman to achieve the distinction. Throughout the 1950s, Maguire continued in these varying enterprises, leaving the Children's Home Society in 1956 and serving as a delegate to the World Health Conference held in London in 1957.

In 1960, her husband died and Maguire was left with his citrus business. She returned to school to learn how to cultivate, manage and market the five citrus groves and earned her certification from Florida Southern College. In 1965, she joined Mercy Hospital in Orlando as the chief of the pediatrics department, a post which she served until 1968. At that time, she closed her private practice and discontinued actively managing the citrus farm, moving to Tallahassee to take over the directorship of the Florida Crippled Children's Commission.

For a time in the 1970s, she served as the assistant secretary of health and scientific affairs in the Nixon administration for the Department of Health, Education and Welfare in Atlanta, but returned to Florida in 1975, taking over as medical services coordinator of the Health and Rehabilitative Services Department in Tallahassee.

Maguire worked on the clinical staff of the pediatrics department of the University of Florida in Gainesville, Florida, from 1980 to 1987, and then retired in 1988.

=== Philanthropy ===
In 1999, Maguire donated $1 million to Florida State University (FSU) to create the Charlotte Edwards Maguire Eminent Scholar Chair for the Program in Medical Sciences and the following year became an advocate, lobbying for the creation of a medical school at FSU. FSU opened their medical school in 2000 and she was awarded an honorary Doctor of Humane Letters degree on February 14, 2002, at the College of Medicine Administration Building.

In 2004, she provided 2 students with full-tuition scholarships to FSU and the following year, donated another $1 million to create a geriatrics program at the 2005 ceremony naming “The Charlotte Edwards Maguire Medical Library” in her honor. In 2010, she donated $1 million to the retirement home where she had lived since 1991 to create the Maguire Center for Lifelong Learning which houses an auditorium, computer lab, virtual library, and a bistro. She also established a scholarship fund for the home's employees to further their nursing education.

In a 2012 ceremony, then Florida governor Rick Scott bestowed the title “Great Floridian” on Maguire at Florida State University College of Medicine.

Maguire died on December 6, 2014, at Westminster Oaks Community in Tallahassee, Florida. She was posthumously elected to the Florida Women's Hall of Fame in 2015.
