= Tom Petway =

- Born: December 15, 1940 (age 85); Jacksonville, Florida
- Education: Florida State University
- Occupations: Business and Civic leader
- Political party: Republican
- Spouse: Elizabeth Piersol

Thomas Franklin Petway, III is a lifelong resident of Jacksonville, Florida and one of the most successful business and civic leaders in Jacksonville and the state of Florida.

== Personal ==
Petway was born in Jacksonville, Florida in 1940 and graduated from Terry Parker High School in 1958. He graduated from the Florida State University School of Business in 1962 with a Bachelor of Science Degree. Petway and his wife, the former Elizabeth "Betty" Piersol were high school sweethearts and married in 1963. The couple had four children, but their daughter Mandi passed in 1992 from Hodgkin's disease. His wife Betty died in 2025 from cancer. They were married for 62 years and enjoyed eight grandchildren.

== Business ==
Tom Petway was co-founder and Chairman of the Board of US Assure, Inc., a national insurance marketing and administrative services company. Petway's son Ty now leads the company.

In 1988, while acquiring the franchise for Prudential Network Realty in Duval, Clay and St. Johns counties, Linda Sherrer approached Petway for financial backing and business advice, which he provided. That business became very successful over the past twenty years, and Petway currently serves as a silent partner.

Petway was a co-founder of and a minority partner in the NFL's 30th franchise, the Jacksonville Jaguars. In January, 1995 he was invited by Paul W. Kahn to become a director of Safecard (renamed Ideon)).

He was also chairman of Citizens Property Insurance Corp., Casualty Joint Underwriting Association and Florida Residential Property.

== Civic activities ==
Petway was Co-Chairman of the organizing group for Super Bowl XXXIX and Co-Chairman and CEO of the Jacksonville Super Bowl Host Committee, Inc.

From 1999 until its elimination in July, 2001, he served his second gubernatorial appointment to the Florida Board of Regents of the State University System of Florida, serving as Chairman for two years; he previously served on the board from 1989 until 1995.

He was Chairman of the Board of Directors for the Community Hospice Foundation, which supports Community Hospice of Northeast Florida. Petway's wife is now serving on the board.

Petway served two terms as Chairman of the Jacksonville Economic Development Commission (JEDC), which was formed in the summer of 1996 to attract new and expanded business on the first coast.

== Political ==
Tom Petway is a Republican and a prominent Bush family supporter. He has been involved in numerous campaign committees and fund raising efforts and contributed substantially in 1988, with his company, to the Florida Republican Party. After the election, Petway was appointed to head the State Board of Regents.

Petway donated more than $300,000 to Republican causes for the 2000 election and was a lunch guest at President George Bush's ranch in Crawford, Texas, where he was given the traditional "pickup truck tour".

== Honors ==
Tom Petway received Florida State University's prestigious Doctor of Humane Letters for his leadership and accomplishments while chairman of the FSU Foundation board of directors. Petway helped the university quintuple its endowment from $50 million to $250 million.

He was one of 30 alumni inducted into the Terry Parker High School Hall of Fame on the school's 50th anniversary in 2005.

Petway was one of the first four individuals inducted into the First Coast Business Hall of Fame on October 22, 1999.

The Coggin College of Business at the University of North Florida honored Tom Petway with the Prime F. Osborn III Distinguished Business Leader Award on May 21, 2008, an award bestowed on prominent local business leaders.
