= List of University of Florida honorary degree recipients =

This list of University of Florida honorary degree recipients includes notable persons who have been recognized by the University of Florida for outstanding achievements in their fields that reflect the ideals and uphold the purposes of the university, and to whom the university faculty has voted to award honorary degrees in recognition of such attainments. Often, but not always, the honorary degree recipients have been alumni of the university, or have had ties to either the university or the state of Florida.

The University of Florida awarded its first honorary degree in 1909 to Andrew Sledd, in recognition of his four years of service as the founding president of the modern University of Florida. The first woman to whom the university awarded an honorary degree was Florida author and novelist Marjorie Kinnan Rawlings in 1941.

== Honorary degree recipients, 1909–25 ==
Recipient	Year/degree	Notability
Andrew Sledd	1909 D.D.	Andrew W. Sledd became the first president of the modern University of Florida following the consolidation of Florida's state institutions of higher education by the Buckman Act in 1905, and served from 1905 to 1909. He was an ordained Methodist minister and a noted Greek, Latin and biblical scholar. Sledd subsequently served as the president of Southern University (1910–14), and the first Professor of New Testament Literature at Emory University's Candler School of Theology (1914–39).
Thomas M. Shackleford	1910 LL.D.	Thomas M. Shackleford was an associate justice of the Florida Supreme Court for fifteen years from 1902 to 1917.
George M. Ward	1919 LL.D.	George Morgan Ward was the acting president of Rollins College, and a member of its board of trustees.
Peter H. Rolfs	1920 D.Sc.	Peter Henry Rolfs was the dean of the University of Florida College of Agriculture and the director of its Experiment Station. Rolfs later served as the director of a state college in Brazil.
P.K. Yonge	1921 LL.D.	P.K. Yonge was the president of Southern States Lumber Company of Pensacola. In his role as a long-time member and chairman of the Florida Board of Control (1910–17 and 1922–32), Yonge was responsible for guiding the consolidation, early growth and evolution of the University of Florida.
Nathan Bryan	1923 LL.D.	Nathan P. Bryan was the chairman of the Florida Board of Control, a U.S. Senator from Florida from 1911 to 1917, and a U.S. District Court judge in New Orleans. As chairman of the Board of Control, Bryan helped guide the consolidation and early growth of the University of the State of Florida.
William Jennings Bryan	1923 LL.D.	William Jennings Bryan was a prominent statesman, lawyer, Presbyterian churchman and lecturer. Bryan was a two-term U.S. Representative from Nebraska, the Democratic Party nominee for U.S. President in 1896, 1900 and 1908, and the first U.S. Secretary of State in Woodrow Wilson's administration from 1913 to 1915. As a lawyer and special prosecutor, he also represented the State of Tennessee in the Scopes Trial in 1925. Bryan was a personal friend of university president Albert A. Murphree, and as a supporter of the university, he chaired the campaign to raise funds for the construction of the Florida Union.

== Honorary degree recipients, 1926–50 ==
Recipient	Year/degree	Notability
Roger W. Babson	1927 LL.D.	Roger W. Babson was a prominent statistician and economist. Helped further interests of the state.
Orestes Ferrara	1930 LL.D.	Orestes Ferrara was Cuba's ambassador extraordinary and plenipotentiary to the United States from 1926 to 1930.
Doyle E. Carlton	1933 D.C.L.	Doyle E. Carlton was the Governor of Florida from 1929 to 1930, and a prominent attorney in Tampa.
Duncan U. Fletcher	1933 LL.D.	Duncan U. Fletcher was a U.S. Senator from Florida from 1908 to 1936.
Scott Loftin	1935 D.C.L.	Scott Loftin was a prominent Florida attorney who was the fifty-eighth president of the American Bar Association, and served as the chairman of the University Endowment Corporation of the University of Florida.
Charles Herty	1937 D.Sc.	Charles Herty was a noted chemist who developed processes for using pine pulp in paper manufacture.
Edward Conradi	1939 LL.D.	Edward Conradi was the principal of the Normal and Industrial School of St. Petersburg (1905–09), dean of the Florida State College for Women (1909), and then its president for thirty-two years (1909–41).
David Fairchild	1939 LL.D.	David Fairchild was an eminent botanist, lecturer and author.
Marjorie Kinnan Rawlings	1941 L.H.D.	Marjorie Kinnan Rawlings was a well-known novelist, author of The Yearling, and winner of the O. Henry Memorial Prize and the Pulitzer Prize. She often wrote on Florida-related topics. Rawlings was the first woman to receive an honorary degree from the University of Florida.
Raymond Robins	1941 LL.D.	Raymond Robins was a social and civic leader, World War I U.S. Army officer, lecturer and world traveler. Degree conferred at his home in sanctuary at Chinsegut Hill, Florida, which he gave to the U.S. government in June 1941. His was the first University of Florida honorary degree conferred off campus.
Albert H. Blanding	1942 LL.D.	Albert H. Blanding was a U.S. Army brigadier general in France from 1918 to 1919, and was later the chief of the U.S. National Guard Bureau from 1936 to 1940. He was also a member of the Florida Board of Control 1922 to 1936. Blanding graduated from Florida Agricultural College with a Bachelor of Science degree (B.S.) in 1894.
Thomas Barbour	1944 D.Sc.	Thomas Barbour was a naturalist, teacher, author, world traveler, and director of the Harvard Museum of Comparative Zoology. He had an interest in Florida's wildlife and natural history, and presented the University of Florida with the famous terrestrial Miocene vertebrate locality in Gilchrist County, Florida.
James Melton	1945 Mus.D.	James Melton was a prominent actor, artist and singer, and frequently appeared with the Metropolitan Opera Association. Melton attended the University of Florida from 1921 to 1923.
James B. Whitfield	1945 LL.D.	James Bryan Whitfield was the chief justice of the Florida Supreme Court, serving on the court for thirty-nine years—the longest tenure in the history of the court. The honorary degree was conferred in Tallahassee.
James Van Fleet	1946 LL.D.	James Van Fleet was a 1915 West Point graduate, a University of Florida professor of military science, and the head coach of the Florida Gators football team from 1923 to 1924. He served as a commissioned officer in World War I, World War II and the Korean War. During World War II, Van Fleet attained the rank of major general, and commanded a corps of the U.S. Third Army under General George S. Patton. In the Korean War, he replaced General Matthew Ridgway as the commander of all United States and United Nations forces.
William K. Jackson	1946 LL.D.	William K. Jackson was the prosecuting attorney and U.S. Attorney for the Panama Canal Zone, and later served as the president of U.S. Chamber of Commerce. Jackson graduated from the University of Florida at Lake City with a bachelor of science degree (B.S.) in 1904.
Colgate W. Darden Jr.	1948 LL.D.	Colgate W. Darden Jr. was the governor of Virginia, the chancellor of the College of William and Mary in Williamsburg, Virginia, and the president of the University of Virginia in Charlottesville, Virginia.
George D. Stoddard	1948 LL.D.	George D. Stoddard was an author, educator, administrator, a former president of the State University of New York, the then-current president of the University of Illinois, and a member of U.S. President Harry S. Truman's Commission on Higher Education.
Owen D. Young	1948 LL.D.	Owen D. Young was a lawyer, banker, corporate director, economist and humanitarian. Young was the recipient of honorary degrees from twenty-four different colleges and universities.
Alben Barkley	1949 L.H.D.	Alben Barkley represented Kentucky in the House of Representatives (1927–33) and the U.S. Senate (1933–49, 1955–56), and served as the U.S. Vice President under U.S. President Harry S. Truman (1949–53).
Wilson Popenoe	1950 D.Sc.	Wilson Popenoe was a scholar, horticulturist, and ambassador of good will from the United States to Latin America for nearly forty years. Popenoe served as the director of Escuela Agricola Panamericana at Tegucigalpa, Honduras.
Emsterio Santiago Santovenia	1950 LL.D.	Emsterio Santiago Santovenia was a Cuban lawyer, writer, historian and statesman. Santovenia served as the foreign minister of Cuba.

== Honorary degree recipients, 1951–75 ==
Recipient	Year/degree	Notability
Thomas J. Watson	1952 LL.D.	Thomas J. Watson was a business executive and industrial leader who served as the president of International Business Machines Corp. (IBM) from 1919 to 1951, building IBM into one of the major American corporate manufacturers.
Boyd Henry Bode	1953 LL.D.	Boyd Henry Bode was an internationally renowned philosopher, educator, constructive critic and author who was a professor of philosophy at the University of Wisconsin and the University of Illinois, and a professor of education at Ohio State University. Bode emphasized the vital contribution of public education and publicly supported schools should to the success of democratic government.
Alvin C. Eurich	1953 L.H.D.	Alvin C. Eurich was a former president of Northwestern University and State University of New York. Exponent of general education for maintenance of a free society. Vice president, Fund for Advancement of Education, Ford Foundation.
John A. Hannah	1953 L.H.D.	Hannah was the former president of Michigan State College (now Michigan State University), and an internationally known agricultural specialist, distinguished educator, and statesman. He was formerly the Assistant Secretary of Defense for Manpower and Personnel.
Virgil Melvin Hancher	1953 D.C.L.	Professor of law and president of State University of Iowa (now known as the University of Iowa). Attorney, educator, administrator, humanitarian. Member of many learned societies.
Millard Fillmore Caldwell	1953 LL.D.	Florida's twenty-eighth governor. Legislator, statesman, student of international affairs, tireless worker for higher educational standards in the South. Contributor to civic betterment, national safety.
Spessard Holland	1953 D.C.L.	LL.B., University of Florida, 1916. First president of combined university student body. First native son to serve as Governor and U.S. Senator. Well known for contributions to law, education, finance and public works.
Charles Kettering	1953 D.Sc.	Vice president and director, General Motors Outstanding inventor, engineer, theoretical scientist, industrialist, philanthropist and humanitarian.
John J. Tigert	1953 Litt.D.	John J. Tigert was the third president of the University of Florida (1928–47). He was previously president of Kentucky Wesleyan College, a professor of philosophy and psychology, athletic director, and head basketball and football coach at the University of Kentucky, and U.S. Commissioner of Education (1921–28). Tigert served longer than any other University of Florida president, and in his nineteen years as president, "Big John" was responsible for numerous academic, athletic and administrative reforms. Tigert was also a member of the College Football Hall of Fame.
Mark D. Hollis	1956 D.Sc.	Chief engineer, U.S. Public Health Service, Assistant U.S. Surgeon General. Outstanding engineer and administrator in field of environmental health.
Arthur S. Adams	1956 LL.D.	President, American Council on Education. Prominent in fields of science and education and in military service as a U.S. Navy officer.
Harold Raymond Medina	1956 D.C.L.	Federal judge for the U.S. District Court, Southern District of New York; later, appellate judge of the United States Court of Appeals, Second Circuit. Well-known educator and jurist
Robert Frost	1960 Litt.D.	Robert Frost was a well-known and respected American poet, and a long-time friend and patron of the University of Florida.
William A. Shands	1960 LL.D.	William A. Shands was a native son of Florida, legislative leader, statesman, churchman, and farmer. Shands was an eighteen-year member of the Florida Senate, and served as the senate president in 1949. He was a forceful advocate for the state's creation of the University of Florida Health Science Center.
George Smathers	1961 LL.D.	LL.B., University of Florida, 1938. George Smathers was a U.S. Representative from 1947 to 1951, and a U.S. Senator from Florida from 1951 to 1969. Smathers was recognized as one of the U.S. Congress' experts on Latin American affairs. Later, Smathers made a $20 million contribution to the endowment of the university's libraries.
James Webb	1963 LL.D.	James E. Webb served as the second Administrator of the National Aeronautics and Space Administration (NASA), from 1961 to 1968, during the critical years of the U.S. manned spaceflight program . Webb was a lawyer, industrialist, educator, administrator, and leader in space sciences.
Robert A. Gray	1964 LL.D.	Author, educator, civic leader and statesman. Florida's Secretary of State, 1930–1961.
J. George Harrar	1964 D.Sc.	President, Rockefeller Foundation. Taught at University of Puerto Rico, Virginia Polytechnic Institute, and Washington State College. Received Certificate for Meritorious Leadership in Agriculture from UF, 1950.
Lewis Powell	1965 LL.D.	Lewis F. Powell, Jr. was an associate justice of the Supreme Court of the United States, and the president of the American Bar Association.
William Shepherd Dix	1967 LL.D.	Librarian, national leader in information retrieval.
J. Wayne Reitz	1967 L.H.D.	J. Wayne Reitz was the fifth president of the University of Florida, serving for twelve years from 1955 to 1967. Reitz oversaw the peaceful integration of the university, and the expansion of its student body and physical plant during a period of rapid growth.
Robert B. Mautz	1968 L.H.D.	Robert B. Mautz was the Vice President of Academic Affairs at the University of Florida, before being appointed the Chancellor of the Board of Regents of State University System of Florida
Harold Sebring	1968 LL.D.	Harold Sebring was the head coach of the Florida Gators football team from 1925 to 1927, while attending the university's College of Law. Sebring served as a justice of the Florida Supreme Court, an American judge at the Nuremberg Trials, and dean of the Stetson University College of Law. Sebring graduated from the University of Florida with a Bachelor of Laws degree (LL.B.) in 1928.
Edith B. Tigert	1968 D.H.L.	Edith Bristol Tigert was the wife of former University of Florida President John J. Tigert, and served as first lady of the University of Florida for nineteen years from 1928 to 1947.
Elvis Stahr, Jr.	1968 LL.D.	President of Indiana University; educator; lawyer and public administrator.
Lester R. Dragstedt	1969 D.Sc.	Research Professor of Surgery, UF.
George Low	1969 D.Sc.	National Aeronautics and Space Administration (NASA) senior manager, held such positions as the Director of Spacecraft and Flight Missions, NASA Deputy Director in Houston, Texas, and Manager of the Apollo Spacecraft Program Office.
Marshall Nirenberg	1969 D.Sc.	Shared the 1968 Nobel Prize in medicine and physiology with two other U.S. scientists.
Harry Melvin Philpott	1969 LL.D.	University of Florida professor of religion, and president of Auburn University.
Lucius D. Battle	1970 LL.D.	Skillful diplomat and an effective administrator.
Andrew Nelson Lytle	1970 Litt.D.	Writer, teacher and editor of the Sewannee Review.
Nell C. Miller	1970 L.H.D.	Nell Critzer Miller was the wife of J. Hillis Miller, Sr., the fourth president of the University of Florida, and served as the university's first lady for six years from 1947 to 1953. She was also an English teacher, the assistant director for the Wesley Foundation, and the head of the Office of Patient Services at the J. Hillis Miller Health Science Center.
John Barkley Rosser	1970 D.Sc.	Contributor to the field of mathematics and has served as a consultant and panel member for the U.S. Government. Director of the Mathematics Research Center of the U.S. Army at Madison.
Mason W. Gross	1970 LL.D.	President of Rutgers, the State University; Chairman of the National Book Committee, philosopher and writer.
Red Barber	1970 Litt.D.	Red Barber was a noted author, lecturer and radio sports broadcaster. Barber attended the University of Florida from 1929 1931, and worked as announcer for Florida Gators football games while he was an undergraduate.
C. Vann Woodward	1970 Litt.D.	Sterling Professor of History, Yale University. Author and lecturer.
John C. Slater	1971 D.Sc.	Author of numerous articles on fundamental nature of atoms, molecules and solids.
Thomas C. Clark	1971 LL.D.	Thomas C. Clark was an associate justice of the United States Supreme Court from 1949 to 1967.
Sidney Hook	1971 L.H.D.	Leading philosopher and educator.
	1972 Mus.D.	Outstanding musician and composer.
Nathaniel P. Reed	1972 D.P.S.	Assistant Secretary of the Department of the Interior for Fish, Wildlife and Parks.
Chesterfield Smith	1972 LL.D.	Lawyer, civic leader, statesman, public servant.
Max Lerner	1972 Litt.D.	Distinguished author, teacher, lecturer.
LeRoy Collins	1973 LL.D.	LeRoy Collins was the thirty-third governor of Florida, serving from 1955 to 1961, and was later appointed as U.S. Under-Secretary of Commerce by U.S. President Lyndon B. Johnson.
Norman Borlaug	1973 D.Sc.	Norman Borlaug won the Nobel Peace Prize for his work as an agricultural scientist, known as "The Apostle of Wheat", with the Rockefeller Foundation.
Julian Goodman	1973 D.H.L.	Outstanding leadership in communication.
John Tracy Ellis	1973 Litt.D.	Eminent historian and lecturer.
J. Broward Culpepper	1973 Litt.D.	Distinguished educator.
James Alfred Perkins	1974 Litt.D.	Outstanding scholar and international educator.
William H. Parham	1974 D.Hlth.	Outstanding health administrator, Executive Vice President, Florida Medical Assn. Adm.
John Atanasoff	1974 D.Sc.	Distinguished engineer and inventor, invented first electronic digital computer.
Robben W. Fleming	1974 D.H.L.	Distinguished educator; President of the University of Michigan; well-known labor arbitrator and attorney.
Rae O. Weimer	1974 LL.D.	Founder and first Dean of the College of Journalism and Communications of the University of Florida.
Donald T. Campbell	1975 D.Sc.	Distinguished psychologist and scientist; President of the National Academy of Sciences.
Ants Oras	1975 Litt.D.	Eminent scholar and internationally recognized man of letters; University of Florida Professor Emeritus of English.
Paul G. Rogers	1975 LL.D.	Prominent U.S. Representative from Florida, U.S. Congressional leader on public health matters.
Edward Knipling	1975 D.Sc.	Scholar, author, researcher and science advisor; developed DDT and eradicated screwworm fly.
Johanna Döbereiner	1975 D.Sc.	Prominent scientist and researcher, working mainly with nitrogen fixing capability of grasses.

== Honorary degree recipients, 1976–2000 ==
Recipient	Year/degree	Notability
Ripley P. Bullen	1976 D.Sc.	Noted archaeologist and anthropologist. Became curator of Florida State Museum in 1952; Curator Emeritus at time of award.
Torgny Segerstedt	1976 D.H.L.	Rector Magnificus, Uppsala University; internationally known educator, philosopher, lecturer; author.
Willard L. Boyd	1976 LL.D.	Distinguished educator, author and law expertise; President of University of Iowa.
Joseph Weil	1976 D.E.	Dean Emeritus of University of Florida College of Engineering; established EIES, a visionary in programs as beach erosion, materials sciences, sewage and water, sanitary engineering and nuclear energy.
George S. Wise	1977 D.H.L.	Lifetime Chancellor of Tel Aviv University. Outstanding educator, businessman and humanitarian. President, George S. Wise and Co., newsprint manufacturing of Miami.
Maclyn McCarty	1977 D.Sc.	Vice President of Rockefeller University. Conducted research on DNA and in the fields of microbiology and immunology.
Elliot Richardson	1978 LL.D.	Ambassador-at-Large and Special Representative of the U.S. President to the Law of the Sea Conference. Former U.S. Ambassador to the Court of St. James and served in four cabinet posts—Secretary of Commerce; U.S. Attorney General; Secretary of Defense; Secretary of Health, Education and Welfare.
Pauli Murray	1978 D.H.	Jurist, educator, poet and theologian. First black woman priest ordained by Episcopal Church. Granddaughter of a slave.
James R. Shepley	1978 D.H.L.	Commencement speaker. President, Time Inc.; distinguished journalist, writer and businessman.
Nancy Hanks	1979 D.F.A.	Chairman of the National Endowment for the Arts (1969–77). Vice chairman and trustee of the Rockefeller Brothers Fund.
Philip S. Handler	1979 D.Sc.	President of the National Academy of Sciences.
Allen H. Neuharth	1980 Litt.D.	Commencement speaker. President of Gannett and Company. Chairman and president of the American Newspaper Publishers Association.
James Willard Hurst	1980 LL.D.	Commencement speaker. Distinguished legal historian, author and educator. Professor of Law, University of Wisconsin.
J. Hillis Miller, Jr.	1980 Litt.D.	J. Hillis Miller, Jr. is an internationally known English literature scholar, critic and professor, and the Frederick W. Hilles Professor of English at Yale University in New Haven, Connecticut. Miller is also the son of J. Hillis Miller, Sr., the fourth president of the University of Florida.
Molly Harrower	1981 D.H.L.	A psychologist, teacher, writer, researcher and poet, she is internationally recognized by psychologists and psychiatrists for her contributions to the understanding of personality.
Donald R. Matthews	1981 D.P.S.	1953 UF Distinguished Alumnus Award recipient; U.S. Representative from the 8th District of Florida from 1952 to 1967; Administrator of the Rural Community Development Service, U.S. Department of Agriculture.
Alfred A. McKethan	1981 DC	B.S.B.A., University of Florida, 1931. Banker, public servant, civic leader, patron of education.
Arthur C. Allyn, Jr.	1981 D.Sc.	Chairman of A.C. Allyn and Co. and Director Emeritus of the Allyn Museum of Entomology. in Sarasota, Florida. Former President of the Chicago White Sox. Former partner of Francis I. dePont and Co.
Edward E. David Jr.	1982 D.Sc.	Former science advisor to U.S. President, director of the U.S. Office of Science and Technology, president of Exxon Research and Engineering Co. One of the nation's strongest advocates for improving engineering and scientific education.
Nahum N. Glatzer	1982 D.H.L.	Internationally recognized Judaic scholar, historian, editor and teacher. Prominent faculty member at Brandeis University and Boston University.
David S. Saxon	1982 D.Sc.	President, University of California System. Internationally recognized physicist and leader in higher education administration.
Reubin O'Donovan Askew	1983 D.P.S.	J.D., University of Florida, 1956. Former governor of Florida. U.S. Served in Florida House of Representatives and Florida Senate. Appointed U.S. Trade Representative U.S. President Jimmy Carter.
Manning J. Dauer	1983 LL.D.	B.A. and M.A., University of Florida. Historian, political scientist, writer, consultant and University of Florida Distinguished Service Professor. Wrote a classic in early American history and political theory, established the guidelines for reapportionment in Florida and other states, and taught more than 15,000 students during his fifty-year teaching career.
Cornelius Vanderbilt Whitney	1983 D.H.L.	Leader in the arts, sciences, sports, industry and government. Co-producer of first color films, including such classics as A Star is Born and Gone With The Wind. Established the C.V. Whitney Laboratory for Experimental Marine Biology and Medicine at the University of Florida, located in St. Augustine, Florida. Founded Pan American Airways and the Hudson Bay Mining and Smelting Company.
James L. Knight	1984 D.H.L.	Built one of the best newspapers, The Miami Herald, and helped establish one of the largest newspaper groups in the nation, The Knight-Ridder Newspapers. He has served twice as President of the Southern Newspaper Publishers Association.
James Willis Walter	1984 LL.D.	Industrial leader, Innovator in home building industry; Chairman of Jim Walter Corp.
Lawrence Lewis Jr.	1986 D.H.L.	Businessman who was prime mover in historic preservation, restoration and reconstruction of St. Augustine. Since 1965, trustee of the Historic St. Augustine Preservation Board.
Archbishop Iakovos	1986 D.P.S.	World religious leader, civil rights activist, and a crusader in the modern ecumenical movement for Christian unity. Head of the Greek Orthodox Church of North and South America for twenty-seven years. Received Presidential Medal of Freedom from President Carter in 1980.
Anna Schwartz	1987 Litt.D.	A noted research economist for more than forty years. She has made major contributions to economics in monetary economics and economic history. She has co-authored several internationally prominent publications on monetary standards with Nobel Laureate Milton Friedman.
Lucille M. Mair	1988 D.H.L.	A pioneer in women's studies and former ambassador. She has held the highest position of any women ever in the United Nations. Research, writer, lecturer and advisor at the University of West Indies.
Marjory S. Douglas	1988 Litt.D.	Marjory Stoneman Douglas was a conservationist with a career spanning seventy years. She has given the State of Florida the groundwork for preserving, protecting, and recovering its natural resources. She received many honors and awards for her efforts in conservation.
C. Farris Bryant	1988 D.P.S.	Attorney, businessman, and 34th governor of Florida.
Howard Earle Skipper	1989 D.Sc.	President emeritus of the Southern Research Institute. His research has had a worldwide impact on the treatment of cancer. His research has resulted in approximately 200 publications.
Alan Stephenson Boyd	1991 LL.D.	First Secretary of Transportation under President Lyndon Johnson; first Floridian ever to serve as a full member of the President's Cabinet. President of Airbus Industries of North America.
Don Fuqua	1991 D.P.S.	Alumnus, House Representative for Florida and U.S. At 29, he was the youngest Democrat in Congress. National president of UF's Alumni Association and chair of UF's D.C. area Regional Capital Campaign.
Johnnetta B. Cole	1992 D.H.L.	President of Spelman College, anthropologist, educator and activist.
John W. Griffin	1992 D.H.L.	Florida archaeologist, UF alumnus, researcher, scholar, administrator, author.
Federico Zaragoza	1992 D.Sc.	Director-General of UNESCO, Spanish scientist, educator, administrator, philosopher and politician.
David Cofrin	1993 D.F.A.	Gainesville medical doctor and philanthropist, his many gifts included the basic funding for the Samuel P. Harn Museum of Art.
David Lawrence Jr.	1993 D.Jm.	Publisher of the Miami Herald and other major newspapers.
Murray Gell-Mann	1994 DNR	Winner of Nobel Prize for physics; discovered and named the quark. Leader in environmental conservation; served as director of MacArthur Foundation.
Charles Bennett	1994 LL.D.	Served in U.S. Congress for forty-four years; set an all-time record by not missing a single legislative vote for forty-one years. Author of seven books on Florida history. Decorated five times for combat service in World War II.
Jan G.F. Veldhuis	1995 D.P.S.	President of Utrecht University, leader in international education, former Fulbright Scholar who promoted that program and others.
Margaretta Styles	1997 D.Sc.	Ed.D., University of Florida. Nurse, educator, helped establish international standards for nursing. President of International Council of Nurses and American Nurses Credentialing Center.
Norman Schwarzkopf, Jr.	1998 D.P.S.	Military leader of U.S. and coalition forces in the Persian Gulf War, General Schwarzkopf was recognized for his environmental and humanitarian work, especially with seriously ill children.
David M. Lee	1998 D.Sc.	Nobel Prize winner in low temperature physics. Was visiting professor at UF and worked with UF faculty.
J. Stanley Marshall	1998 D.P.S.	Former president of Florida State University, founder and CEO of James Madison Institute, former president of NASULGC
William Terrell Hodges	1999 LL.D.	Federal judge and chairman of the executive committee of the U.S. Judicial Conference.

== Honorary degree recipients, 2001–present ==
Recipient	Year/degree	Notability
Virgil D. Hawkins	2001 LL.D.	Virgil D. Hawkins was a civil rights activist who sought to integrate the University of Florida by seeking admission to the College of Law in the 1950s. Hawkins was the recipient of the University of Florida's second posthumous honorary degree.
George Andrews	2002 D.Sc.	George Andrews is one of the most important and influential mathematicians of his generation. He is one of the world's leading authorities on the Theory of Partitions and the work of the Indian mathematical genius Srinivasa Ramanujan.
Jeffrey Spieler	2002 D.P.S.	Jeffrey Spieler is a recognized leader in the fight for improving the health and the quality of life of vulnerable populations throughout the world. He is known for his advocacy for reproductive health, family planning and the development of better contraceptive choices.
Howard T. Odum	2003 D.Sc.	Howard T. Odum was a University of Florida graduate research professor emeritus, and the founder of the university's Center for Environmental Policy. Odum was a pioneering authority in the field of ecosystem ecology.
Samuel Proctor	2004 D.P.S.	Samuel Proctor was a Distinguished Service Professor Emeritus at the University of Florida and director of the University of Florida Oral History Project. Proctor was recognized as one of the "50 Distinguished Floridians of the 20th Century" and a national pioneer in the field of oral history. He co-authored a history of the university entitled Gator History: A Pictorial History of the University of Florida (1987).
William Francis Whitman, Jr.	2004 D.P.S.	William Francis Whitman, Jr. was a horticulturist who prospected for unusual tropical fruits around the world, and popularized them in the United States. Whitman was an alumnus of the University of Florida.
Edward Villella	2005 D.F.A.	Edward Villella is an American ballet dancer and choreographer who is frequently cited as America's most celebrated male dancer.
Linda Aiken	2006 D.Sc.	Linda Aiken is an international authority known for advancing quality patient care through research and health policy work.
Bob Graham	2006 D.P.S.	Bob Graham is a former Florida governor and U.S. Senator (1986–2004). Graham helped to create the Bob Graham Centers at University of Florida and the University of Miami which focus on policy studies on public leadership, the Americas and homeland security.
Robert Grubbs	2006 D.Sc.	Robert Grubbs was the recipient of 2005 Nobel Prize in Chemistry along with two others who developed the metathesis method in organic synthesis.
Barry Barish	2007 D.Sc.	Barry Barish is the Linde Professor of Physics who conducted experiments that revealed the quark substructure of the nucleon.
Bo Diddley	2008	Bo Diddley was an original and influential American rock-and-roll singer, guitarist and songwriter. Although the honorary degree was confirmed by the university before his death on June 2, 2008, the degree was awarded posthumously. Diddley's is only the third posthumous honorary degree awarded by the University of Florida.

== Key to degree abbreviations ==
=== Honorary degrees ===
- D.C.L. – Doctor of Civil Law
- D.D. – Doctor of Divinity
- D.F.A. – Doctor of Fine Arts
- D.H.L. – Doctor of Humane Letters
- D.Litt. – Doctor of Letters
- D.P.A. – Doctor of Public Administration
- D.P.S. – Doctor of Public Service
- D.Sc. – Doctor of Science
- L.H.D. – Doctor of Humane Letters
- LL.D. – Doctor of Laws
- Mus.D. – Doctor of Music

=== Earned degrees ===
- B.A. – Bachelor of Arts
- B.S. – Bachelor of Science
- J.D. – Juris Doctor (professional law degree; replaced LL.B.)
- LL.B. – Bachelor of Laws (former law degree; superseded by J.D.)
- M.A. – Master of Arts
- M.S. – Master of Science
- Ph.D. – Doctor of Philosophy (terminal graduate research degree in most disciplines)

== See also ==
- Florida Gators
- History of Florida
- History of the University of Florida
- List of University of Florida alumni
- List of University of Florida faculty and administrators
- List of University of Florida presidents

== Bibliography ==
- Pleasants, Julian M., Gator Tales: An Oral History of the University of Florida, University of Florida, Gainesville, Florida (2006). ISBN 0-8130-3054-4
- Proctor, Samuel, & Wright Langley, Gator History: A Pictorial History of the University of Florida, South Star Publishing Company, Gainesville, Florida (1986). ISBN 0-938637-00-2.
- Van Ness, Carl, & Kevin McCarthy, Honoring the Past, Shaping the Future: The University of Florida, 1853–2003, University of Florida, Gainesville, Florida (2003).
