= Florida Board of Governors =

Governing board for public universities in Florida, US

- Type: Governing board
- Established: 2003
- Chancellor: Ray Rodrigues
- Students: 349,921 (2022)
- Location: Tallahassee, Florida, U.S.
- Website: flbog.edu

The Florida Board of Governors is a 17-member board serving as the constitutional governing body for the State University System of Florida, which includes all public universities of the state of Florida.

The Florida Legislature abolished the Florida Board of Regents, the predecessor of the Florida Board of Governors, in July 2001, with Governor Jeb Bush signing the act into law. Former governor of Florida and then United States senator Bob Graham (D-FL) opposed the decision and led a ballot initiative to restore the statewide higher education body. In 2002, voters approved a Florida constitutional amendment championed by Graham. The Board of Governors was established in 2003 as a result. The establishment of the Board of Governors is part of the Constitution of Florida and can only be abolished through another constitutional amendment.

The Florida Board of Education, also appointed by the governor, oversees K–20 education and community colleges.

During the 2022–2023 academic year, the State University System enrolled 349,921 total students, and it is the second largest state university system in the United States, after the California State University system.

== Universities under the board ==
Universities
University	Location	Established	Enrollment (Fall 2024)
Florida A&M University	Tallahassee, Florida	1887	8,972
Florida Atlantic University	Boca Raton, Florida	1961	30,246
Florida Gulf Coast University	Fort Myers, Florida	1991	15,962
Florida International University	Miami, Florida	1965	48,696
Florida Polytechnic University	Lakeland, Florida	2012	1,766
Florida State University	Tallahassee, Florida	1851	42,945
New College of Florida	Sarasota, Florida	1960	872
University of Central Florida	Orlando, Florida	1963	69,067
University of Florida	Gainesville, Florida	1853	58,933
University of North Florida	Jacksonville, Florida	1969	15,732
University of South Florida	Tampa, Florida	1956	47,906
University of West Florida	Pensacola, Florida	1963	13,851

== Current members of the board ==
The Florida Board of Governors has seventeen members, including fourteen voting members appointed by the governor, as well as the Florida commissioner of education, the chair of the Advisory Council of Faculty Senates, and the chair of the Florida Student Association. The board appoints a chancellor, who serves as the system's chief executive.

Governors
Name	Profession	Education	Term start	Term end
Appointed by Governor
Ashley Bell Barnett	former teacher, donor	BA (Florida Southern), MPA (USF)	November 27, 2023	January 6, 2026
Douglas Broxson	politician	BS (Evangel University)	October 27, 2025	January 6, 2031
Tim Cerio, Vice-Chair	attorney	BA, JD (UF)	October 27, 2017	January 6, 2031
Aubrey Edge	President & CEO, First Coast Energy		February 3, 2020	January 6, 2027
Carson Good	real estate	(FSU), MBA (Rollins College)	May 8, 2024	January 6, 2031
Edward Haddock	lawyer & businessman	BA (Ohio Wesleyan), JD (UVA)	November 20, 2020	January 6, 2027
Ken Jones	lawyer & businessman	BA (FSU), JD (UF)	November 20, 2020	January 6, 2027
Alan M. Levine, Chair	President & CEO, Mountain States Health Alliance	BSc, MBA, MSc (UF)	June 22, 2017	January 6, 2031
Ashley Lukis	Lawyer	BA, JD (FSU)	January 13, 2026	January 6, 2027
Charles H. Lydecker	insurance executive	BA (American)	June 14, 2019	January 6, 2027
Craig Mateer	businessman	BA (FSU)	March 11, 2022	January 6, 2027
Michael Okaty	lawyer	BA (UCF), JD, LLM (NYU)	January 13, 2026	January 6, 2033
Keith Perry	roofing contractor		January 13, 2026	January 6, 2031
Nick Sinatra	political advisor, real estate developer	BA (Yale), MBA (Wharton School)	January 13, 2026	January 6, 2033
Remaining Members
Anastasios Kamoutsas	Commissioner of Education	BA (FIU), JD (Regent University)	July 14, 2025	
Kimberly Dunn	Chair, Advisory Council of Faculty Senates	PhD	June 1, 2025	May 31, 2026
Carson Dale	Chair, Florida Student Association	BA (FSU, in progress)	June 1, 2025	May 31, 2026

== Initiatives ==
=== 2016 Think Florida ===
In January 2016, the State University System launched a statewide communications and marketing campaign to build and bolster the state's entrepreneurial climate - Think Florida: A Higher Degree for Business. The campaign's focus is a strong connection between the system's universities and Florida's businesses, with an emphasis on collaboration in the areas of talent, research and partnerships.

=== 2014 Performance-based funding ===
The Board of Governors unveiled a performance-based funding model in 2014 to incentivize universities to improve on key metrics, from graduation rates to post-graduation success.

The model has four guiding principles:

1. use metrics that align with SUS Strategic Plan goals,
2. reward excellence or improvement,
3. have a few clear, simple metrics, and
4. acknowledge the unique mission of the different institutions.

Key components of the model:

- Institutions will be evaluated on either excellence or Improvement for each metric.
- Data is based on one-year data.
- The benchmarks for excellence were based on the Board of Governors 2025 System Strategic Plan goals and analysis of relevant data trends, whereas the benchmarks for Improvement were determined after reviewing data trends for each metric.
- The Florida Legislature and governor determine the amount of new state funding and a proportional amount of institutional funding that would come from each university's recurring state base appropriation.

=== 2010 Preeminent State Research Universities ===
In 2010, the Florida Legislature created the Preeminent State Research University program and set 12 benchmarks to define these schools, which are awarded more state funding for research. 11 of the 12 benchmarks must be met for a school to be classified as Preeminent by the Board of Governors. The benchmarks are:

- An average weighted grade point average of 4.0 or higher on a 4.0 scale and an average SAT score of 1200 or higher on a 1600-point scale or an average ACT score of 25 or higher on a 36 score scale, using the latest published national concordance table developed jointly by the College Board and ACT, Inc., for fall semester incoming freshmen, as reported annually.
- A top-50 ranking on at least two well-known and highly respected national public university rankings, including, but not limited to, the U.S. News & World Report rankings, reflecting national preeminence, using most recent rankings.
- A freshman retention rate of 90 percent or higher for full-time, first-time-in-college students.
- A 4-year graduation rate of 60 percent or higher for full-time, first-time-in-college students.
- Six or more faculty members at the state university who are members of a national academy.
- Total annual research expenditures, including federal research expenditures, of $200 million or more.
- Total annual research expenditures in diversified nonmedical sciences of $150 million or more.
- A top-100 university national ranking for research expenditures in five or more science, technology, engineering, or mathematics fields of study.
- One hundred or more total patents awarded by the United States Patent and Trademark Office for the most recent 3-year period.
- Four hundred or more doctoral degrees awarded annually, including professional doctoral degrees awarded in medical and health care disciplines.
- Two hundred or more postdoctoral appointees annually.
- An endowment of $500 million or more.

Currently, three universities are classified as preeminent: the University of Florida, Florida State University, and the University of South Florida. All three have exceeded each of the 12 benchmarks.

== Former members of the board ==
Name	Profession	Education	Term start	Projected term end
H. Wayne Huizenga Jr.	businessman		January 10, 2013	January 6, 2027
Darlene L. Jordan	former attorney	BA (Fordham), JD (Suffolk)	June 22, 2017	January 6, 2024
Sydney Kitson, Chair	real estate developer		June 22, 2017	January 6, 2024
Kent Stermon	COO, Total Military Management		March 29, 2019	December 8, 2022
Richard Corcoran	attorney	BA (St Leo), JD (Regent)	May 26, 2022	January 6, 2024
Steven M. Scott	physician and entrepreneur	MD (Indiana)	March 29, 2019	January 6, 2026
Patricia Frost	retired school principal	BA (Colby), MA (Columbia)	October 27, 2017	January 6, 2024
Brian Lamb	business executive	BA, MBA (USF)	March 29, 2019	January 6, 2026
Jose Oliva	politician, businessman		January 4, 2023	January 6, 2026
Paul Renner	politician, lawyer	BA (Davidson College), JD UF	April 14, 2025	January 6, 2013
Eric Silagy	President & CEO, Florida Power & Light	BA (UT Austin), JD (Georgetown)	March 29, 2019	January 6, 2026

== See also ==
- State University System of Florida
- University Press of Florida
- State University System of Florida Libraries
- Florida Institute of Oceanography
- Florida Board of Control

Preceded by Florida Board of Regents	Governing Body for the State University System of Florida; 2003–present	Succeeded by NA
