= Florida Board of Regents =

Former university governing body in Florida

- Type: Governing Board
- Established: 1965
- Location: Tallahassee, Florida, US

The Florida Board of Regents was from 1965 to 2001 the governing body for the State University System of Florida, which includes all public universities in the state of Florida, United States. It was created to replace a predecessor body called the Florida Board of Control, which had existed from 1905. Its powers are now held by the Florida Board of Governors.

The Board of Regents was established in the Florida Statutes, Title XVI, Chapter 240, Part II.

== Function ==
The Board of Regents had the responsibility for adopting system-wide rules and policies; planning for the future needs of the State University System; planning the programmatic, financial and physical development of the system; reviewing and evaluating the instructional, research, and service programs at the universities; coordinating program development among the universities; and monitoring the fiscal performance of the universities." (Title XVI Chapter 240.209, The 2000 Florida Statutes)

== Composition ==
The Board of Regents had a total of 14 members, 13 of which were appointed by the governor, and one who was the commissioner of education. One of the members appointed by the governor had to be a full-time student of the state university system; historically, Florida governors gave great weight to the recommendation of the Florida Student Association in filling that seat. The governor's appointments had to be approved by the Cabinet and the Senate. The commissioner of education and the full-time student served for one year. while all other members served for six years. Excluding the full-time student member and the commissioner of education, no county could house two regents except for counties with over 900,000 residents.

The regents were not paid; however, they were reimbursed for expenses incurred as a result of fulfilling their role, such as travel expenses. The board appointed a chancellor to serve as its chief administrative officer.

== Institutions founded or incorporated ==
- Florida International University (1965)
- Florida Institute of Oceanography (1967)
- University of North Florida (1969)
- University Press of Florida (1973)
- New College of Florida (1975)
- Florida Student Association (1976)
- Florida Gulf Coast University (1991)

== Dissolution and succession ==
In April 2000, the Florida House of Representatives voted 81-29 to abolish the Florida Board of Regents.

The Board of Regents hindered efforts by Governor Jeb Bush and the Republican-controlled legislature to end affirmative action in Florida's public universities, and it was consequently abolished by an act of the state legislature which was signed into law by Governor Bush on July 1, 2001. The powers held by the Board of Regents were then divided between the Florida Board of Education (which was given some authority over all levels of public education in the state), and appointed boards of trustees, which operated independently for each separate institution.

Bob Graham, a United States senator from Florida, objected to the abolition of the statewide body, and responded by leading a ballot initiative to restore it through an amendment to the Florida Constitution. This initiative succeeded in creating what is now called the Florida Board of Governors. As it is ensconced in the Florida Constitution, this new body cannot be abolished by the legislature without another constitutional amendment.

Preceded by Florida Board of Control	Governing Body for the State University System of Florida; 1965–2001	Succeeded by Florida Board of Governors
