= Florida Student Association =

Non-profit corporation

- Abbreviation: FSA
- Formation: November 17, 1976; 49 years ago
- Type: Nonprofit corporation
- Tax ID no.: 59-1673603
- Registration no.: 737328
- Legal status: Active
- Chair: Ian Seibert
- Executive Director: Jonus Goldstein
- Affiliations: State University System of Florida
- Website: www.floridastudentassociation.com

Florida Student Association was formed in 1976 and is a non-profit corporation composed of the student body presidents from each of the twelve State University System of Florida universities.

Florida Student Association, Inc. (FSA) was formed in 1976 under the "Florida Not For Profit Corporation Act". FSA represents the interests of about 400,000 students of the State University System of Florida. A statute enacted by the state legislature of Florida has created a "student government" at each state university. The statute provides that each student government shall have a "student body president". FSA's board of directors includes the student body president of each state university student government. FSA's board of directors exercises the corporation's powers and manages its affairs.

== Current Members ==
Universities				
University	Location	Established	Enrollment (Fall 2024)	Student Body President for 2026–2027
Florida A&M University	Tallahassee, Florida	1887	8,972	Kennedy Williams
Florida Atlantic University	Boca Raton, Florida	1961	30,246	Lance Moore
Florida Gulf Coast University	Fort Myers, Florida	1991	16,800	Robert Krampen
Florida International University	Miami, Florida	1965	48,696	Aly Mederos
Florida Polytechnic University	Lakeland, Florida	2012	1,766	Colby Manrodt
Florida State University	Tallahassee, Florida	1851	42,945	Ian Seibert
New College of Florida	Sarasota, Florida	1960	872	TBD
University of Central Florida	Orlando, Florida	1963	69,067	Shivani Vakharia
University of Florida	Gainesville, Florida	1853	58,933	Matthew Bravo
University of North Florida	Jacksonville, Florida	1969	15,732	Hazel Joseph
University of South Florida	Tampa, Florida	1956	47,906	Hunter Rabinowitz
University of West Florida	Pensacola, Florida	1963	13,851	Eli Schatz

== State University System ==
The universities represented in the Florida Student Association are those that are in the State University System of the State of Florida. The System is completely separate from the Florida Department of Education and State Board of Education, who control K-20, college, workforce and technical, blind, and VPK education. Since the inception of the U.S. News & World Report rankings of state University Systems, the publication has named Florida the No. 1 State University System in the United States. In 2025, Governor Ron DeSantis recommended the Focus on Fiscal Responsibility 2025–2026 Budget, which allocated $3.9 billion to the State University System.

== Florida Board of Governors ==
The FSA chair and president serves as a member of the Florida Board of Governors without compensation but may be reimbursed for travel and per diem expenses to the extent provided by law.

The Florida Board of Governors is a governing board that serves as the governing body for the State University System of Florida, which includes all public universities in the state of Florida. The board of governors has seventeen members, fourteen of whom are appointed by the Florida governor and confirmed by the Florida Senate for a term of seven years. The remaining members include the chair of the Advisory Council of Faculty Senates, the commissioner of the Florida Department of Education, and the chair of the Florida Student Association.

After its predecessor, the Florida Board of Regents, was abolished by an act of the Florida Legislature that was signed into law by Governor Jeb Bush in July 2001, United States senator Bob Graham, who objected to the abolition of the statewide higher education body (Board of Regents), responded by leading a ballot initiative to restore it. The board of governors was established in 2003 after the successful passage of the constitutional amendment heralded by Graham in 2002. The board of governors, as part of the Florida Constitution, cannot be abolished without another constitutional amendment.

Past student members of the Florida Board of Governors	Institution	Year
Carson Dale	Florida State University	2025–2026
John Brinkman	University of Florida	2024–2025
Jack Hitchcock	Florida State University	2023–2024
Nimna Gabadage	Florida State University	2022–2023
Nastassia Janvier	Florida State University	2021–2022
Ally Schneider	University of North Florida	2020–2021
Zenani Johnson	University of West Florida	2019–2020
Jalisa White	Florida Gulf Coast University	2018–2019
Kishane Patel	University of West Florida	2017–2018
Jacob Hebert	University of West Florida	2016–2017
Tonnette Graham	Florida A&M University	2015–2016
Stefano Cavallaro	Florida State University	2014–2015

== Financial Aid Appeals Committee ==
An applicant for state student financial aid may appeal the rejection of their application. The appeal will be heard by a committee of four members appointed by the Florida Commissioner of Education. A decision rendered by an appeals committee constitutes "final agency action".

An appeals committee is temporary in nature. There might be no appeals committees in existence at a particular time or there might be several appeals committees, with each committee being assigned to evaluate one or more appeals.

FSA is authorized by law to nominate students to serve as members of appeals committees. Each nominee must be enrolled in a public postsecondary institution in Florida.

== Rally in Tally ==
The Florida Student Association holds an annual gathering in Tallahassee called Rally in Tally. Students travel from each of the twelve universities in teams to lobby the Florida Legislature regarding education issues and concerns. Past speakers at Rally in Tally events include Mayor John E. Dailey, Sean Pittman, Amber Mariano (politician), Tim Cerio, and more.

== Lobbying ==
FSA is authorized by law to "Adopt, change, amend, and repeal bylaws, not inconsistent with law or its articles of incorporation, for the administration of the affairs of the corporation and the exercise of its corporate powers". FSA has adopted a bylaw which provides, in part, that "the activities of the corporation shall include the carrying on of lobbying efforts and otherwise attempting to influence legislation".

In 2022, the Florida Student Association lobbied for the return of the $600 Bright Futures Book Stipend, increased resources even the statewide distribution of Title IX officers, a vast increase in mental health resources, and the installment of the Open Educational Resources. From the same session, Gov. Ron DeSantis signed a record $396 million for school safety and mental health initiatives.

In 2019, the Florida Student Association partnered with Representative Mel Ponder (R) and Senator Anitere Flores (R) to pass House Bill 3419, which would have provided additional funding to homelessness and food insecurity programs on college campuses. This bill eventually died in the Appropriations Committee. FSA also tried to partner with Mike Caruso (R) to eliminate the tax on college textbooks and other instructional materials. The Florida Student Association lobbied successfully for the expansion of Florida's Medical Amnesty laws, which will protect those who call for assistance during an alcohol and drug overdose across the state through HB 595.

FSA was a driving force in the effort to create the "Florida Prepaid College Program". In 1985, FSA asked key Florida legislators to review the State of Michigan's prepaid tuition plan. After reviewing Michigan's plan, Florida State Senator Ileana Ros-Lehtinen sponsored a bill to establish a similar prepaid tuition plan in Florida. With lobbying efforts by student government presidents and David Corry (FSA Executive Director) and Shari Caprara (FSA Legislative Director), the Florida House of Representatives and the Florida Senate both passed the bill. The bill was then signed into law by Florida Governor Bob Martinez. Since that bill became Florida law, more than 1.6 million prepaid college plans have been purchased and nearly 350,000 students have attended college under a prepaid college plan. Most of the plans were purchased by parents and grandparents when their children/grandchildren were toddlers.

== See also ==
- Advisory Council of Faculty Senates
- Florida Board of Governors
- Florida College System Activities Association
- State University System of Florida
- Florida College System
