= P. K. Yonge =

American businessman

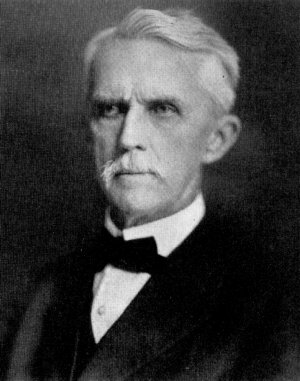
P.K. Yonge

Philip Keyes Yonge (May 27, 1850 – August 9, 1934), usually given as P. K. Yonge, was a businessman and civic leader. A resident of Pensacola, he was a prominent Floridian. A founding member of the Florida Board of Control (the governing body of the State University System of Florida, Florida's public university system), he served on that board for almost 30 years as a member and chairman. The P.K. Yonge Developmental Research School in Gainesville is named for him.

Yonge was associated with the Southern State Lumber Company and its predecessors and served as president and manager of the corporation. The company was one of Florida's largest lumber firms at the time, with its headquarters in Pensacola.

An active citizen of Pensacola for nearly half a century, Yonge served as alderman from 1905 to 1909, and was president of the Chamber of Commerce in 1908. He received his LL. D. degree from the University of Florida in 1921. He was Phi Kappa Phi at the University of Florida, Phi Beta Kappa at the University of Georgia and a member of the Independent Order of Odd Fellows.

== Yonge family history in Georgia and Florida ==
P. K. Yonge was the son of Chandler Cox Yonge, a distinguished lawyer and public leader. Yonge's ancestor, Henry Yonge, Sr., (b. 1713, London) emigrated from England to South Carolina, where he pursued a career as a surveyor. In 1754, Henry, along with William Gerard de Brahm, was appointed Joint Surveyor of Georgia, and later became Surveyor General of the province. He served in the lower house of the General Assembly and as a member of the Governor's Council. His son, Henry Yonge, Jr., had begun a career in law but because of his Loyalist leanings was forced to leave Georgia when the American Revolution broke out in 1776. He made his way to St. Augustine, capital of East Florida, where he gained employment in service of the Crown, serving as acting Attorney General; and eventually being appointed Secretary and Registrar General of the Bahamas in 1788. Because of his Loyalist sympathies, in 1778 Henry Yonge, Sr., with his sons Philip and William John, was banished from Georgia as well by the rebel usurpers of the colony's government. They took a ship headed to the Bahamas, but it was seized by a British privateer who conveyed them to St. Augustine.

P. K. Yonge's father, Chandler Cox Yonge, was born at Fernandina in 1818, when it was still a Spanish possession. The elder Yonge became a lawyer and was only twenty years old when he served as assistant secretary of the first Florida constitutional convention held in 1838 at St. Joseph. In 1843, Chandler Yonge was elected to the Florida state senate, and in 1845 he was appointed by President Polk as the United States district attorney for Florida. When Florida seceded and joined the Confederacy he served in the same capacity for the Confederate States; later he was commissioned as a quartermaster in the Confederate Army with the rank of major and stationed at Tallahassee.

== Early years ==
Chandler Yonge's son, Philip Keyes Yonge, was born on May 27, 1850, in Marianna, Florida. In 1859, the family moved to Pensacola, where both men spent the rest of their lives. P. K. Yonge was educated by tutors and in private schools, and finished his education at the University of Georgia at Athens. He attended the University of Georgia, his father's alma mater, receiving a Bachelor's degree in 1871, and his Master of Arts and Bachelor of Laws degrees in 1872. He was scholarly enough to be elected a member of the national honor society, Phi Beta Kappa. He served as British vice consul's clerk at Pensacola in 1872–73, and as acting British vice consul in 1873–74. By 1875 Yonge was engaged in the real estate and insurance business rather than the practice of law, and in 1876, he got into lumber manufacture and export, in which he was active for over fifty years. On December 13, 1876, he married Lucie C. Davis at Pensacola.

== Career in the timber and lumber industry and public service ==
In 1876, P. K. Yonge became secretary of the Muscogee Lumber Company, a position he held until 1889 when the business was taken over by the Southern States Land & Timber Company, of which he was made corporate assistant manager and manager of its New York office. In 1892 he was appointed superintendent of the company's Muscogee Mills; when the Southern States Land & Timber Company went into receivership in 1895, he was appointed agent for the receivers and had full charge of company affairs until 1898 when the Southern States Lumber Company was organized to take over the business. In that year Yonge was elected vice president and general manager of the company and in 1903 he became its president, a position he held until 1930, when all the timber on its land, over 400,000 acres, had been cut, and the company was dissolved. He then retired from business at age eighty.

Yonge founded a demonstration farm and ranch called Magnolia Farms in 1899, located twenty miles northwest of Pensacola along the Perdido River near Muscogee, but just over the Alabama state line. This enterprise was owned by the Southern States Lumber Company under the supervision of himself and Oscar Williams, its superintendent, and later included a dairy that eventually developed one of the South's premier herds of Jersey dairy cattle.

With consolidation of Florida state schools in 1905, Yonge was appointed a member of their Board of Control, the governing body of the state university system of Florida. He served, except for one term, until his retirement in 1933 at the age of eighty-three, and was its chairman for the last twenty years.

== Florida Historical Society and later years ==
P. K. Yonge was a charter member of the reorganized Florida Historical Society in 1902 and served as its president from 1932 until his death in 1934. He was an active collector of Florida historical materials and assembled a vast collection of books and documents that his son, Julien C. Yonge, inherited and further expanded. Julien Yonge later donated the collection, which formed the nucleus of the P.K. Yonge Library of Florida History, to the University of Florida.

Yonge's wife, Lucie C. Davis, died in 1932. A life-long member of the Episcopal Church, he was survived by five of his nine children. Yonge died in Pensacola on August 9, 1934, and was buried there in St. Michael's cemetery

P. K. Yonge was designated a Great Floridian by the Florida Department of State in the Great Floridians 2000 Program. A plaque attesting to the honor is located at the Florida Department of Law Enforcement (formerly the P.K. Yonge School), on Palafox Street in Pensacola.
