= Philipp Schweighauser =

Swiss literary scholar

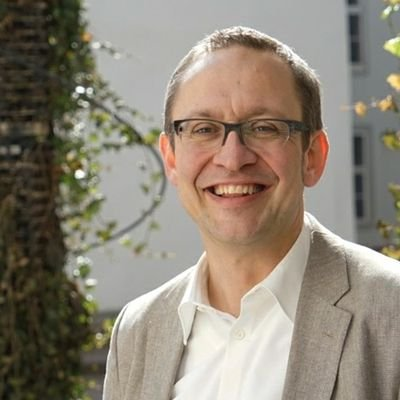
- Born: Basel, Switzerland
- Education: University of Basel
- Occupations: Literary scholar and writer

Philipp Schweighauser is a Swiss literary scholar and professor of North American and General Literature at the University of Basel.

== Biography ==
Schweighauser studied English and German Literature and Linguistics at the University of Basel, where he also received his doctorate in 2003, for a thesis that introduced the notion of 'literary acoustics': The Noises of American Literature, 1890-1985: Toward a History of Literary Acoustics. His second book, Beautiful Deceptions: European Aesthetics, the Early American Novel, and Illusionist Art, published in 2016, establishes connections between the early American novel and the emergence of aesthetics in Europe. He was Senior Lecturer at the University of Bern from 2003 to 2007 and Christian-Gottlob-Heyne Assistant Professor of American Studies at Georg August University of Göttingen from 2007 to 2009. In 2009, he was appointed Assistant Professor (with tenure track) of North American and General Literature at the University of Basel. In 2013, he was promoted to Associate Professor and to Full Professor in 2019. From 2012 to 2020, Schweighauser served as President of the Swiss Association for North American Studies. He was a research associate at the University of California, Irvine and a visiting scholar at Harvard University and Boston University. In 2022, he published his third book Boasian Verse: The Poetic and Ethnographic Work of Edward Sapir, Ruth Benedict, and Margaret Mead, dealing with the poetry and anthropological work of the three titular individuals.

== Research work ==
Schweighauser's research areas include 18th to 21st century American literature and culture, literary history, literary, cultural, and media theory, literature and science, literature and anthropology, life writing, sound studies and aesthetics.

- "Anglo Genres for Atlantic Futures: Contemporary Eco-Fictions, Campus Novels, and Science Fictions," funded by Zaeslin-Bustany Foundation, 2025-2029
- "Beckett's Media System: A Comparative Study in Multimediality," funded by the Swiss National Science Foundation, 2015-2019
- "Of Cultural, Poetic, and Medial Alterity: The Scholarship, Poetry, Photographs, and Films of Edward Sapir, Ruth Fulton Benedict, and Margaret Mead," funded by the Swiss National Science Foundation, 2014-2017

== Publications ==
=== Books ===
- Boasian Verse: The Poetic and Ethnographic Work of Edward Sapir, Ruth Benedict, and Margaret Mead. New York: Routledge, 2022. ISBN 978-1-032-21141-1
- Beautiful Deceptions: European Aesthetics, the Early American Novel, and Illusionist Art. Charlottesville: University of Virginia Press, 2016. ISBN 978-0-813-93903-2
- The Noises of American Literature, 1890-1985: Toward a History of Literary Acoustics. Gainesville: University Press of Florida, 2006. ISBN 978-0-813-02947-4

=== Edited books ===
- Boasian Aesthetics: American Poetry, Visual Culture, and Cultural Anthropology (ed., with Gabriele Rippl, Silvy Chakkalakal and A. Elisabeth Reichel). Special issue Amerikastudien/American Studies 63.4 (2018).
- Literatur und Politische Philosophie: Subjektivität, Fremdheit, Demokratie (ed., with Michael G. Festl). Paderborn: Wilhelm Fink, 2018.
- Literature, Ethics, Morality: American Studies Perspectives (ed., with Ridvan Askin). Tübingen: Gunter Narr, 2015.
- Aesthetics in the 21st Century (ed., with Ridvan Askin, Paul J. Ennis and Andreas Hägler). Special issue Speculations V (2014).
- Haunted Narratives: Life Writing in an Age of Trauma (ed., with Gabriele Rippl, Tiina Kirss, Margit Sutrop and Therese Steffen). Toronto: University of Toronto Press, 2013.
- Terrorism, Media, and the Ethics of Fiction: Transatlantic Perspectives on Don DeLillo (ed., with Peter Schneck). New York: Continuum, 2010.
- Teaching Nineteenth-Century American Poetry (ed., with Paula Bernat Bennett and Karen L. Kilcup). New York: MLA, 2007.
