= Advisory Council of Faculty Senates =

Non-partisan organization in Florida, US

- Type: Faculty Association
- Affiliations: The State University System of Florida
- Location: Tallahassee, Florida, USA
- Website: Official website

The Advisory Council of Faculty Senates (ACFS) is a non-partisan statewide organization of university faculty members formed to represent the interests of all faculty members working for the State University System of Florida.

== Membership ==
ACFS membership consists of two representatives from the faculty senate of each public university in the state, one of whom is typically thechair of the constituent university's faculty senate and thus serves on that university's board of trustees. The chair of the ACFS serves on the Florida Board of Governors.

== See also ==
- Florida Student Association
- Florida Board of Governors
- State University System of Florida
