= Kent Stermon =

American political figure (1972–2022)

- Born: Kent Stermon; January 24, 1972; Collinsville, Illinois, U.S.
- Died: December 8, 2022 (aged 50); Atlantic Beach, Florida, U.S.
- Cause of death: Suicide by gunshot

Kent Stermon (January 24, 1972 – December 8, 2022) was a Florida businessman and Republican activist. He was a political associate and friend of Ron DeSantis, who appointed Stermon to the Florida Board of Governors in 2019. He died by suicide following sexual misconduct allegations.

== Early life and career ==
Kent Stermon was born in Collinsville, Illinois, on January 24, 1972. He received his bachelor's degree in finance from Georgia State University. Stermon's college roommate was former Florida representative Travis Cummings.

== Jacksonville politics ==
Stermon cultivated relationships with members of the Jacksonville Sheriff's Office (JSO). He was given badges allowing him access to the JSO headquarters by three consecutive Republican sheriffs, beginning with current congressman John Rutherford in 2013. He was particularly close with Chief Mike Williams, another of the sheriffs who renewed his access to the JSO headquarters.

In the weeks before his death, Stermon's access to JSO facilities became a public controversy. It was learned that Stermon had used his badges more than 700 times—far more frequently than any others with JSO headquarter access—including multiple accesses after normal business hours. Current Jacksonville Sheriff T. K. Waters no longer allows “special access to individuals outside of the need for official business.” Stermon was also an ally of Jacksonville Mayor Lenny Curry. In a since-deleted tweet in December 2022, Mayor Curry defended Stermon against local lawyer John Phillips, who tweeted about potential changes to Stermon's badge access to JSO headquarters. Curry called Phillips a "media [expletive] with no compass" and told him to "pound sand, chump," saying that he felt "compelled to reply" since Phillips mentioned ‘[his] friend, Kent.’ Phillips also owns the Jacksonville-based publication Folio Weekly, which published a piece critical of Stermon and sheriff Mike Williams in June 2022.

Stermon was a member of the host committee of the 2020 Republican National Convention.

== Relationship with Ron DeSantis ==
In 2019, Florida Trend listed Stermon as one of six individuals in DeSantis’ inner circle, along with Casey DeSantis, Matt Gaetz, Richard Corcoran, Byron Donalds, and Susie Wiles, calling him "one of DeSantis' closest friends". Stermon's citation in a 2020 listing of the most influential people in Florida politics read "It's good to be the governor's bestie".

Of the $140,000 Stermon has spent in political contributions in the state of Florida, more than $60,000 has gone to Ron DeSantis's political operations. He is considered the most high-profile of DeSantis's longtime donors. Stermon "told the Times/Herald that he and DeSantis became friends through mutual social circles in Jacksonville nearly 10 years ago, before DeSantis ran for Congress, and he's since helped DeSantis' campaigns as a 'labor of love'".

From July to November 2016, when DeSantis needed to change residency due to federal congressional redistricting, he rented a Flagler Beach condo owned by Stermon. After DeSantis announced his campaign for governor, Stermon hosted an early fundraiser and was appointed to his transition team. In October 2019, Casey DeSantis took a controversial trip from Tallahassee to Jacksonville by private jet to attend a Republican party fundraiser hosted by Stermon’s company, TMM.

In 2019, Governor DeSantis appointed Stermon to the Florida Board of Governors, which oversees the state university system.

== Sexual misconduct allegations ==
In November 2022, Stermon engaged in a sextortion scheme, offering a young family friend backstage access to Taylor Swift in exchange for nude photos. On November 18, 2022, the victim went to Stermon's office, where he detained her and demanded favors. On November 29, 2022, Stermon met with the victim and her father at Panera. Following a confrontation, Stermon fled, and police were informed.

The State Attorney's office released its report in September 2023. It concludes that Stermon "would have been charged with the criminal offenses of solicitation for prostitution, false imprisonment, theft by false pretenses, unlawful use of a two-way communications device and obtaining by false representation".

== Death ==
On Thursday, December 8, 2022, Stermon died by suicide. He shot himself in his truck at the Atlantic Beach post office. He left a suicide note. Earlier in the week, he had been hospitalized for a stroke.
