= University Press of Florida =

Scholarly publishing arm of the State University System of Florida

Coordinates: 29.6725°N 82.2991°W

- Parent company: State University System of Florida
- Founded: University of Florida Press founded in 1945; University Press of Florida founded in 1973
- Country of origin: United States
- Headquarters location: Gainesville, Florida, U.S.
- Distribution: self-distributed (United States); Scholarly Book Services (Canada); Eurospan Group (EMEA)
- Key people: Meredith Morris-Babb, Dean
- Publication types: books, journals
- Official website: floridapress.org

The University Press of Florida (UPF) is the scholarly publishing arm of the State University System of Florida, representing Florida's twelve state universities. It is located in Gainesville near the University of Florida, one of the state's major research institutions. It is overseen by the Florida Board of Governors and publishes works from and about the state. Its predecessor was the University of Florida Press.

== History ==
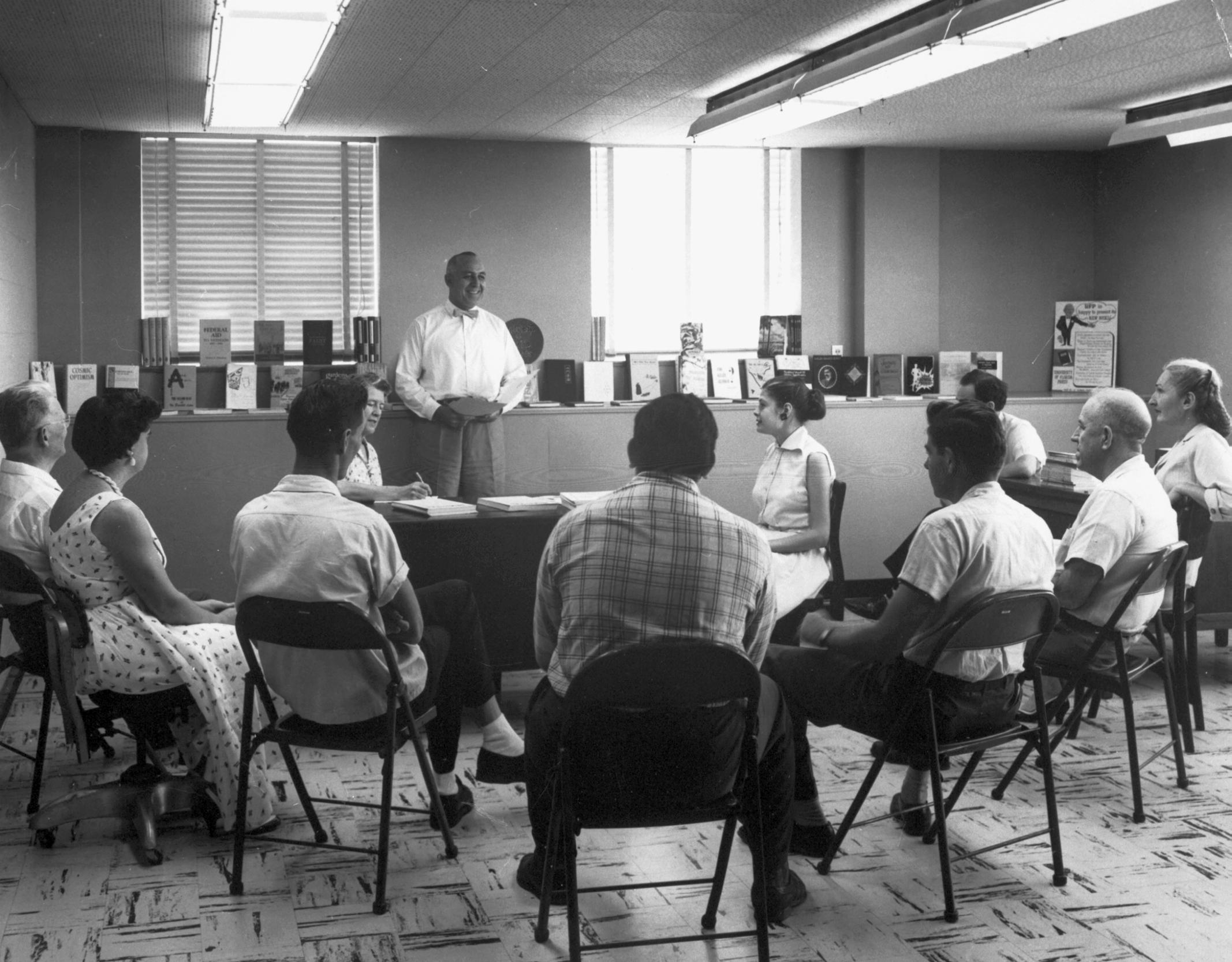
University of Florida Press

Founded in 1945 and located in Gainesville, Florida, about four miles from the main campus of the University of Florida, the University Press of Florida is the oldest book publisher in the state and one of the largest university presses in the Southeast. It was founded as the University of Florida Press with a commitment to books about the region, as exemplified by its first title, Florida Under Five Flags, a centennial history of the state by Rembert Patrick. UPF has published almost 2,500 volumes with a staff of 41. It has undergone a total conversion to electronic editing and production and boasts efficient schedules and procedures in place to release about 100 new titles each year in the areas of international studies, archaeology, dance, history, literature, political science, and many others. A member of the Association of University Presses, UPF ranks in the top-third of member presses for sales and new title production.

As UPF's predecessor, the University of Florida Press, began to build a successful publishing program, other public universities in Florida took notice and established presses of their own. To avoid replication of efforts among the campuses, the Florida Board of Regents established a decentralized, system-wide consortium in 1973 that was known as the University Presses of Florida. Featuring independent editorial and financial controls on each of the state system's nine campuses, this structure brought all of the state's public universities into the publishing process.

By the early 1990s a need became apparent for one central authority that could refocus and unify the consortium’s publishing program, and the press was again reconfigured. The consortium of presses became University Press of Florida, a single press for the Florida State University System, with a single editorial board, a single imprint, and a single budget for which the director is responsible. Today the UPF serves Florida A&M University, Florida Atlantic University, Florida Gulf Coast University, Florida International University, Florida State University, New College of Florida, University of Central Florida, University of North Florida, University of South Florida, University of West Florida, and the University of Florida.

Throughout the changes in organization, the press has maintained its status as the premier publisher of scholarly and general interest books in the state of Florida. Reflecting the quality and scope of UPF’s list, books from the press have received awards from many academic organizations as well as Choice Outstanding Book and Association of University Presses design awards. Others have been named to Amazon.com’s best-seller list and chosen for book clubs. Both academic and general interest books have received accolades from national and international media, from starred reviews in Publishers Weekly and a featured essay in the New York Times Book Review to major attention from the New York Review of Books, the Times Literary Supplement, Village Voice, The Nation, Playboy, Oxford American, and various wire services. In 2006, UPF was hailed as a "publishing powerhouse" by the Gainesville Sun.

== Directors ==
Term	Director
1945–1967	Lewis F Haines
1967–1978	William B. Harvey
1978–1987	Phillip Martin
1987–1994	George C. Bedell
1994–2004	Kenneth J. Scott
2005–2019	Meredith Morris-Babb
2019–present	Romi Gutierrez

== Publications ==
Current publications by UPF can be found on the UPF website. UPF also publishes Orange Grove Texts Plus (OGT+) which are Open Access textbooks, and are available in an Open Access repository powered by the SobekCM Open Source software. Additionally, UPF and UPF authors in some cases have granted materials for their publications to be available as Open Access, and many are available from the University of Florida Digital Collections.

== See also ==
- List of English-language book publishing companies
- List of university presses
- Florida Board of Governors
- State University System of Florida
