= Boyd Henry Bode =

American educator and philosopher

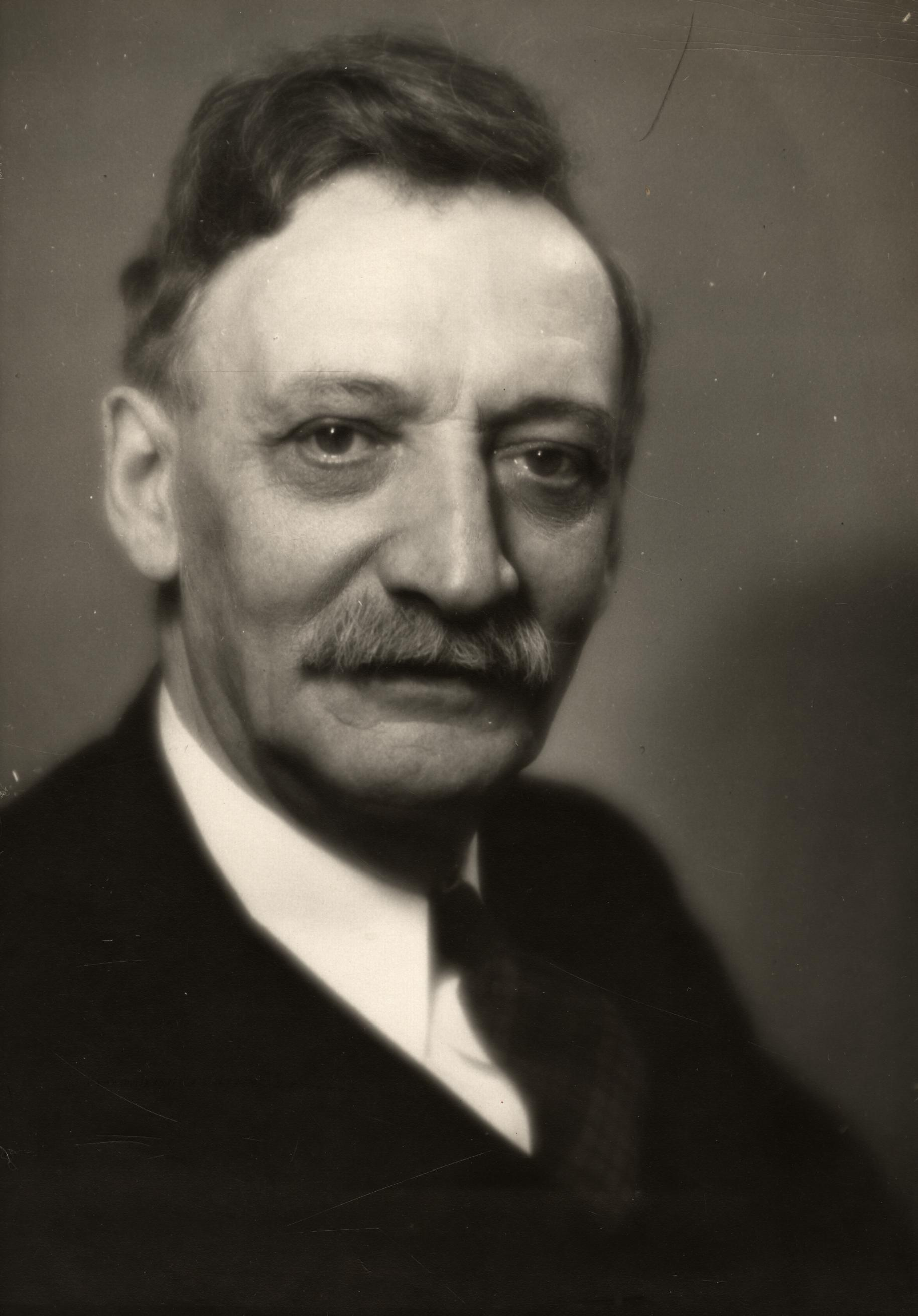
- Born: October 4, 1873; Ridott, Illinois, U.S.
- Died: March 29, 1953 (aged 79); Gainesville, Florida, U.S.

Boyd Henry Bode (October 4, 1873 – March 29, 1953) was an American philosopher, notable for his work on philosophy of education.

== Life ==
Bode was born in Ridott, Illinois. He grew up in rural areas of Iowa and South Dakota and attended William Penn College in Iowa (where he graduated with a Bachelor of Arts in 1896), and later the University of Michigan (where he graduated with a Bachelor of Arts in 1897), and Cornell University (where he received his Ph.D. in 1900).

Bode became assistant professor of philosophy at the University of Wisconsin–Madison (1900–1909) and was later appointed professor of philosophy at University of Illinois at Urbana-Champaign (1909–1921). From 1911 to 1912 Bode served as vice president of the American Philosophical Association. In 1910 Bode published An Outline of Logic.

In 1921 Bode became professor of education at Ohio State University. There Bode wrote on philosophy of education and authored Fundamentals of Education (1921), Modern Educational Theories (1927), Conflicting Psychologies of Learning (1929), Democracy as a Way of Life (1937), Progressive Education at the Crossroads (1938), and How We Learn (1940). He agreed with many of the ideas of John Dewey, especially on pragmatism.

Bode retired in 1944. He died in 1953 in Gainesville, Florida.
