= Robert B. Mautz =

Robert Mautz
- Born: January 22, 1915; Marion, Ohio
- Died: March 21, 1996 (aged 81); Gainesville, Florida
- Education: Yale University
- Occupation: Academic Administrator

Robert Barbeau Mautz (January 22, 1915 – March 21, 1996) was an American university administrator. Mautz was chancellor of the State University System of Florida, serving from 1968 to 1975.

Mautz was born and raised in Ohio. He earned a bachelor's degree in law from Yale University in 1940.

Before becoming chancellor, Mautz served as an academic administrator at the University of Florida for eighteen years, rising to become the vice president of academic affairs before he was appointed chancellor of the State University System.

Mautz was also an Air Force Reserve Major General (Ret)

Mautz died in Gainesville, Florida on March 21, 1996; he was 81 years old.
