= Florida Institute of Oceanography =

- Other name: FIO
- Type: Public
- Established: 1967
- Parent institution: The State University System of Florida
- Director: Monty Graham
- Administrative staff: 10
- Location: St. Petersburg, Florida, U.S.
- Campus: USF St. Petersburg
- Website: www.fio.usf.edu

The Florida Institute of Oceanography (FIO), located on the campus of the University of South Florida St. Petersburg, is an entity of the State University System of Florida that works collaboratively with 32 institutions and agencies from across the state that support marine research.

== Facilities ==
The FIO operates several smaller ships, as well as two research vessels. The flagship of the institute is R/V Weatherbird II, a 115-foot, 194-ton vessel, that was acquired and renovated in 2009, and soon made national headlines as one of the most active research vessels during the 2010 Deepwater Horizon oil spill.

In 2017, FIO launched R/V W.T. Hogarth, a state of the art research vessel replacing the nearly 50-year-old R/V Bellows which had served as a floating laboratory for 35 years. The R/V W.T. Hogarth was named after Dr. William T. Hogarth, who served as the director of the FIO until his retirement in 2016.

Since 1990, it manages the Keys Marine Laboratory on Long Key.

== Members ==
The institute is governed by the FIO Council. Council members serve two-year terms and are active members of the Florida oceanographic science and education community. In addition to advising the FIO leadership regarding statewide collaboration in oceanographic science and education, the council's key duty is to plan and align legislative budget requests with strategic priorities.

== Research ==
Since the 1960s, the Florida Institute of Oceanography has unified marine science interests across Florida in the cause of understanding and stewardship of the coastal oceans. FIO has taken a leading national role in the scientific assessment of the impact of the Deepwater Horizon oil spill in the Gulf of Mexico.

FIO has emerged as a key research organization on the effects of the Deepwater Horizon oil spill with the award of $10 million from the oil company BP. In an application process which began in June 2010, the FIO received more than 200 proposals from researchers totaling more than $60 million.

To apply for funding, scientists were asked to develop research proposals related to the following scientific priorities in spill research:

Determine the properties, distribution, and extent of the oil spill and dispersants.
Conduct baseline studies and impact assessments to provide the basis for long-term monitoring.
Contribute to an integrated coastal and ocean observing system, and improve modeling capabilities for forecasting environmental impacts related to the oil spill.
Develop and implement systems for data integration, synthesis, sharing, and dissemination.
Develop and implement strategies to protect and restore habitats and species.
Priority will be given to projects that are collaborative between two or more FIO members and/or the Northern Gulf Institute and Louisiana State University, which also received BP funding for initial research.
