= Florida Polytechnic University =

Public university in Lakeland, Florida, US

Coordinates: 28°08′41.2″N 81°51′03.1″W

- Former names: University of South Florida Lakeland (1988-2008); University of South Florida Polytechnic (2008-2012)
- Motto: "Technology, Engineering, Industry"
- Type: Public university
- Established: April 20, 2012; 14 years ago
- Parent institution: State University System of Florida
- Accreditation: SACS
- Academic affiliations: Space-grant
- Endowment: $5.25 million (2025)
- President: Devin Stephenson
- Provost: Brad Thiessen
- Faculty: 118
- Administrative staff: 180
- Students: 1,884 (spring 2026)
- Location: Lakeland, Florida, United States
- Campus: 531 acres (2.15 km^{2}); Fringe rural
- Media: Layers
- Colors: Poly Purple
- Mascot: Phoenix
- Website: https://floridapoly.edu

Florida Polytechnic University (Florida Poly) is a public university in Lakeland, Florida, United States. Created as an independent university in 2012, it is the newest of the 12 institutions in the State University System of Florida. It is the state's only public polytechnic university, and focuses solely on STEM education.

The institution originated as a branch campus of the University of South Florida, which opened in 1988. The State of Florida authorized a new campus in 2008, and renamed the school University of South Florida Polytechnic. In 2012, the Florida Legislature initiated plans to dissolve the USF branch campus and reform the Lakeland institution into an independent school. Florida Poly opened for classes on August 25, 2014, with an inaugural class of 554 students.

Florida Poly resides on a 170-acre campus. The university's Innovation, Science and Technology (IST) Building, designed by architect Santiago Calatrava, is home to a 3D printing lab, cyber gaming and media lab, cyber security lab, robotics lab, and a big data lab. In addition, Florida Poly is the first university whose campus library is completely digital.

== History ==
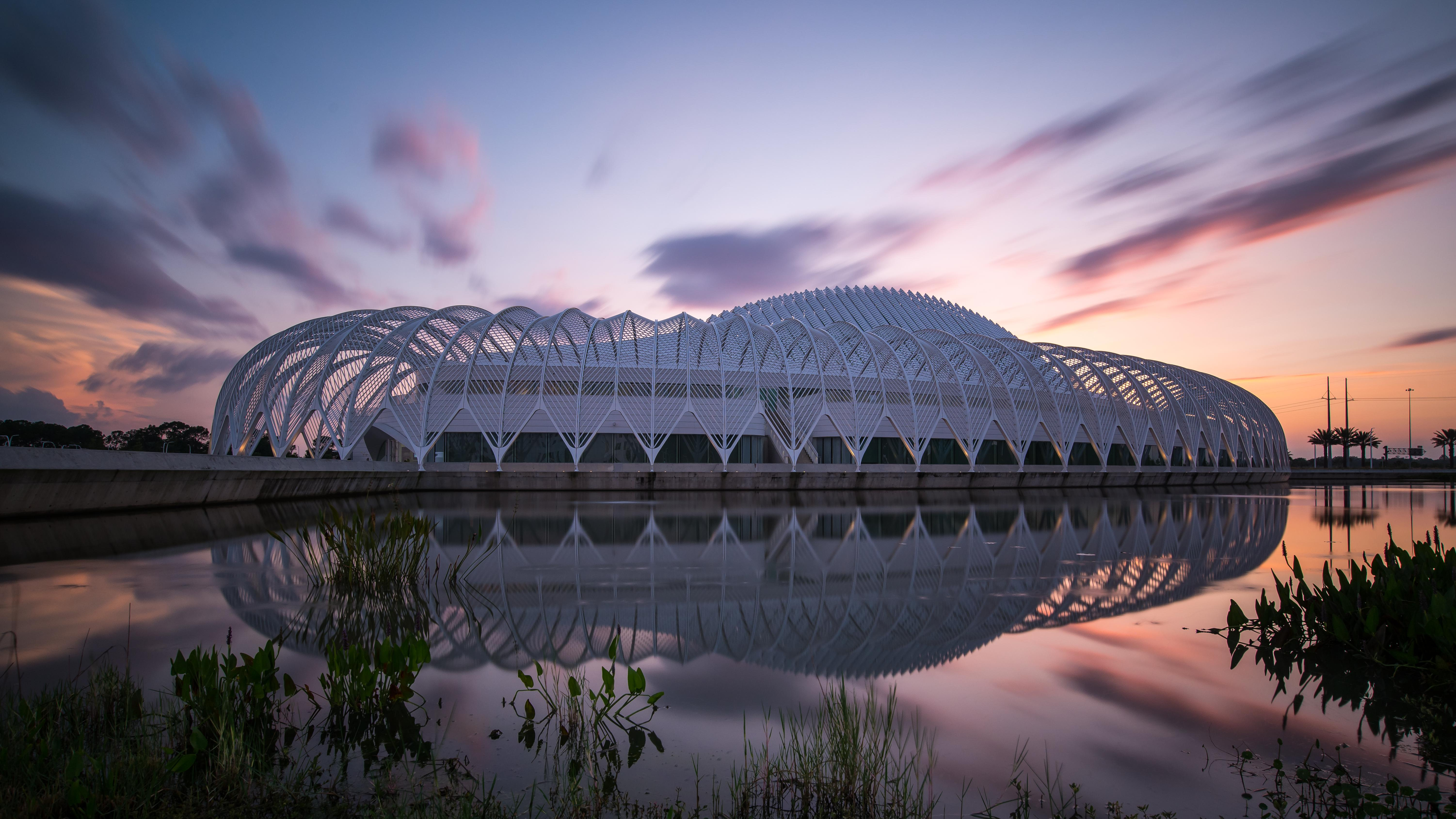
Eastern side of the IST Building

The University of South Florida opened a satellite campus in Lakeland – University of South Florida Lakeland – in 1988. The branch shared its grounds with the Lakeland campus of Polk Community College (now Polk State College). By the 2000s it had grown to enroll around 4,000 students, and the local business owners secured state funding for a separate campus in 2008. The same year, USF's trustees renamed the campus University of South Florida Polytechnic, reflecting a new focus on STEM education. A site near Interstate 4 was chosen for the new campus. In 2009 Spanish architect Santiago Calatrava was selected to design the campus' first building.

Meanwhile, the institution's backers, most prominently Florida state senator J. D. Alexander, then-chair of the Florida Senate's Budget Committee, initiated a campaign to break USF Polytechnic away from USF and form an independent university, Florida Polytechnic University. In 2011 Alexander proposed a 2012-13 state budget that provided $33 million for the move. Like the acquisition of the new campus, the proposed split was controversial in some quarters, as it came during a tight budget year and was unpopular with USF students and faculty. In response to Alexander's proposal, the Florida Board of Governors approved a multi-year plan to allow Florida Polytechnic to gain independence gradually once it met certain criteria, including accreditation, the construction of residence halls, and the development of a STEM curriculum. Displeased with the board's compromise, Alexander introduced a new budget for the state universities that included immediate independence from USF Polytechnic, effectively bypassing the Board of Governors.

On April 20, 2012, Governor Rick Scott signed into law Alexander's budget for the State University System, including the provision that created Florida Polytechnic University as an independent institution, and closed down USF Polytechnic. The law took effect on July 1, 2012. In a letter that accompanied the signed legislation (SB 1994) creating Florida Poly, Scott noted that Florida Poly, with its strong focus on STEM programs, will be a key component of the State University System of Florida meeting the goals outlined in its 2012-2015 Strategic Plan. The strategic plan requires the State University System to increase STEM degree production from 9,605 to 22,500 per year by 2025. Robert Gidel was elected chairman of the school's first 8-member board of trustees on August 1, 2012.

The university submitted its initial application for regional accreditation in December 2014. In March 2016, the Florida Poly administration announced that the university would not meet its original accreditation deadline of December 31, 2016. A budget bill sent to the office of Gov. Rick Scott would extend the school's accreditation deadline until December 2017. The university finally received accreditation from the Southern Association of Colleges and Schools Commission on Colleges in June 2017.

The university had its inaugural commencement ceremony on January 3, 2017. Fourteen students graduated with the Master of Science and four students were awarded the Bachelor of Science. The commencement speaker was JD Alexander, the former state senator known for his advocacy of a STEM university in Lakeland. The campus was thus named after him.

On April 15, 2024, Devin Stephenson was selected by a committee to serve as Florida Poly's next president after inaugural university president Randy Avent announced his resignation from the position at the end of the tenth year of his tenure.

== Academics ==
The university offers nine baccalaureate programs, two master's programs and 31 areas of concentration. Curricula and classroom facilities are designed to facilitate hands-on, applied learning, and degree programs are focused on preparing students for STEM-related careers. Four Florida Poly bachelor's degrees received ABET accreditation on August 28, 2019: computer engineering, computer science, electrical engineering, and mechanical engineering.

=== Demographics ===
Fall first-time freshman admission statistics
	2024	2023	2022	2021	2020	2019	2018	2017	2016
Applicants	3,624	2,432	2,780	2,124	1,665	1,259	1,438	1,215	1,531
Admits	1,435	1,281	1,310	1,159	973	631	729	672	1,127
Enrolls	477	343	358	398	315	277	315	317	410
Admit rate	39.6%	52.7%	47.1%	54.6%	58.4%	50.1%	50.7%	55.3%	73.6%
Yield rate	33.2%	26.8%	27.3%	34.3%	32.4%	43.9%	43.2%	47.2%	36.4%
SAT composite*	1170–1340 (71.50%†)	1150–1250 (69%†)	1250–1370 (69%†)	1210–1360 (90%†)	1210–1300 (91%†)	1210–1340 (85%†)	1220–1368 (67%†)	1180–1330 (52%†)	1040–1260 (72%†)
ACT composite*	21–26 (28.50%†)	25–31 (31%†)	26–30 (31%†)	26–31 (49%†)	27–32 (43%†)	27–31 (43%†)	27–31 (33%†)	25–29 (48%†)	23–28 (65%†)
* middle 50% range † percentage of first-time freshmen who chose to submit

Undergraduate demographics as of Fall 2023
Race and ethnicity	Total
White	56%
Hispanic	25%
Asian	6%
Black	6%
Two or more races	5%
International student	1%
Unknown	1%
Economic diversity
Low-income (Note: The percentage of students who received an income-based federal Pell grant intended for low-income students.)	33%
Affluent (Note: The percentage of students who are a part of the American middle class at the bare minimum.)	67%

The inaugural class of students at Florida Poly had an average incoming GPA of 3.9 and test scores of 1350 on the SAT and 25 on the ACT. The average weighted high school GPA was 4.0, with average SAT and ACT scores for admitted freshman in fall 2017 at 1280 (SAT) and 28 (ACT).

== Industry partnerships ==
Florida Poly collaborates with more than 100 corporate, government and non-government organizations that provide guidance on curriculum development, assist with research and offer internship opportunities. Industry partners include Microsoft, Lockheed Martin, Mosaic, Cisco and Harris Corporation. In Sept 2016, the University announced a long-term partnership with the Florida Department of Transportation (FDOT). The FDOT will build a 400-acre technology test facility, which will include a 2.25-mile test track.

== Research ==
The Florida Industrial and Phosphate Research (FIPR) Institute is a Florida Poly research institution. The FIPR institute supports phosphate-related studies to improve the environment, protect public health and increase mining and processing efficiency. FIPR Institute's staff biologists, engineers and chemists also conduct in-house research, and the institute supports some non-phosphate topics such as energy and the mining and processing of other minerals.

Florida Poly's Advanced Mobility Institute (AMI) is a university-affiliated technology research center focused on the development and testing of autonomous vehicle (AV) related technology. AMI is not only unique to the state, but also one of the largest university centers specialized on the narrow area of testing and verification of AV technology in the country.

== Campus ==
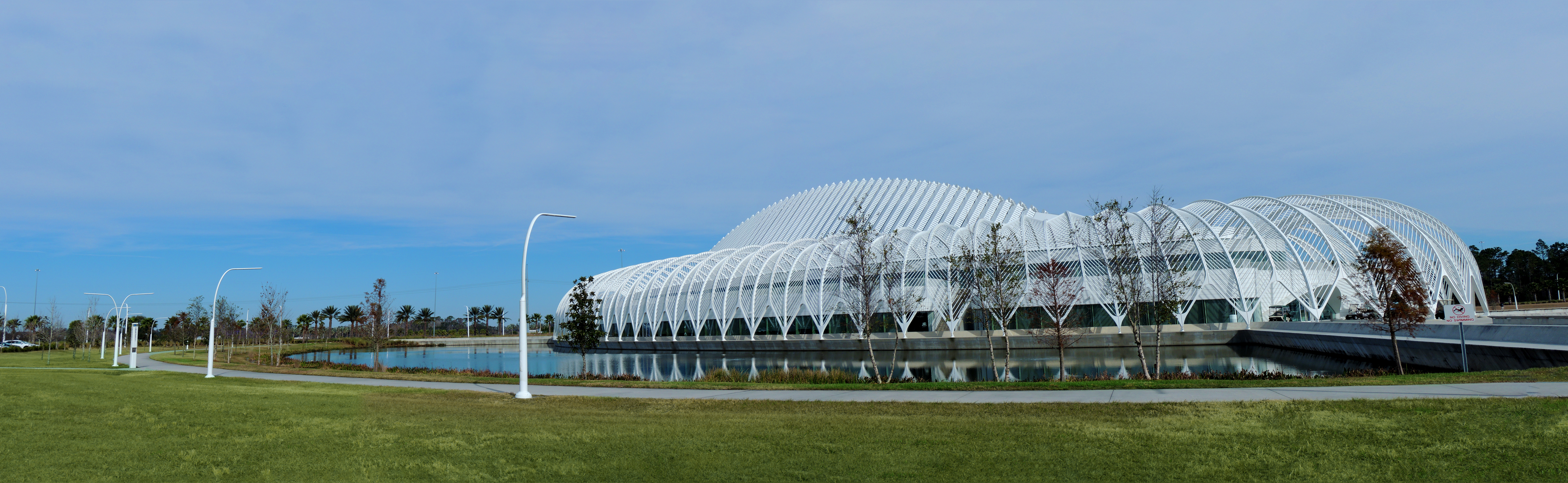
A view of the IST Building from the visitor parking lot

Florida Poly's 170-acre campus includes the Innovation, Science and Technology (IST) Building, two residence halls, Student Development Center, Wellness Center, and Admissions Center. The University Trail is a multiuse trail connected to the campus.

=== Innovation, Science, and Technology (IST) Building ===
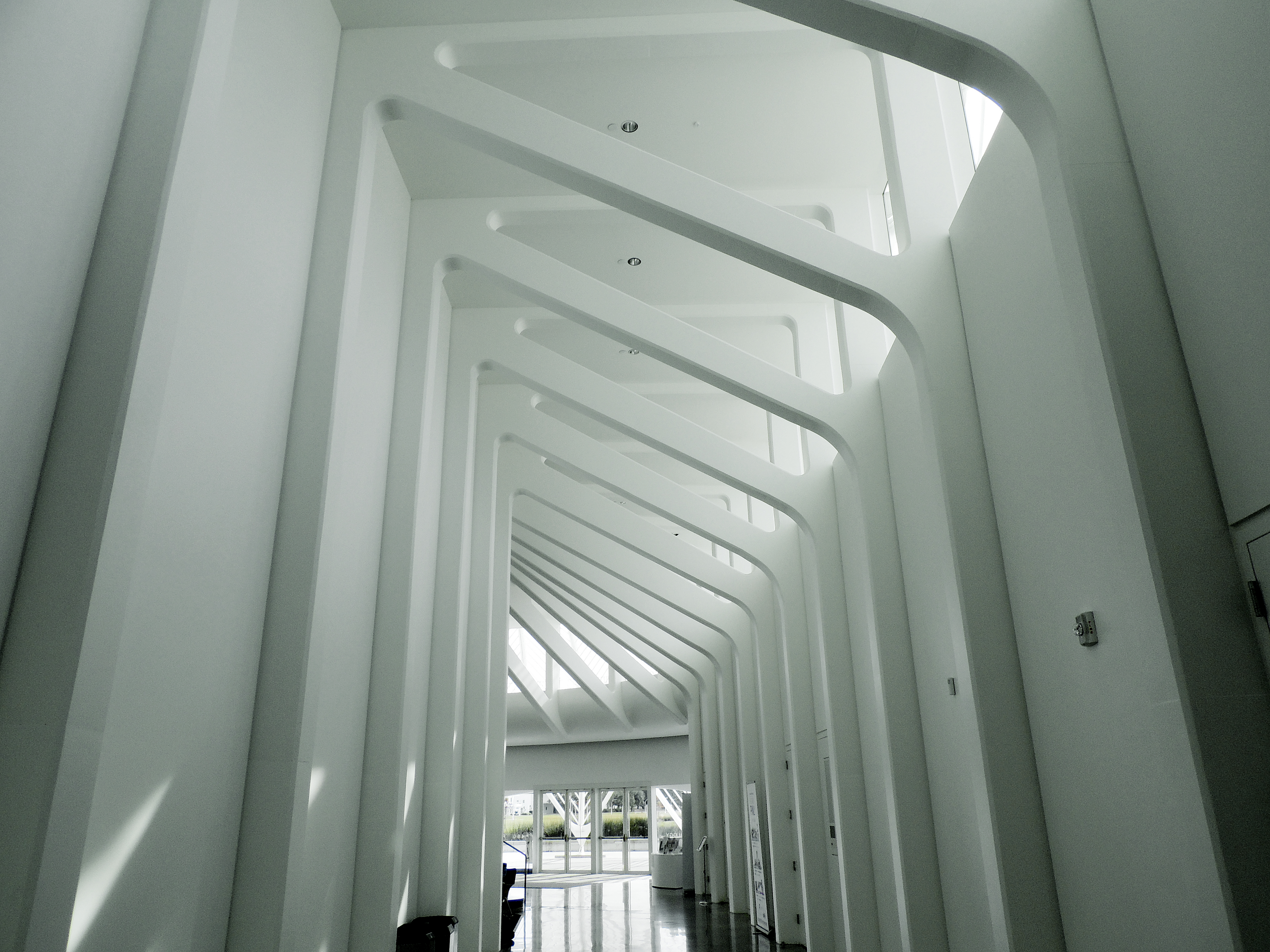
Inside the main facility

The 162,000-square-foot Innovation, Science, and Technology (IST) Building is the university's main facility. It houses 26 classrooms, faculty and administrative offices, 11,000-square-foot Saddle Creek Logistics Commons, seven labs–including a 3D printing lab, cybersecurity lab, and health informatics lab. The building is also home to the school's digital library. Designed by Spanish architect Santiago Calatrava, the building includes 94 robotic louvers on the roof that move to accommodate changing sunlight patterns.

==== Digital library ====
Florida Poly's IST Building includes a bookless library where students can access more than 135,000 digital titles on their choice of reader, tablet or laptop. Students still have access to librarians and a reference desk to receive tutoring, resources and training to manage digital materials. Hard copy books can be requested on loan from libraries at Florida's 11 other public universities.

=== Barnett Applied Research Center (formerly the Applied Research Center) ===
The Barnett Applied Research Center (BARC) opened in spring 2022. The new 85,000 square foot Barnett Applied Research Center (BARC) houses research and teaching laboratories, student design spaces, conference rooms, and faculty offices. The building also provides study areas for graduate students and a small amount of administrative space. A dedicated section of the center assists with commercialization of innovation and applied research and send new inventions into the marketplace. During the Fall 2023 semester, the name was changed from the "Applied Research Center" (ARC) to the "Barnett Applied Research Center" (BARC) after the Barnett Family, which has donated over $10 million to the university.

=== Residence halls ===
Florida Polytechnic University has three residence halls, starting with Residence Hall I, with Residence Hall II being built in 2015. Residence Hall I consists of three- and four-bedroom suites, while Residence Hall II is mostly two-bedroom "semi-suites". The buildings themselves were originally owned by an outside company, but as of November 2022 the school now owns both buildings. On March 29, 2023, Florida Polytechnic University announced the broken ground on Residence Hall III, a five story, 137,000 square foot facility with 430 beds in one, two and four bedroom suites, which was completed on September 10, 2024.

== Florida PolyCon ==
Since April 2015, Florida Polytechnic University has hosted an annual convention called FLPolyCon, which in 2021 rebranded to Florida PolyCon. According to the website for the 2018 FLPolyCon, "FLPolyCon is a diverse, all-inclusive geek culture celebration hosted by the students at Florida Polytechnic University." Historically, the convention has catered to the self-professed "geek" culture by including aspects of video games and comics, often of the science fiction genre. More recently, Florida PolyCon has been adding elements of anime and cosplay.
