= William Francis Whitman Jr. =

William Francis Whitman Jr. (1914–2007) was a horticulturist who prospected for unusual tropical fruits around the world and helped popularize many of them in the United States.

He was born in 1914 in Chicago to Leona and William Francis Whitman Sr. His father owned a printing company in Chicago and later developed real estate in Miami, Florida. He sailed to Tahiti, and was fascinated by the tropical fruits.

Whitman was one of the founders of The Rare Fruit Council International, then known as The Rare Fruit Council, A Tropical Study Group, based in Miami, and was its first president, from 1955 to 1960. He introduced the Kohala longan to Florida. He was also inducted into the East Coast Surfing Hall of Fame in 1998. William got his degree from the University of Florida in administration.

== Publications ==
- Five Decades with Tropical Fruit (2001)
