= Florida Board of Control =

- Type: Governing Board
- Established: 1905
- Location: Tallahassee, Florida, US

The Florida Board of Control (1905–1965) was the statewide governing body for the State University System of Florida, which included all public universities in the state of Florida. It was replaced by the Florida Board of Regents in 1965.

== History ==
The Florida Board of Control was created by the 1905 legislation known as the Buckman Act. The act reorganized Florida's public higher education system into three institutions, segregated by race and gender, as follows:

- State Normal College for Colored Students (now known as Florida Agricultural and Mechanical University) for African Americans
- Florida State College for Women (now known as Florida State University) for Caucasian women
- University of the State of Florida (now known as the University of Florida) for Caucasian men

The gender separation aspect of the Buckman Act was overturned by the Florida Legislature in 1947, when it was necessary to make room for the World War II veterans who wished to use the GI Bill of Rights to pursue their educational endeavors. Florida State College for Women became the much larger, coeducational Florida State University, and the University of Florida was made coeducational. While the racial segregation aspect of the Buckman Act was overturned by the Civil Rights Act of 1964, Florida State University and the University of Florida began accepting African-American undergraduates in 1961–1962. The State Normal College for Colored Students changed its name to Florida Agricultural and Mechanical College for Negroes in 1909, and in 1953 the name was again changed to Florida Agricultural and Mechanical University.

== Institutions founded ==
- University of South Florida (1956)
- Florida Atlantic University (1961)
- Florida Technological University (1963)
- University of West Florida (1963)

== See also ==
- Henry Holland Buckman

Preceded by NA	Governing Body for the State University System of Florida; 1905–1965	Succeeded by Florida Board of Regents
