= State University System of Florida =

Public university system in Florida

- Type: Public university system
- Established: 1905; 121 years ago
- Chancellor: Ray Rodrigues
- Students: 430,000 (2023)
- Location: Tallahassee, Florida, U.S.
- Campus: 12 member institutions
- Colors: Blue and gold
- Website: www.flbog.edu

The State University System of Florida (SUSF or SUS) is a system of twelve public universities in the U.S. state of Florida. As of 2018, over 341,000 students were enrolled in Florida's state universities. Together with the Florida College System, which includes Florida's 28 community colleges and state colleges, it is part of Florida's system of public higher education. The system, headquartered in Tallahassee, is overseen by a chancellor and governed by the Florida Board of Governors.

The Florida Board of Governors was created in 2003 to centralize the administration of the State University System of Florida. Previously, Florida's State University System had been governed by the Florida Board of Regents (1965–2001) and the Florida Board of Control (1905–1965).

== History and governance ==
The system was created in Article IX, Section 7 of the Florida Constitution to support education, research, and public service for the people of Florida and their communities. Prior to 1905, Florida's state institutions were governed by a Board of Education and even earlier variations thereof, reaching back to the Florida Constitution of 1838 wherein higher education and normal education was established, based on grants of land from the U.S. Congress. From 1905 to 1965, the few universities in the system were governed by the Florida Board of Control. The Board of Control was replaced by the Florida Board of Regents in 1965, to accommodate the growing university system.

The Board of Regents governed until it was disbanded by the Florida Legislature in 2001, and its authority was divided between the Florida Board of Education (which was given some authority over all levels of public education in the state), and appointed university boards of trustees, which operated independently for each separate institution. In 2002, Floridians led by U.S. senator Bob Graham passed an amendment to the Florida Constitution establishing a new statewide governing body, the Florida Board of Governors.

Chancellors

Term	Chancellor
1954–1968	J. Broward Culpepper
1968–1975	Robert B. Mautz
1975–1980	E.T. York
1981–1985	Barbara W. Newell
1985–1998	Charles B. Reed
1998–2001	Adam Herbert
2001	Judy Hample
2003–2005	Debra D. Austin
2005–2009	Mark B. Rosenberg
2009–2013	Frank Brogan
2014–2022	Marshall Criser III
2023–present	Ray Rodrigues

Chancellors of the State University System of Florida

SUS student enrollment

SUS Student Enrollment
Year	Students	%±
1905	620	—
1910	835	+35%
1915	1,341	+61%
1920	1,882	+40%
1925	3,688	+96%
1930	4,655	+26%
1935	5,550	+19%
1940	6,395	+15%
1945	7,020	+10%
1950	19,015	+171%
1955	19,847	+4%
1960	27,053	+36%
1965	43,849	+62%
1970	73,676	+68%
1975	115,334	+57%
1980	128,578	+11%
1985	146,692	+14%
1990	179,775	+23%
1995	208,493	+16%
2000	240,753	+15%
2005	287,375	+19%
2010	321,503	+12%
2015	345,672	+8%
2020	353,041	+2%
2021	354,186	+0%

== Universities within the system ==
State University System of Florida locations

State University System of Florida
Institution	Location	Established	Start of instruction	Enrollment (2021)	Athletics
Florida State University	Tallahassee	1851 (Note: In 1836, the United States Congress authorized the establishment of a University of Florida in the Florida Territory to be located on lands reserved in both East and West Florida. In 1851, the Florida legislature voted to establish two seminaries of learning: West Florida Seminary (which later became Florida State University) and East Florida Seminary (which later became the University of Florida). In 1905, when the Buckman Act reorganized higher education in Florida, the three resulting state institutions (Florida, Florida State, and Florida A&M) all adopted 1905 as their founding date. In 1935, the Florida Board of Control changed the founding dates of Florida and Florida State to the years their predecessor Seminaries opened: 1853 and 1857, respectively. In 2000, Florida State reverted to the charter date of 1851 as its founding date, which was used before 1905, reflecting the date the legislature authorized both seminaries. Florida A&M later declared its founding date to be 1887 to reflect when its predecessor, the State Normal College for Colored Students, was founded.)	1857	45,130	ACC (NCAA Division I)
University of Florida	Gainesville	1853	1853	61,112	SEC (NCAA Division I)
Florida A&M University	Tallahassee	1887	1887	9,000	SWAC (NCAA Division I)
University of South Florida	Tampa	1956	1960	44,322	The American (NCAA Division I)
Florida Atlantic University	Boca Raton	1961	1964 (Note: FAU and North Florida did not admit freshmen or sophomores until 1984.)	30,155	The American (NCAA Division I)
University of West Florida	Pensacola	1963	1967 (Note: West Florida did not admit freshmen or sophomores until 1983.)	13,317	Gulf South (NCAA Division II) (ASUN, NCAA Division I in 2026)
University of Central Florida	Orlando (Note: The main UCF campus has an Orlando mailing address, but is in unincorporated Orange County.)	1963	1968	70,406	Big XII (NCAA Division I)
Florida International University	Miami (Note: The main FIU campus has a Miami mailing address, but is in unincorporated Miami-Dade County.)	1965	1972 (Note: FIU did not admit freshmen or sophomores until 1981.)	56,732	The American (NCAA Division I)
New College of Florida	Sarasota	1960 (private, joined SUSF in 1975 via USF, independent 2001)	1964	659	The Sun (NAIA)
University of North Florida	Jacksonville	1965	1972	16,594	ASUN (NCAA Division I)
Florida Gulf Coast University	Fort Myers (Note: The main FGCU campus has a Fort Myers mailing address, but is in unincorporated Lee County.)	1991	1997	15,370	ASUN (NCAA Division I)
Florida Polytechnic University	Lakeland	2012	2014	1,563	The Sun (NAIA; possibly 2027–28)

== Gallery ==
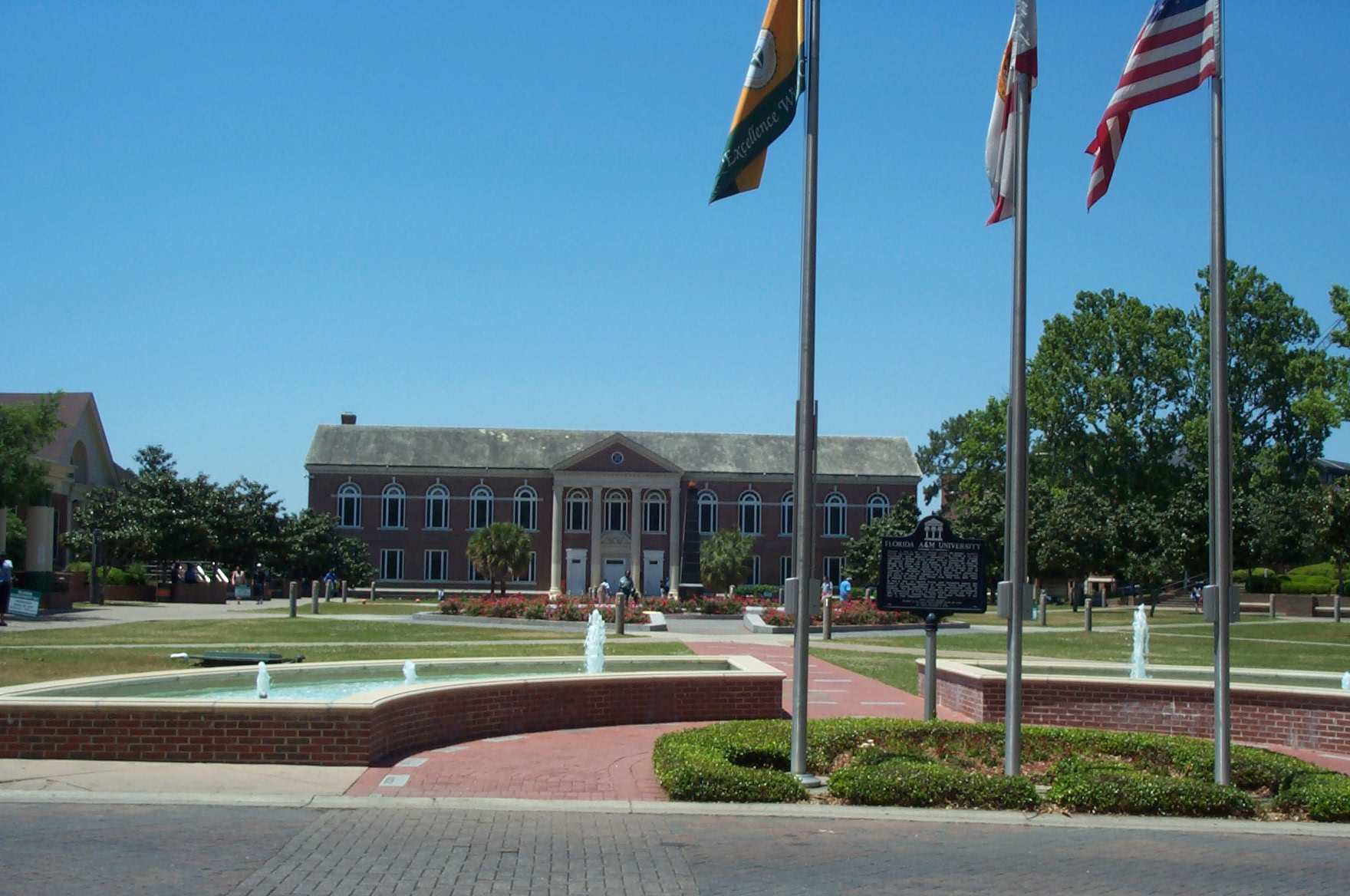
Florida A&M University

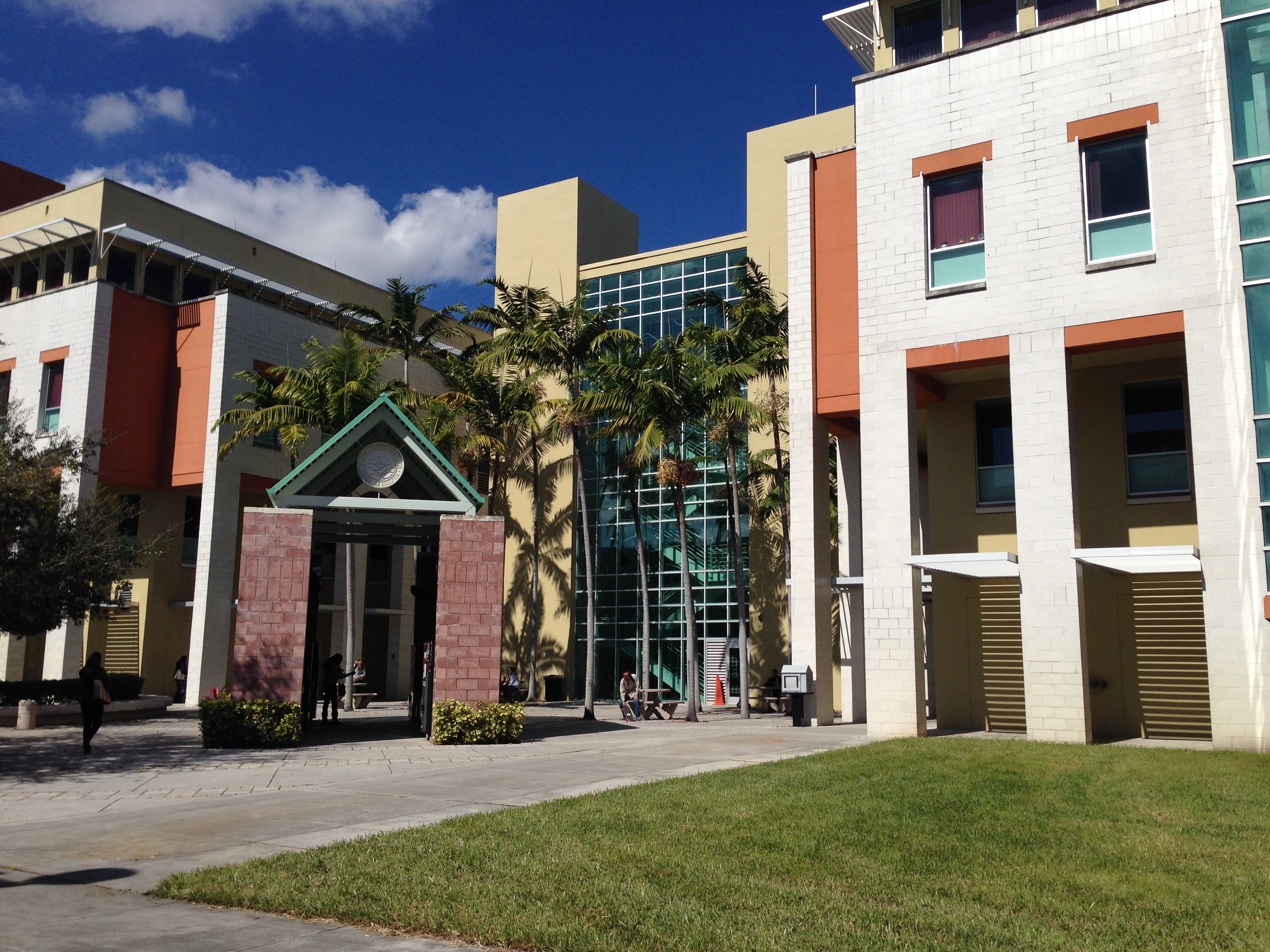
Florida Atlantic University

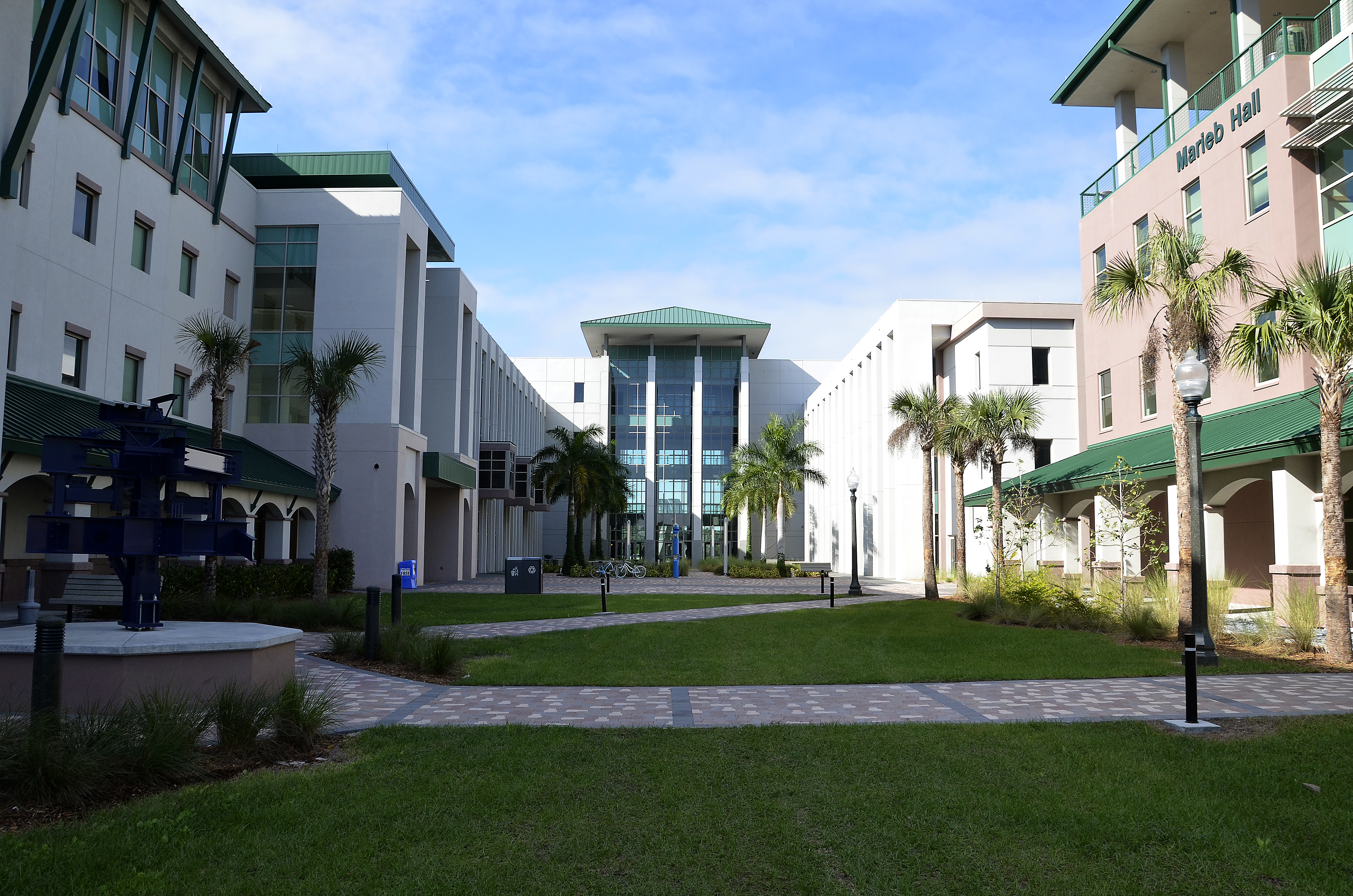
Florida Gulf Coast University

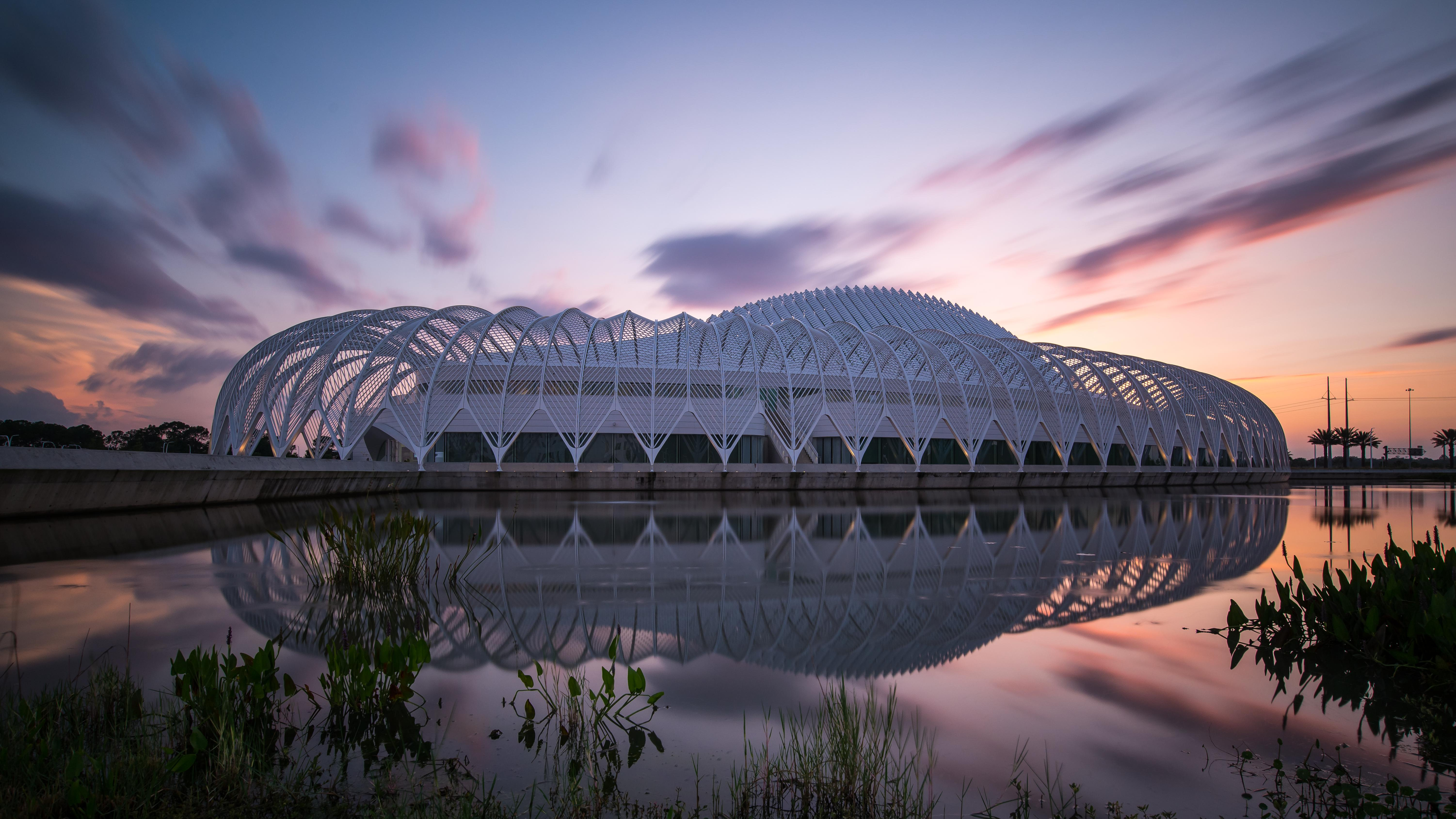
Florida Polytechnic University

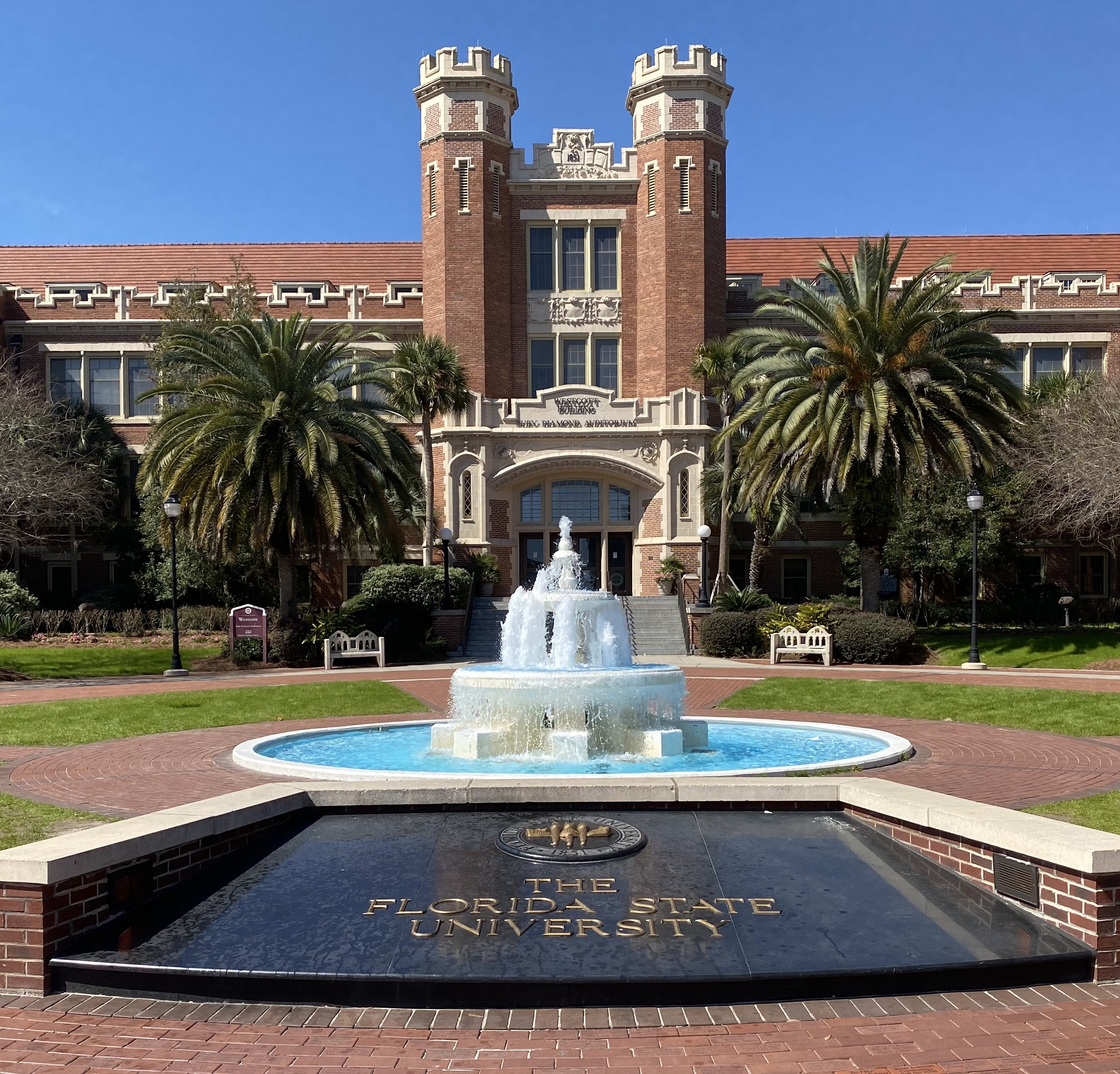
Florida State University

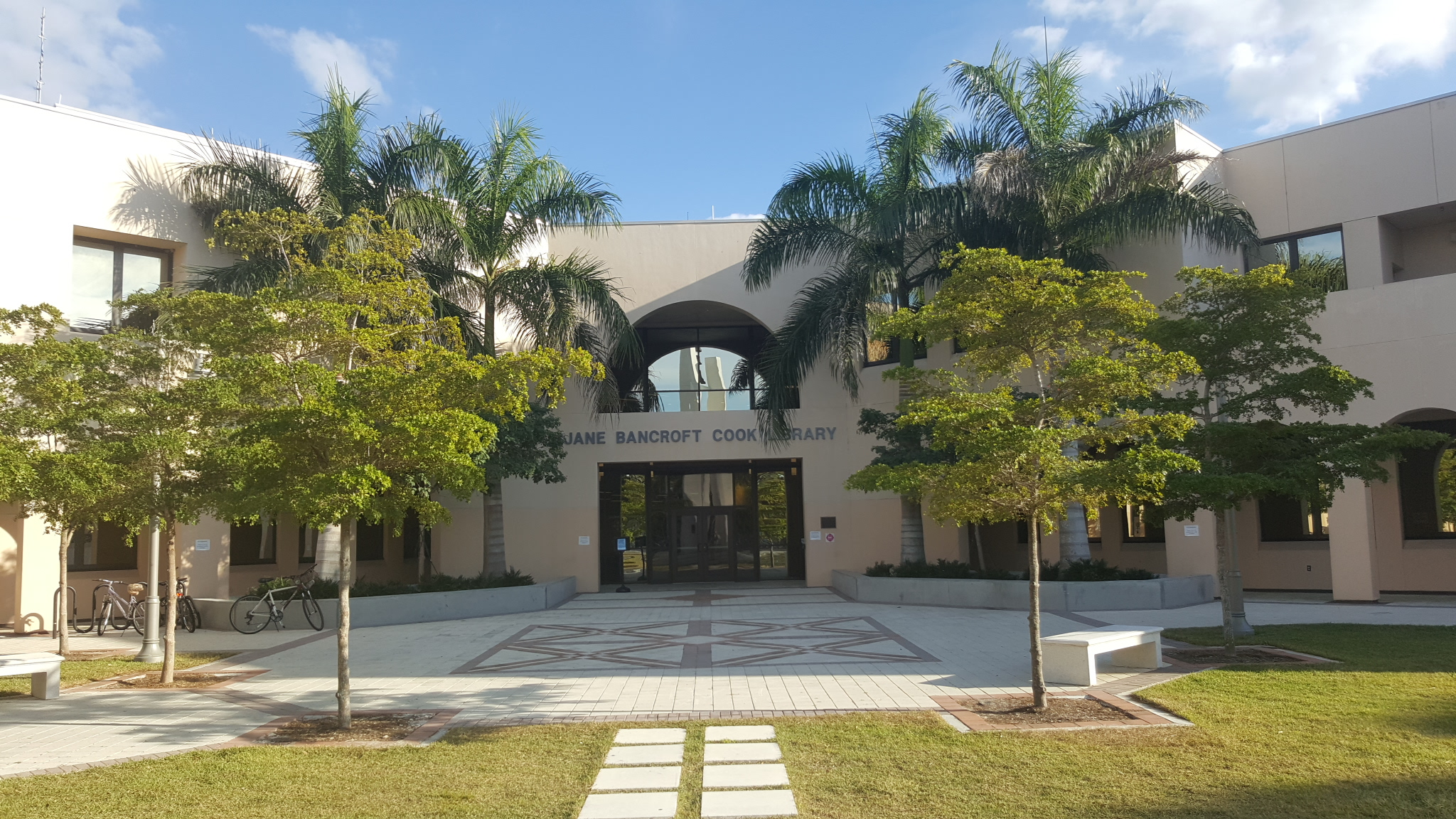
New College of Florida

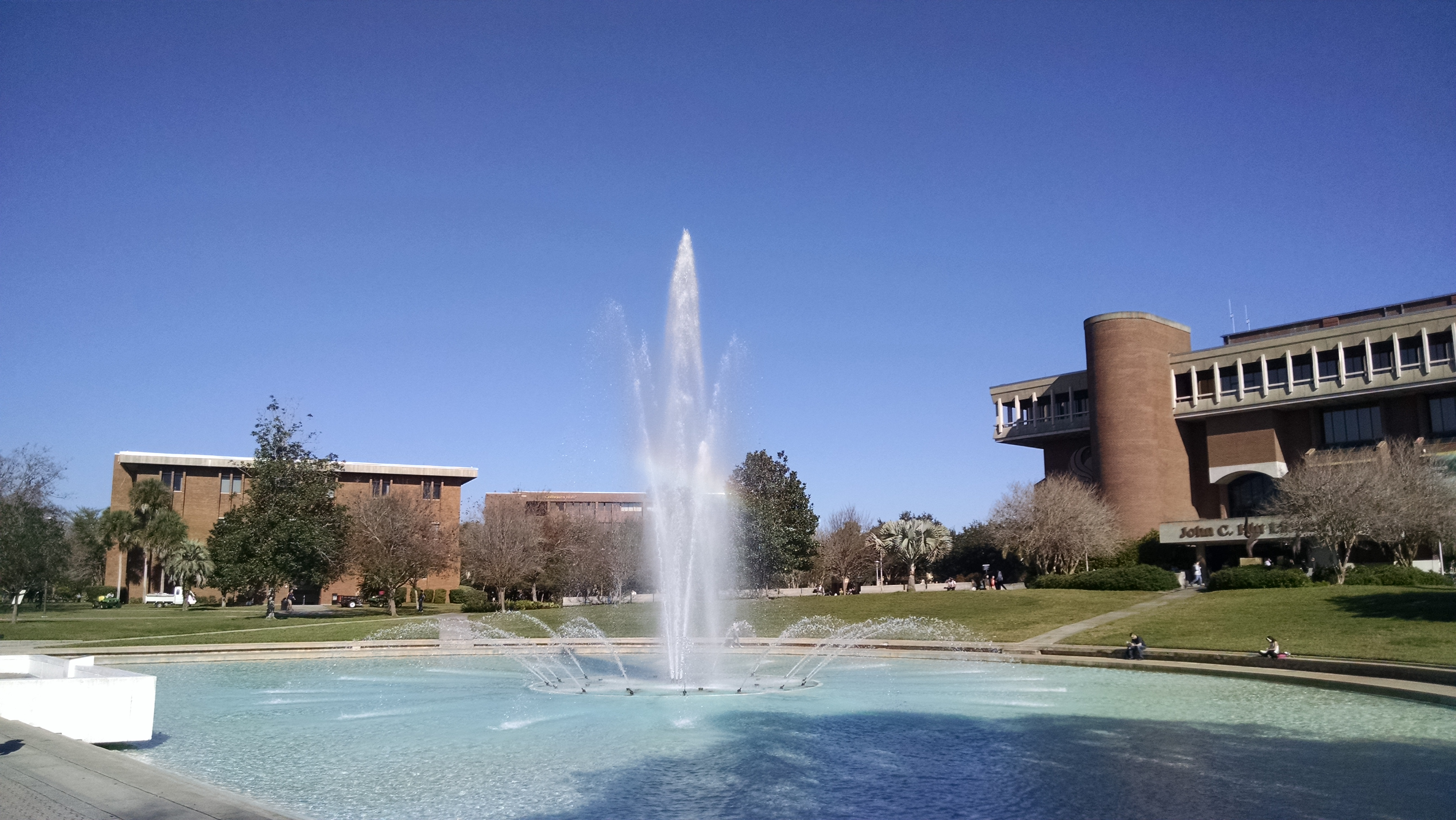
University of Central Florida

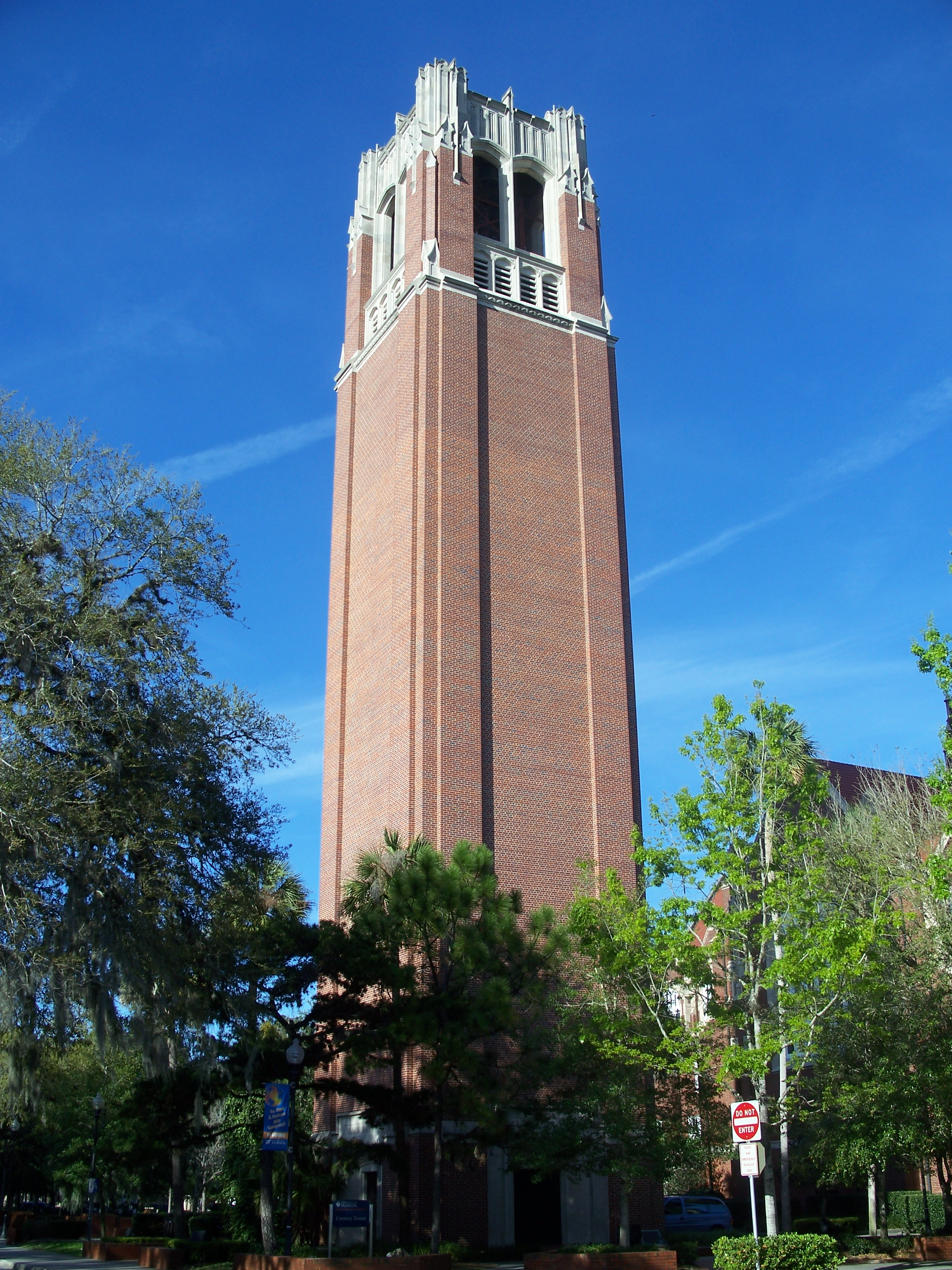
University of Florida

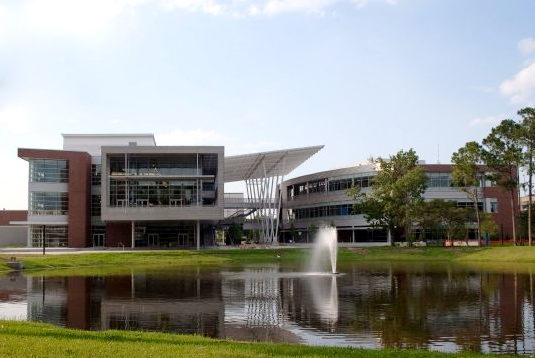
University of North Florida

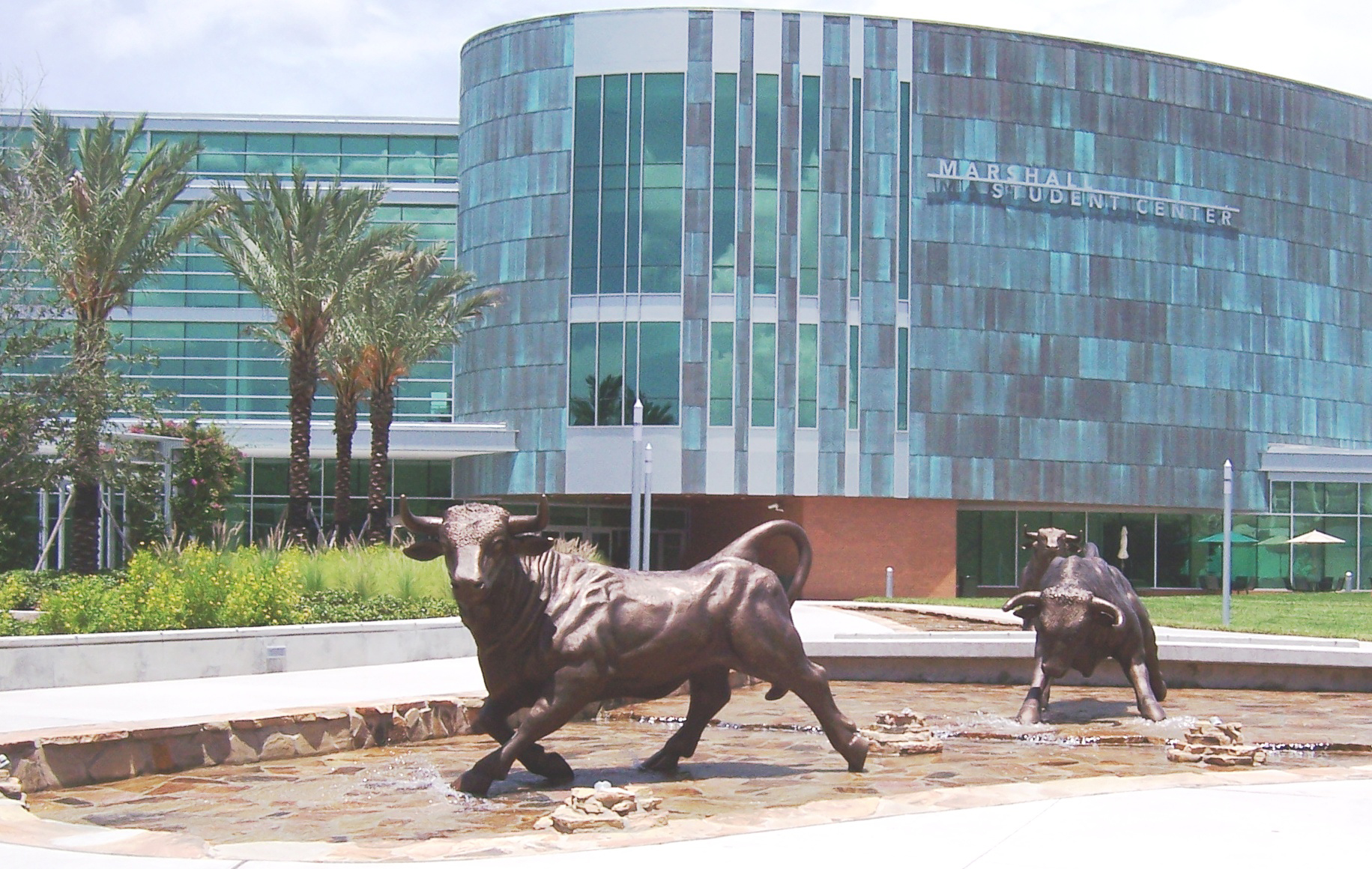
University of South Florida

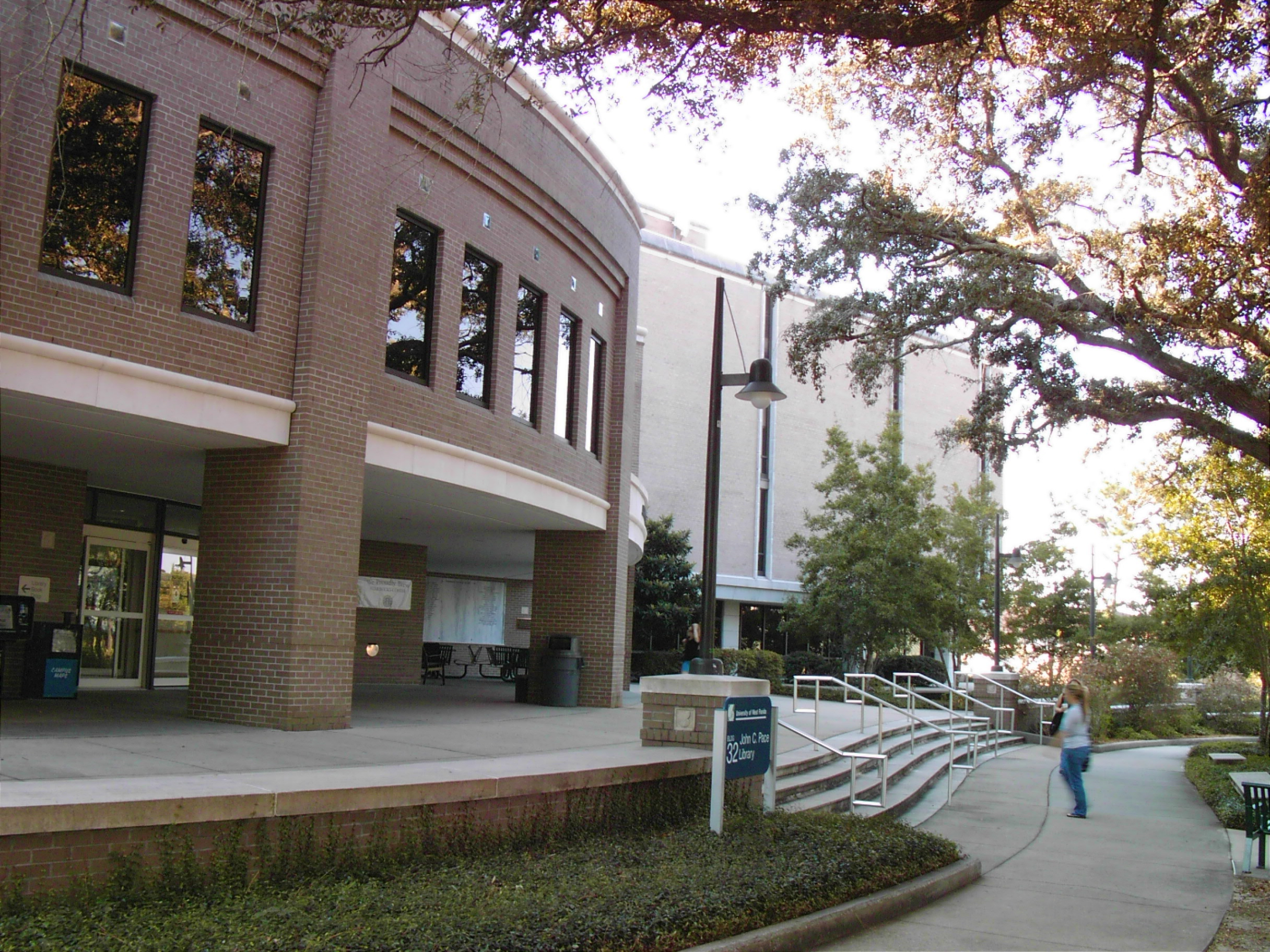
University of West Florida

== See also ==
- Florida College System
- Florida Student Association
- Florida Department of Education
- Advisory Council of Faculty Senates
- List of colleges and universities in Florida
