= Landmarks and monuments of Florida State University =

The landmarks and monuments of Florida State University are statues, sculptures, memorials and greenspaces located on Florida State University's Tallahassee campus that are considered culturally or historically significant. The landmarks usually depict a person in the history of the university or represent an ideal that the university holds. These landmarks can also represent a key part of traditions held by the student body.

Name	Photo	Year	Closest building
Alpha Delta Pi Meditation Pavilion #23		2009	Greek Park
Eric J. Barron statue		2020	Earth, Ocean and Atmospheric Science Building
Benches as Monuments		1940-now	Everywhere
Elizabeth Blackwell marker		2006	Nobel Laureate Walk
Konrad Emil Bloch marker		2006	Nobel Laureate Walk
Bobby Bowden Statue		2004	Moore Athletic Center
Bobby Bowden Window		2004	Moore Athletic Center
James M. Buchanan marker		2006	Nobel Laureate Walk
Doak S. Campbell statue		1933	Doak Campbell Stadium
Chi Omega Three Sisters statue #23		2008	Greek Park
Edward Conradi statue		2009	Law School
Sandy D'Alemberte statue		2017	Law School
Sandy D'Alemberte window		2017	Dodd Hall
Paul Dirac marker		2006	Nobel Laureate Walk
East Gate		1916	Westcott Building
George Matthews Edgar statue		2009	Westcott Building
Francis W. Eppes statue		2001	removed from campus
Fallen Officer Memorial		2018	Criminology & Criminal Justice Building
Friendship Garden Fountain #9		2012	Mina Jo Powell Alumni Green
John Gorrie marker		2006	Medical School
Greek Park		2008	Greek Park
Heritage Museum windows		2011-2023	Dodd Hall
Heritage Tower: the Torch		1998	University Center-A
Hippocrates marker		2006	Medical School
Integration 50 Year Pyramid #6		2012	Student Union
Integration Statue		2004	Student Union
Kissing Bench		1950s	Dorman Hall
Harold Kroto marker		2006	Nobel Laureate Walk
Labyrinth		2017	Psychology Building
Landis Green		1939	Landis Hall
Langford Green		2000	Doak Campbell Stadium
Robert O. Lawton Distinguished Professors Obelisk		2008	Strozier Library
Legacy Fountain		2005	Landis Hall
Dale W. Lick statue		2019	Stone Education Building
J. Stanley Marshall statue		2014	HCB Classroom Building
Memorial Garden #9		2000	moved and rededicated as Friendship Garden
Robert Sanderson Mulliken marker		2006	Nobel Laureate Walk
Albert A. Murphree statue		2007	Murphree Hall
Claude Pepper Center		1998	Claude Pepper Center
Mina Jo Powell Alumni Green		1990	Mina Jo Powell Alumni Green
Sandels Obelisk		2009	Sandels Green
John Robert Schrieffer marker		2006	Nobel Laureate Walk
Historic School Seals Monument		2000	Westcott Building
Seminole Family sculpture		2006	University Center-A
Student Government Memorial pond & monument		2007	Mina Jo Powell Alumni Green
Bernard F. Sliger statue		2007	Doak Campbell Stadium
Sod Cemetery		1962	Doak Campbell Stadium
South Gate		1933	Dodd Hall
Scott Speicher Memorial		2018	Speicher Tennis Center
Sportsmanship sculpture		2000	Doak Campbell Stadium
Robert M. Strozier statue		2016	Strozier Library
Sundial at Bryan Hall #28		1917	Bryan Hall
John Thrasher statue		2022	Westcott Building
Unconquered Statue		2003	University Center-B
Union Green		1952	Student Union
Werkmeister Window		1997	Dodd Hall
James D. Westcott Fountain		1917	Westcott Building
T. K. Wetherell statue		2010	Westcott Building

== Langford Green ==
Situated in front of the Doak Campbell Stadium, the Langford Green serves as a venue for performances and speeches, including concerts and similar events that are not organized by the university. The prime location of the venue allows for a fair number of spectators.

== Landis Green ==
Rests in the center of the campus as a student hub and area for recreation. Located in the center of the Florida State campus, Landis Green rests in front of the Landis Hall dormitory. Both hold their names after Cary D. Landis, who served as the Attorney General for Florida from 1931 to 1938. The Green serves as both an aesthetic place on the campus and as a location for student recreational activities throughout the year. Within the Green is the Legacy Fountain that saw construction in 2005, much later than the establishment of the green in 1931, though the green did not see its formal name until 1936. The university's Strozier Library rests opposite from the dormitory on the other end of the green, allowing the green to act as a further hub for students and faculty.

== Union Green ==
Frequent area of university events and demonstrations outside the student center. This area outside the Student Union of the campus is the smallest of the plots on campus, but due to its location sees a proportionally great amount of foot traffic with the university using the area for many special events. Due to the limited space available to the green, it has seen different use from the other open spaces on campus in that instead of recreational activities, more formal events take place. Student demonstrations, university fairs, and promotional events are all prominent examples of what the union green sees regularly.

== See also ==
- Florida State University
- History of Florida State University
- FSU Legacy Walk
- Florida State Seminoles
