= FSU Legacy Walk =

Historic tour of the Florida State University campus

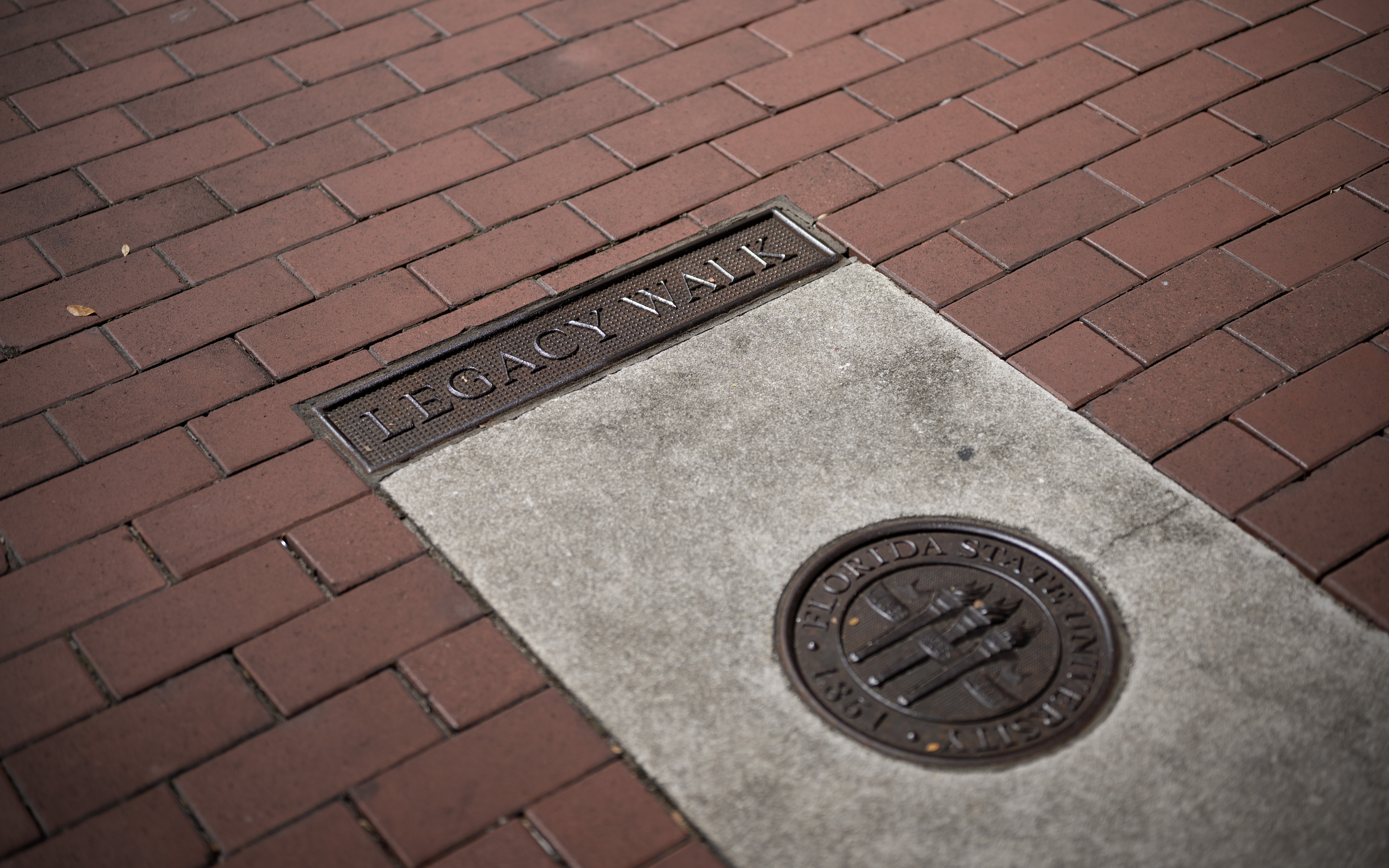
Ground marker denoting the Legacy Walk

The FSU Legacy Walk is a historical tour of the Florida State University campus, winding through the entire campus with stops showcasing architecture, green spaces, history and artwork. Legacy Walk medallions and garnet banners are placed to guide visitors along the mostly concrete paths. Raised brick podia display information and maps describing events and people are positioned at intervals on the walk. Bronze statues and monuments reflect the pride and history of the school's alumni and students.

== History ==
Florida State University's Legacy Walk was a campus improvement project that began in 1989 by FSU President Bernard F. Sliger in preparation for FSU's sesquicentennial. The intent was to reflect on the school's history and major successes of the first 150 years. The first annual celebration named Heritage Day was held in 2001.

=== Phase I ===
FSU unveiled phase I in October 2004, focusing on architecture, green spaces and sculpture. The Eppes section was named for the university's founder, Francis Eppes. It includes the eastern side of campus, beginning at the Eppes statue near the Westcott Building entrance. Surrounding the path are symbols and banners that guide visitors past the most historic buildings. At regular intervals, brick podia are located along the walk that contain maps and other important information about FSU events and people. The walk ends at Dodd Hall.

=== Phase II ===
Student Legacy Walk is the second phase and begins at the Legacy Fountain Sculptures on Landis Green. It passes through the center of student activity, highlights past student leaders and exists as a legacy to present students and those in the future. Banners depict campus life and guides visitors from the north Landis Green to the Department of History in the Bellamy Building, around to the newly constructed Student Union and passes the Integration Statue before circling the Student Services Building and returning to Landis.

=== Phase III ===
Science Legacy Walk is the third phase and includes the area of campus dedicated to advances in science and research. Beginning at the Integration Statue on Call Street it passes the Paul Dirac Science Library and the College of Nursing in Duxbury Hall, past the renovated Stone building, home to the College of Education, then the College of Medicine, established in 2006. This area of campus represents more than $800 million in new construction and renovations. State-of-the-art psychology, medicine, biological science and chemistry buildings have created the campus research quadrangle in the campus's northwest corner. The Nobel Laureates Walkway is there containing seven memorials, and status of Dale W. Lick and Sandy D'Alemberte, the eleventh and twelfth presidents of FSU, respectively.

=== Heritage Days ===
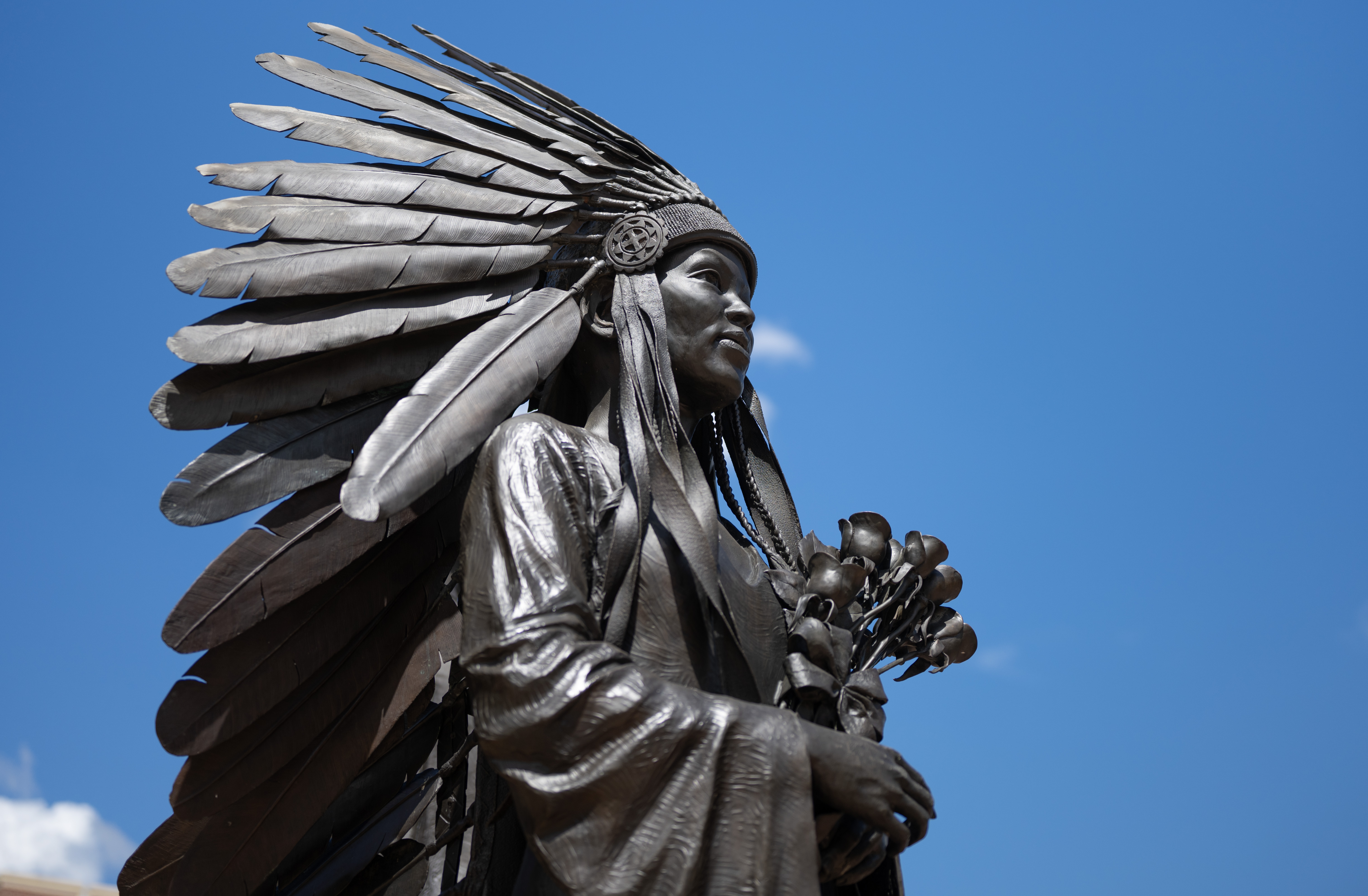
Integration sculpture

- Fifty years of Racial integration was the theme of the fourth annual Heritage Day January 30, 2004. The Integration sculpture was dedicated to "all those young men and women who helped make FSU rich in diversity". The three figures represent the first black FSU graduate, the first black to wear an FSU athletic uniform, and the first black homecoming princess.
- At the sixth annual Heritage Day, the Suwannee Room in the 1914 William Johnson Building was dedicated following a major restoration. When it first opened, the soaring ceilings were similar to Christ Church, Oxford. It was commonly known as the "Dining Hall" for five decades until closing in the late 1960s. A new marble obelisk on Landis Green was unveiled to honor recipients of the Robert O. Lawton Distinguished Professors award.
- The tenure of tenth FSU President Bernard F. Sliger was celebrated and his statue was unveiled at the 7th annual Heritage Day in 2007.
- Legacy Walk phase II was dedicated on the eighth annual Heritage Day January 19, 2008 with the newly completed statue of ninth FSU President J. Stanley Marshall.
- The ninth annual Heritage Day began with the dedication the Edward Conradi statue, the fourth president from 1909 to 1941. It was announced that the Werkmeister Humanities Reading Room will become the home for the new FSU Heritage Museum. The green space along Jefferson street was dedicated as the Greek Park, where sororities and fraternities could leave leadership legacies. The Chi Omega sorority celebrated their centennial with the 'Three Sisters' bronze statue. The university also celebrated the completion of a 15-year project that renovated the seven historic residence halls.
- Passing the Torch was the theme of the tenth annual Heritage Day. Departing President T. K. Wetherell said his final goodbyes and incoming President Eric Barron thanked everyone who helped make FSU a great Institution.
- For the eleventh annual Heritage Day, sixteen stained glas windows were unveiled and dedicated on April 8, 2011, in the Werkmeister Humanities Reading Room at Dodd Hall. The windows were created by students enrolled in the Master Craftsman Program at FSU over a dozen years with money from private gifts and donations of individuals, classes and other groups. Six different groups of students worked on the windows, guided by Bob and Jo Ann Bischoff.
- In 2012, the twelfth Annual Heritage Day was held on April 20 and included a rededication of Mina Jo Powell Alumni Green. The class of 2012 created a memorial garden on the green, and tours of the new Heritage Museum was given.

=== FSU Heritage Museum ===
During the life of Dodd Hall, the Werkmeister Humanities Reading Room was a studio for WFSU-TV and a library honoring Florida Senator Claude and Mildred Pepper. In late 2009, renovation began for it to serve as a museum. It is intended to evolve over time and not be a static collection. The museum displays photographs, ephemera, and artifacts that document the history of the university. The stained glass windows from 2011 were a preview of the museum's future.

=== Statue controversy ===
The Eppes Statue was unveiled in 2002 by FSU President Sandy D'Alemberte and became the starting point for FSU's Legacy Walk. In 2016 the group Students for a Democratic Society petitioned the Student Government Association to rename Eppes Hall and remove the statue of Francis W. Eppes, who was a slave owner. A referendum was held and students voted 70% to keep the statue. However, the statue was removed from the Legacy Walk in July 2018, though it was soon relocated to Mina Jo Powell Alumni Green in May 2019.

In July 2020, FSU President John Thrasher ordered the Eppes statue permanently removed from campus display and announced the formation of a President's Task Force on Anti-Racism, Equality, and Inclusion.

== Waypoints ==
#	Image	Point of Interest	Notes
1		Westcott Memorial Building	The Westcott was originally constructed as the administration building for the Florida State College of Women. It was built in 1910 and renamed in 1936 to honor James D. Westcott, the Florida Judge who left his entire $100,000 estate to the college in 1887. The building is the centerpiece of architecture on the campus and is the oldest location of continuous higher education in Florida.
1a		Rudy Diamond auditorium	Ruby Diamond Concert Hall in the Westcott Building was named for Ms. Ruby Pearl Diamond, a 1905 FSCW alumna and benefactor. Following a $38-million renovation over two years, it re-opened in 2010 as a 1260-seat performance space complete with new dressing rooms, space for production and rehearsals, and modern acoustics. The Knight Foundation Lobby also part of the renovation.
2		Historic School Seals Monument	The Historic School Seals Monument was donated by the Senior Class and Class Council of 2000. Master Craftsman Studio atrisans created the three black granite disks engraved with the image of the seals from West Florida Seminary, Florida State College and Florida State College for Women. Flagpoles are positioned behind each seal fly the flags of the US, Florida and FSU. There is a smaller black granite disk with the current seal of FSU.
3		Statue of President Wetherell	Honoring T. K. Wetherell, FSU's 13th President from 2003 until 2009. He was a triple alumnus and the first alumnus to serve as president. He was directly responsible for the Med School and construction/renovation of more than a dozen buildings on campus.
4		Westcott Fountain and Plaza	The fountain is a recognizable landmark on campus, a gift from the classes of 1915 and 1917 at Florida State College for Women. The fountain is situated in the center of Westcott Plaza, paved with bricks placed to commemorate teachers, students and others who have contributed to FSU.
5		University East Gate	The East Gate is the main entrance to campus, a gift from the classes of 1916 and 1918 at Florida State College for Women. The south pier from 1916 has an image of the lamp of knowledge. The north pier from 1918 has an image of the class flower, Cherokee rose. The steel arch between the piers was inscribed with, Florida State College for Women.
6		Pylon Celebrating 50 Years of Integration	On April 19, 2012, 1800 people including students, alumni, faculty, staff, special guests and community leaders joined hands in three lines stretching east, west & south in a Hand in Hand Across Time ceremony celebrating 50 years of campus integration. The lines radiated from the Integration Statue on Woodward Plaza to three commemorative pylons around the campus. FSU
7		Statue of President Edgar	The first president of the Seminary West of the Suwannee River was George Matthews Edgar. SWSR was the early predecessor of FSU and Edgar was president from 1887–1892.
8		Mina Jo Powell Alumni Green	Named in honor of Mina Jo Powell, who was a lifelong contributor to FSU and passionate advocate of natural, open spaces on campus. She graduated in 1950, the first class that included men and the last year that commencement ceremonies were held here. President Bernie Sliger dedicated the green in 1990. The green contains two bronze plaques whose inscriptions have been erased by weather. Two small buildings housing the State Normal College for Colored Students, predecessor of Florida A&M University, may have been located there from 1887 to 1891.
9		Memorial Garden	There is a small, shaded garden at the front of the amphitheater in the College of Music. A quiet fountain trickles water to honor all students who have died while attending FSU. The memorial was established in 2000 by the efforts of Susan James of the Student Government Association.
10		Longmire Building	The 1938 Longmire Building contains Gothic design elements including paneled walls, hand-painted plaster ceilings and medieval art. It was named to honor Rowena Longmire, an English professor who was founder and president of the Florida State College for Women (FSCW) Alumnae Association. Longmire was also the first building named for a member of the faculty. The building has been the center of activity that included the Student Government Association, a student lounge, the YWCA, lockers for day students, a soda shop, and guest accommodations for alumnae and distinguished visitors. Events are still held in the Alumni and Beth (Walton) Moor Lounges, but the building currently houses the administration of the College of Arts and Sciences, the oldest college at the FSU.
11		Sandels Building	The Sandels Building has a contemporary façade because it was built in the early 1950s during the final transition of FSU into a modern, co-educational institution. It was renovated in 1994 and is now home to the College of Health and Human Sciences, one of the largest in the nation. Named for Margaret Rector Sandels, Dean of the School of Home Economics 1922–1959.
11a		Sandels Obelisk	A large black obelisk sits in the middle of Sandels green. It celebrates the service and contributions of the Deans of the College of Health and Human Sciences, beginning with Margaret Sandels.
12		Statue of President Murphree	The bronze statue facing Murphree Hall honors Albert A. Murphree, the third president of the campus known as the Florida Female College. He was a motivator and mathematician but stated his intention of creating an “institution of higher learning whose students happened to be females,” not a traditional college for women. He was the only person to serve as president of both the University of Florida and Florida State University.
13		Jennie Murphree Hall	Behind President Murphree's statue is a dormitory built in 1922 and initially named Murphree Hall in honor of the FSU President. However, it was renamed for his wife Jennie Henderson Murphree who was born and raised in Tallahassee and graduated from Seminary West of the Suwannee River. A major renovation was completed in 1992.
14		Cawthon Hall	Cawthon Hall is a dormitory built in 1946 to accommodate growing enrollment. It was the last structure built in Collegiate Gothic style. It was named for the first Dean of "College Home" (now known as Student Affairs) at the FSCW, Sarah Lundrum Cawthon. The dormitory is now a living-learning center, home to music majors.
15		Lawton Obelisk	The Robert O. Lawton Distinguished Professor Award is the highest honor bestowed upon an FSU faculty member. The award is named for Robert O. Lawton, Dean of College of Arts and Sciences from 1966 to 1972, who died in an automobile accident. The obelisk bears the names of the award recipients.
16		Strozier Library	FSU's main library is situated on the north side of Landis Green; Landis Hall borders on the south. It was named in honor of Robert Manning Strozier, FSU president from 1957 to 1960. The three-story building, in addition to a five-story annex, provides digital and paper resources, books, Wi-Fi and comfortable meeting and study space for thousands of graduate and undergraduate students. While historic on the outside, the interior is modern and high-tech. It has the nation's first inside/outside Starbucks.
17		Bronze statue of President Strozier	Dr. Robert Manning Strozier became the sixth president of Florida State University in 1957. He had served as dean of students and professor of romance languages at the University of Chicago, and as a faculty member and administrator for 28 years at three institutions in Georgia. Dr. Strozier died unexpectedly at age 58 in 1960.
18		Montgomery Hall	One of the most historic buildings and a student recreational center is Montgomery Hall. Dr. Katherine Montgomery headed the physical education program for over 30 years and led an effort that resulted in the construction of the building in 1929. The gymnasium also hosted student dances, intramurals and a bowling alley. The heated indoor pool was home to the synchronized swimming Tarpon Club. At one time, the men's swimming and diving teams trained there. Montgomery Hall had a $17 million renovation in 2004, becoming a state-of-the-art dance facility. There is now a theater where the pool was once located and the wooden floors of the old basketball court are used for dancing. It is now home to the Maggie Allesee National Center for Choreography.
19		Legacy Fountain at Landis Green	Landis Green is an open space where students roam, recreate and relax. At the center sits the Legacy Fountain, a water feature that includes six life-sized figures cast in bronze. One side shows three female figures with attire from 1915 to 1947 that represents Florida State College for Women. The other side has one male and two female figures portraying today's students.
20		Landis Hall	When Landis Hall opened in 1939, it was designated for seniors and was the largest dormitory. Residents had special privileges that included a smoking parlor and late curfew. The dorm today is designated for 400 co-ed honor students.
21		Kissing Bench	A bench inscribed with the phrase "If this bench could talk/oh the stories it would tell/of kisses young and old/if you sit, beware the spell".
22		William Johnston Building	The entire Johnston Building was the “Dining Hall” for nearly 60 years. The structure included a creamery, a bakery, a cannery, one informal and two formal dining rooms, and a private President's dining area for faculty. The section of the building facing east still houses the original Suwannee Dining Hall which has been renovated. It was the dining hall for the Florida State College for Women, constructed in 1913. The “Dining Hall Girls” were students who paid their tuition by serving three meals per day to fellow students.
22a		Suwannee Dining Hall	Suwannee Dining Hall was closed to students in the late 60s after a fire in the Westcott Building. Administrative offices from Westcott relocated to Suwannee and remained there for over 30 years. President T. K. Wetherell completely renovated Suwannee to its former use. The soaring vaulted ceilings have hand-carved Gothic arches. The light fixtures are original, stored in the attic, were re-installed to their original glory and the Hall reopened in 2006. Artifacts in showcases are aligned in the entry hall.
23		The Greek Park	In recognition of FSU's sororities and fraternities, PanHellenic groups were encouraged to commemorate their leadership legacies in a dedicated green space. Chi Omega sorority dedicated a 15-foot tall bronze statue, “Three Sisters”. Alpha Delta Pi sorority celebrated their centennial by renovating the pavilion in the park. The “Alpha Delta Pi Meditation Pavilion” has Gothic arches, stained glass windows containing ADPi symbology and a clock made of cast-iron. The park also contains other historic markers and heirloom camellias.
24		FSU South Gate	The South Gate is located on Jefferson Street across from the iconic “Sweet Shop”. This gateway, in Collegiate Gothic style, was built in 1933. It was a gift from the FSCW classes of 1933 and 1935 and designed by campus engineer, Herbert C. Mendenhall. It matches the original East Gate on Westcott Plaza and was one of three gates in the gift. The North and West gates did not survive the passage of years.
25		Gilchrist Hall	The structure honors Florida Governor Albert W. Gilchrist. The three-story dormitory was constructed in 1926; west and south wings were added in 1928.
26		Broward Hall	The third brick dorm at FSCW honored Florida Governor Napoleon B. Broward. Broward Hall was built in 1917 in response to a student housing shortage.
27		Bryan Hall	The oldest campus building was constructed in 1907 and named for US Senator William James Bryan from Jacksonville. Bryan Hall is connected to both Jennie Murphree Hall and Suwannee Dining Hall.
28		Sundial at Bryan Hall	The sundial contains the names of the members of the freshman class who gifted it to the university in 1917.
29		Dodd Hall	Dodd Hall, built in 1923, was the library for Florida State College for Women and was FSU's original library until Strozier opened in 1956. It is an ornate example of Collegiate Gothic architecture and was named for William George Dodd, longtime Dean of the College of Arts and Sciences. The Werkmeister Humanities Reading Room was established after a 1991 renovation and the 10'x22' Werkmeister Window was unveiled in 1997. In the years since, almost 40 smaller windows have been added and the space became home to the FSU Heritage Museum.
30		Williams Building	Originally known as the History Building, it was built in 1927 but named for Arthur Williams, the first history department chairman in 1963. In addition to classrooms, the Augusta Conradi Theatre is located there. A bronze statue of Edward Conradi, who was FSCW President from 1909 to 1941, is located outside on the east side.
31		Diffenbaugh Building	The Diffenbaugh Building, built in 1922, was Science Hall. As the third academic facility built on campus, it was modernized and enlarged, but the original Gothic entrance was incorporated into the renovation. Especially memorable to students & alumni for the walk up the hill to Diffenbaugh.
32		Frances Eppes statue	Removed from Legacy Walk and campus

== See also ==
- History of Florida State University
- List of presidents of Florida State University
- Landmarks and Monuments of Florida State University
