= Statue of Francis W. Eppes =

Coordinates: 30°26′27.4″N 84°17′28.3″W

The Eppes Statue is a monument of Francis W. Eppes that is located in Tallahassee, Florida. The bronze sculpture sits in front of the Westcott Building on Florida State University's campus. It was commissioned by FSU president Sandy D'Alemberte to honor one of Florida State University's founders. This monument was created by sculptor Edward Jonas and was unveiled to the public eye on January 24, 2002.

The statue was the starting point for Florida State University's Legacy Walk, a campus improvement project that began in 1989. The Legacy Walk includes multiple bronze statues around campus, reflecting the history and pride of the school's students and alumni. The Eppes statue's symbolism dates back to the original formation of the school as a Seminary, remembering Eppes' role as one of the prominent founders of the school to support a higher education in Tallahassee. The statue was removed from the Legacy Walk in 2018, and permanently removed from campus display in 2020 due to Eppes' history as a slave owner and Confederate supporter.

== History ==
Francis W. Eppes was the grandson of Thomas Jefferson. Jefferson's influence on Eppes was very apparent throughout his life, but no more evident than in Eppes' perseverance to establish an institution in Tallahassee of higher education. Eppes was among the group of men in 1836 who petitioned to Congress for the organization of an institution nearby. The plea failed but Eppes was determined and later appealed to the Florida Legislature. The Legislature passed an act in 1851 that commissioned two institutions in the state.

Eppes, as the intendent of Tallahassee, introduced a proposal to the Legislature in 1856 that aimed to establish one of the two institutions in Tallahassee. Through offering a building, thousands of dollars, and annual endowments to the school, Eppes was able to convince Legislature to pass the act. It was approved in 1857, thus marking the founding of the forebear of Florida State University.

Francis Eppes was appointed to the Board of Education where he served for eleven years, eight of which he was the president of. The board was in charge of managing the property, regulating finances, appointing teachers, determining their salaries, and establishing their duties.

Eppes' constant effort in creating this academy is what led to the expansion of a great institution, the Florida State University. For that reason, in January 2002, the Eppes statue was unveiled on Florida State's campus, nearly 150 years after the founding of the university.

On the plaque next to the monument, Francis W. Eppes is declared as the founder of Florida State University.

== Creation ==
When designing the statue, Jonas thought carefully about the direction Francis Eppes was facing on the bench. Eppes is seated on the bench with his body angled towards the rest of Tallahassee rather than towards the university as a symbol of the criticisms he faced. One of those criticisms was that the original campus location was too far west of town.

When it came time to actually carve the statue, Jonas was unsure how to proceed. There were only two known portraits of Eppes in existence, one of which was from when he was five years old.

According to Jonas himself, the most difficult part of modeling the statue was attaining Eppes' likeness. Since there were no records of his appearance, the sculptor frequently had to use photographs of his descendants to construct the facial features. He also did extensive research into clothing styles from the 1850s as this sculpture was created until 1999. The final difficulty he faced, unrelated to Eppes' facial appearance, was how to make the statue's eyes look lifelike.

== Modern controversy ==
In 2016, a proposal to remove the statue of Francis Eppes from its Westcott Fountain location and to remove his last name from one of the school's academic buildings was brought to the Student Government Association (SGA) by the Students for a Democratic Society. Due to Eppes history as a slave owner and other acts of his to support the Confederate cause, such as night watches to catch slaves in the streets of Tallahassee, the Students for a Democratic Society felt his presence on campus was in a way "honoring slave owners and those that enforced slavery".

According to the referendum, the Students for a Democratic Society stated:

"We, the students of Florida State University, do not believe in honoring slave owners and those that enforced slavery. Therefore, we demand President John Thrasher, and the FSU Board of Trustees, remove the Francis Eppes Monument in front of the Westcott Building and rename Eppes Hall to remove Francis Eppes’ name. Do you agree? Yes or No."

A Facebook page titled "Keep Eppes" was created in 2016 to support, and encourage other students for, the keeping of the statue, the anonymous creator's main stance being:

Francis Eppes is integral to the founding of the University, and should continue to be honored."

Although able to acquire the necessary 500 signatures to bring the referendum to the SGA, on October 19, 2016, the students of Florida State University overwhelmingly defeated the proposal, with 71.7% against and 28.3% for the removal. Turnout was roughly 6,000 out of a student body of more than 40,000 or 15% of the student body.

Katherine Draken, president of the Students for a Democratic Society, told the Tallahassee Democrat: "This kind of confirms what I already knew ... we have a lot of work to do in building a progressive movement at FSU", she said, following the announcement on the vote. "SDS is going to continue to fight against the legacy of slavery at FSU, dropping black enrollment and other forms of oppression."

The statue was removed from the Legacy Walk in July 2018, though it was soon relocated to Mina Jo Powell Alumni Green in May 2019.

In July 2020, FSU President John Thrasher ordered the Eppes statue permanently removed from campus display and announced the formation of a President's Task Force on Anti-Racism, Equality, and Inclusion.

== See also ==
- Bronze Sculpture
- Florida State University
- Francis W. Eppes
- Jefferson–Eppes Trophy
