= Attorney General Wescott =

Attorney General Wescott may refer to:

- James Westcott (1802–1880), Attorney General of the Territory of Florida
- James Westcott III (1839–1887), Attorney General of Florida
