= Jefferson–Eppes Trophy =

American college football trophy

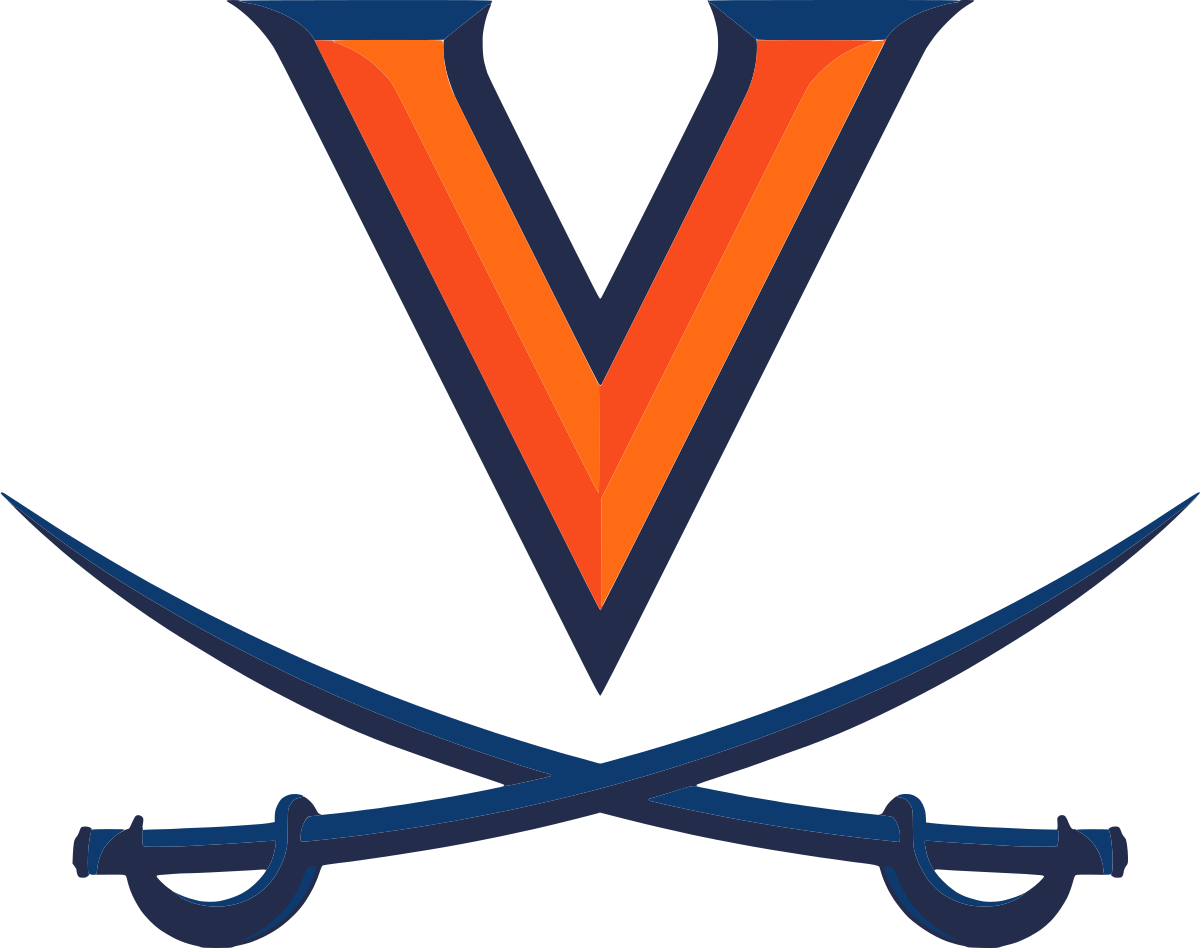
- Florida State Seminoles Virginia Cavaliers
- Sport: Football
- First meeting: October 31, 1992; Florida State 13, Virginia 3
- Latest meeting: October 3, 2026; Florida State 38, Virginia 7
- Trophy: Jefferson–Eppes Trophy

Statistics
- Total meetings: 21
- All-time series: Florida State leads, 15–5
- Largest victory: Florida State, 43–7 (2001)
- Longest win streak: Florida State, 9 (1996–2004)
- Current win streak: Florida State, 1 (2026–present)

Locations of Florida State and Virginia

The Jefferson–Eppes Trophy is an American college football trophy given to the winner of irregularly played games between the Florida State Seminoles of Florida State University and the Virginia Cavaliers of the University of Virginia. The trophy was created on the suggestion of former FSU President Sandy D'Alemberte, after Virginia became the first ACC program to defeat Florida State on November 2, 1995. To that point, the Seminoles had run up a perfect 29–0 record through their first 3½ years of Atlantic Coast Conference play.

Virginia and Florida State played each other yearly between 1992 and 2006, but the game never became a major rivalry (e.g., called "one of the lesser known rivalries in college football" by the Orlando Sentinel). The annual game was not preserved by the ACC when its divisional play began, and the Cavaliers and Seminoles began facing off much more rarely. In recent decades, the games are sporadic but competitive: since 2010, the teams are tied with three wins each. Florida State won the most recent game in 2026 and currently possesses the trophy.

== Eppes, Trophy, and Statue ==
This football trophy was created in 1995 by Florida State president Sandy D'Alemberte and was named for former President of the United States and founder of the University of Virginia, Thomas Jefferson, and Jefferson's grandson Francis W. Eppes, a two-time mayor of Tallahassee. In 1856, he presented the offer of a building and funds to the State Assembly of Florida to have the West Florida Seminary located at Tallahassee (now Florida State University). The Seminary later evolved into FSU. Thomas Jefferson's youngest daughter was Mary Jefferson Eppes, mother of Francis Eppes. Her death, in 1804, prompted Abigail Adams to thaw relations between the Adams and Jefferson families by writing her condolences to Thomas Jefferson. Francis was only three years old when his mother died and had no memory of her.

Seven years after this football trophy was created, an Eppes statue was created and placed as a focal point of the FSU Legacy Walk in 2002. Former Florida State president D'Alemberte also spearheaded this effort. The Eppes statue later became controversial, in 2016, due to Eppes' history of expanding his slave ownership to encompass several working cotton plantations prior to the American Civil War, supporting the Confederacy in various ways, and organizing night watches to catch slaves in the streets of territorial Tallahassee. Despite this history, FSU students voted by a large margin, 72% to 28%, to keep the Eppes statue. The Florida State administration moved its location in 2018. However, in January 2021, FSU President John Thrasher ordered Eppes' name be removed from the College of Criminology building and the Eppes statue permanently removed from campus display. The announcement came after Thrasher decided to accept the recommendations from the President's Task Force on Anti-Racism, Equality, and Inclusion.

== Construction ==
The trophy is composed of an intricately wrought silver pitcher presented to the city of Tallahassee, Florida, by Eppes in 1842 and set upon a wood base made of remains of the McGuffey Ash, which was once the largest tree on the Grounds of the University of Virginia but suffered a fatal tree disease in 1990. The trophy was designed by Ryan Parker.

== Game results ==
Florida State victories	Virginia victories

No.	Date	Location	Winning team		Losing team	
1	October 31, 1992	Charlottesville, VA	#6 Florida State	13	#23 Virginia	3
2	October 16, 1993	Tallahassee, FL	#1 Florida State	40	#15 Virginia	14
3	September 3, 1994	Tallahassee, FL	#4 Florida State	41	Virginia	17
4	November 2, 1995	Charlottesville, VA	#24 Virginia	33	#2 Florida State	28
5	October 26, 1996	Tallahassee, FL	#3 Florida State	31	#14 Virginia	24
6	October 25, 1997	Charlottesville, VA	#3 Florida State	47	Virginia	21
7	November 7, 1998	Tallahassee, FL	#6 Florida State	45	#12 Virginia	14
8	October 30, 1999	Charlottesville, VA	#1 Florida State	35	Virginia	10
9	October 21, 2000	Tallahassee, FL	#6 Florida State	37	Virginia	3
10	October 20, 2001	Charlottesville, VA	#21 Florida State	43	Virginia	7
11	August 31, 2002	Tallahassee, FL	#5 Florida State	40	Virginia	19
12	October 18, 2003	Charlottesville, VA	#7 Florida State	19	Virginia	14
13	October 16, 2004	Tallahassee, FL	#7 Florida State	36	#6 Virginia	3
14	October 15, 2005	Charlottesville, VA	Virginia	26	#4 Florida State	21
15	November 4, 2006	Tallahassee, FL	Florida State†	33	Virginia	0
16	October 2, 2010	Charlottesville, VA	Florida State	34	Virginia	14
17	November 19, 2011	Tallahassee, FL	Virginia	14	#23 Florida State	13
18	November 8, 2014	Tallahassee, FL	#2 Florida State	34	Virginia	20
19	September 14, 2019	Charlottesville, VA	#25 Virginia	31	Florida State	24
20	September 26, 2025	Charlottesville, VA	Virginia	46	#8 Florida State	38^{2OT}
21	October 3, 2026	Tallahassee, FL	Florida State	38	Virginia	7
Series: Florida State leads 15–5
† Vacated by Florida State

== See also ==
- List of NCAA college football rivalry games
