= Attorney General Meek =

Attorney General Meek may refer to:

- A. R. Meek (1834–1888), Attorney General of Florida
- Alexander Beaufort Meek (1814–1865), Attorney General of Alabama
