= Ruby Diamond =

American philanthropist (1886–1982)

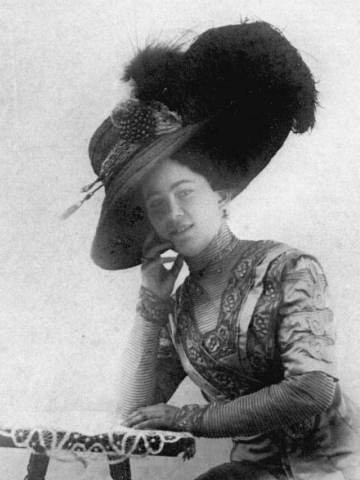
- Diamond in 1910
- Born: Ruby Pearl Diamond; September 1, 1886; Tallahassee, Florida, U.S.
- Died: March 8, 1982 (aged 95); Tallahassee, Florida, U.S.
- Education: Florida State College
- Occupations: Businesswoman; philanthropist

Ruby Pearl Diamond (September 1, 1886 – March 8, 1982) was an American businessperson and philanthropist from Tallahassee, Florida, known for her support of a wide array of charitable causes, especially racial equality, Jewish life, and Florida State University. Over her life, Diamond gained a reputation as a "shrewd" businessperson.

== Family ==
Ruby Pearl Diamond was from a Jewish family. At the conclusion of the Civil War, her grandparents, Robert Williams and Helena Dzialynsky, relocated with their five daughters from Jasper, Florida, to Tallahassee. The family had some wealth and opened a store before purchasing three plantations for cotton production.

The Weekly Floridian dubbed Williams the "King of the Jews" in Tallahassee. He donated a Torah to the small Jewish community. All five of his daughters married Jewish men.

Williams's daughter Henrietta married Julius Diamond, a Tallahassee merchant and city commissioner in 1879. Diamond had emigrated from Prussia after the Civil War and was an early merchant in Tallahassee who owned several downtown buildings, an insurance business and farmland.

Henrietta and Julius Diamond had two children. Sydney Hamilton was born in 1883 and Ruby Pearl in 1886. Sydney became a well-known Tallahassee attorney.

== Education ==
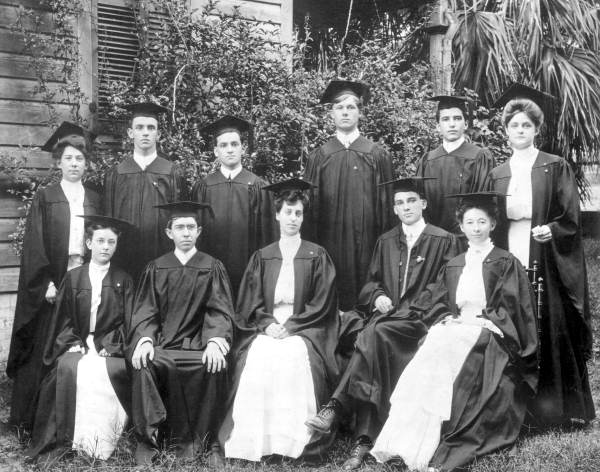
Diamond is among her classmates in this photograph of the Florida State College graduating class of 1905.

In 1905, Diamond graduated from Florida State College (renamed Florida State College for Women in 1905, then Florida State University in 1947), earning a degree in chemistry. Her graduating class had 11 students, almost equally split between women and men. Despite having a bachelor's degree, Diamond once said that she "wasn't taught to do a blessed thing on earth but smile".

== Later life ==
On the death of her father in 1914, Diamond inherited the family mercantile store, the family home, and other properties in downtown Tallahassee. She sold the store, but kept and managed the downtown real estate and buildings for several decades. Following her mother's death in 1924, the family home was sold. Ruby moved into the Floridan Hotel after it opened in 1927. For many years the hotel was the newest, largest, and preferred hotel in Tallahassee. Many state legislators stayed there during legislative sessions. A common joke was that more of Florida's business took place in the Floridan than at the Capitol building. She lived there until 1978. When the Floridan went out of business, Diamond moved to the Hilton Hotel, where she remained until her death.

Guests at her 90th birthday party included Florida Governor Reubin Askew, U.S. Senator Richard Stone, and Florida Attorney General Robert Shevin. Diamond died on March 8, 1982.

== Philanthropy ==
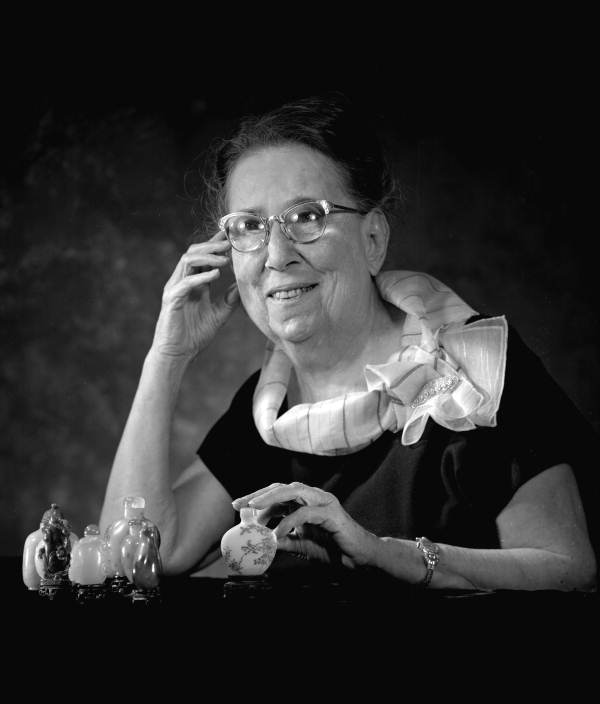
1969 portrait of Diamond with her collection of snuff bottles

During her life, Diamond was known to be a generous philanthropist, contributing to at least thirty-seven organizations. Contributions went to early childhood education programs, the Salvation Army, nursing homes, hospitals, Black charities, research institutions, and Tallahassee's Temple Israel.

She was a significant benefactor to Florida State University, donating properties worth six figures during the 1970s and 1980s that partially endowed a chair in the College of Education. She also established two scholarships for disadvantaged scholars, and gave to the Alumni Association and the Department of Educational Research, Development, and Foundations. She was a Century Club contributor to the Florida A&M University Foundation Development Fund.

In 1970, Florida State University named the largest auditorium on campus the Ruby Diamond Auditorium. Following a $38 million renovation, it was renamed in 2010 as the Ruby Diamond Concert Hall. Designated the primary performance venue for Florida State University, it is on the first floor of the Westcott Building.

=== Ruby Diamond Foundation ===
Ruby Diamond Foundation
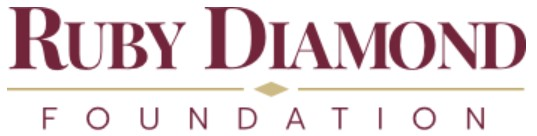
- Formation: December 31, 1983; 42 years ago
- Type: Nonprofit
- Tax ID no.: 59-6781684
- Legal status: 501(c)(3)
- Headquarters: Tallahassee, Florida
- Region served: United States
- Main organ: Trustees (3)
- Revenue: $268,576 (2022)
- Expenses: $365,316 (2022)
- Endowment: $6,006,156 (2022)
- Staff: 0
- Website: https://rubydiamondfoundation.org/

She willed her estate to the Ruby Diamond Foundation, a charitable trust to continue support for 24 nonprofit entities. As of 2022, since beginning its giving in 1984, the foundation had distributed more than $6 million.

== Personal life ==
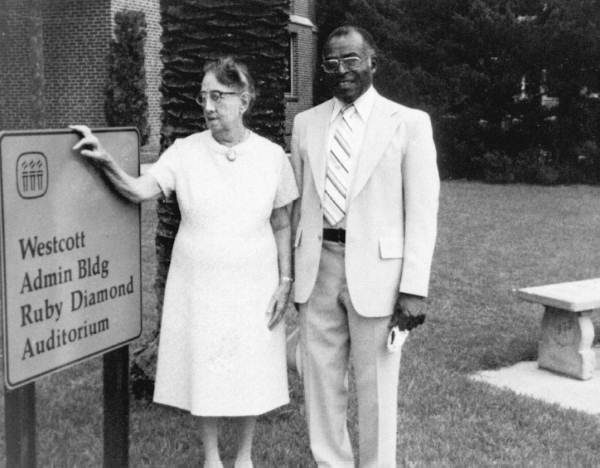
Ruby Pearl Diamond with her chauffeur and companion, "Smiley" Bruce

Diamond was known to her friends as "Miss Ruby". She was engaged twice, but never married. Newspaper accounts stated that both fiancés died before the marriages could occur.

Throughout her life, Diamond employed a driver and a caretaker, both of whom were black, garnering a comparison to Miss Daisy of the 1987 play Driving Miss Daisy, another single, wealthy Jewish woman. She was likened to Gertrude Weil from Goldsboro, North Carolina, as well. Both were late 19th-century progressive women from the upper-class, college educated, unmarried, and well-known philanthropists who lived in their hometown for their long lives. While Weil appeared to be more liberal and was more well-known regionally and nationally, Diamond was somewhat eccentric, but unique.

Diamond began a project in 1945 that she called the "Diamond Vegetable Basket". Each year she provided a coupon for fertilizer and vegetable seed to each welfare recipient in Leon County. Diamond stated, "It gives the elderly people a feeling of welcome and security at mealtime when told that the vegetables came from their own garden." Inspiration came from her father, who was Leon County commission chairman for ten years. Julius Diamond provided vegetable seed for area farmers.

Diamond was a life member of the Florida State Alumni Association, the Florida Historical Society, the Tallahassee Women's Club, the Tallahassee-Leon County Humane Society, and the Florida United Numismatic Association. She was an active member of the Oleander Garden Circle, Tallahassee Historical Society, LeMoyne Art Foundation, and Tallahassee Junior Museum.

Diamond was a philatelist and numismatist. She was also active politically and fought for racial equality and lower taxes.

Ruby and Sydney Diamond joined other Jewish community members to found Temple Israel in 1937. Diamond and her foundation were the temple's largest contributors.
