= Dodd Hall =

US historic building in Florida

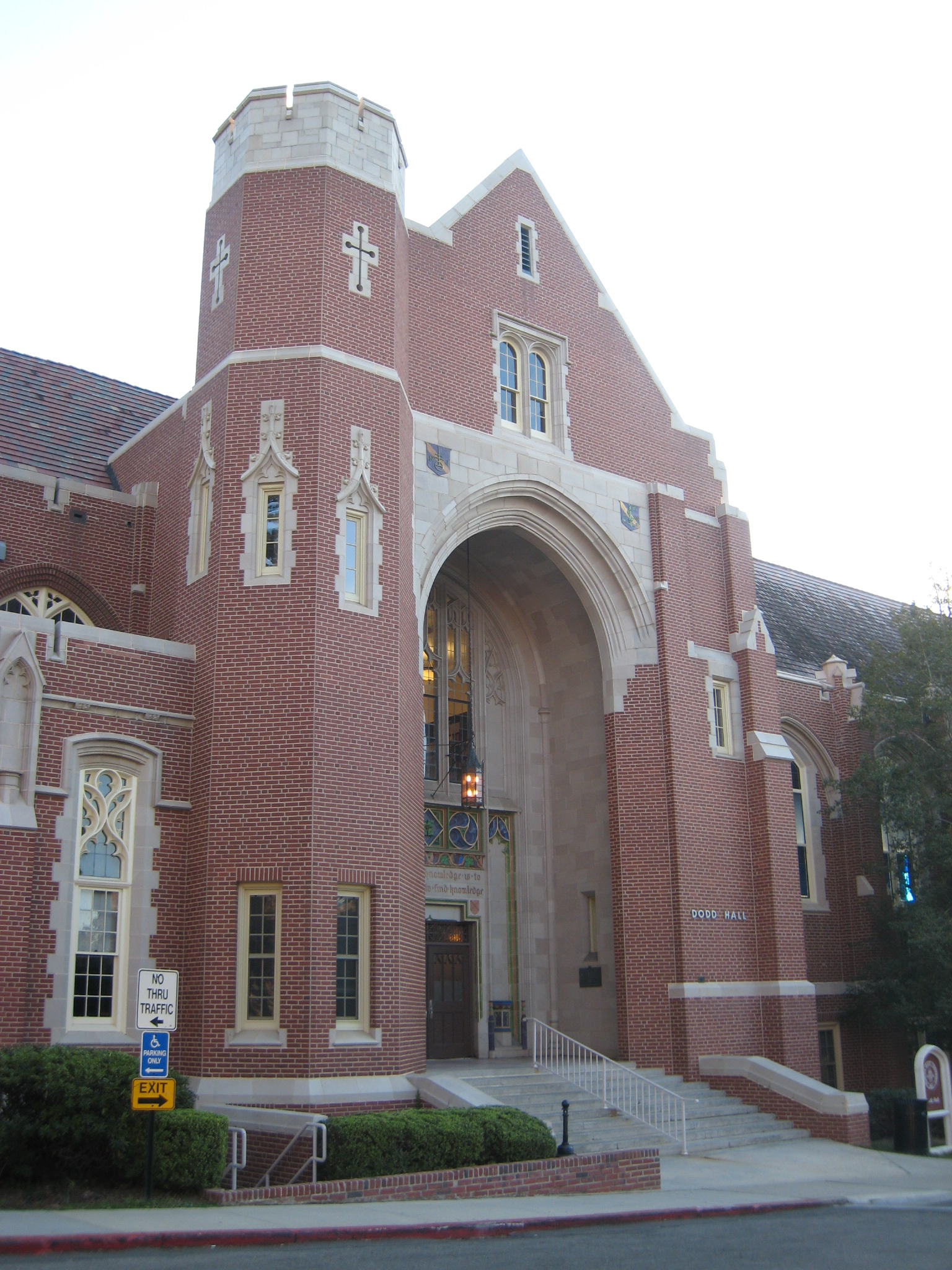
- Dodd Hall
- Interactive map of the Dodd Hall area

General information
- Type: Administration Offices; Auditorium; Museum
- Architectural style: Collegiate Gothic
- Location: 641 University Way, Tallahassee, Florida 32306
- Coordinates: 30.440224°N 84.292609°W
- Named for: William George Dodd
- Completed: 1923

Design and construction
- Architect: William Augustus Edwards

Website
- Dodd Hall

Dodd Hall is a historic structure on the campus of Florida State University in Tallahassee, Florida. The building currently houses the Department of Religion offices for Florida State University. The building is also home to the Heritage Museum and an ornate exemplification of Collegiate Gothic architecture.

== History ==
A structure in the Collegiate Gothic style of architecture was built in 1923 to serve as the library for the Florida State College for Women. A smaller west wing was constructed in 1925, while larger south and east wings were built between 1928 and 1929.

Above the main entrance is the phrase, "The half of knowledge is to know where to find knowledge." Inside the lobby is a painted ceiling and a large mural donated by the Class of 1949, "The University, Sunrise to Sunset" by Artemis Housewright, an FSU alumna. The artwork depicts school history as well as local fauna and flora.

It was FSU's main library until the Strozier Library was constructed in 1956. After the library moved to Strozier, the building was home to the College of Arts and Sciences, the Department of Philosophy and WFSU-TV, which housed its studio there from 1960 until 1982. The building was named in 1961 for William George Dodd, an English professor who accepted a position with the FSCW in 1910 and became Dean of the College of Arts and Sciences until 1944.

The Claude and Mildred Pepper Library opened in 1985 at Dodd Hall. It remained there until the new Pepper Center was dedicated in 1998.

Dodd Hall received a complete renovation in 1991 but retained both exterior and interior architectural integrity as did its Auditorium, completed in 1993.

== Reading room ==
The Werkmeister Humanities Reading Room opened in 1991 as a quiet place for student study in Dodd Hall's west wing. It was named for Professor William H. Werkmeister and his wife, Dr. Lucyle T. Werkmeister in the Department of Philosophy. The professor was one of the nation's foremost authorities in the field of philosophy and authored the book, "History of Philosophical Ideas in America", printed in 1949. Department lectures and symposia were often held in Werkmeister. On October 31, 1997, the Werkmeister Window was unveiled and dedicated. The design was by Professor Emeritus Ivan Johnson, crafted by Bob and JoAnn Bischoff, and depicts four well-known FSU buildings. The window took a decade to build and is composed of over 10,000 glass pieces. It stands 22 feet tall, ten feet wide, and completed the first phase of renovation.

For the eleventh annual Heritage Day, sixteen stained glass windows were unveiled and dedicated on April 8, 2011, in the Werkmeister. The windows were created by students enrolled in the Master Craftsman Program at FSU over a dozen years with money from private gifts and donations of individuals, classes and other groups. Six different groups of students worked on the windows, guided by Bob and JoAnn Bischoff.

In the years since, the Master Craftsman Studio continues their work creating and installing leaded-glass Commemorative Windows in the Heritage Museum of Dodd Hall.

Window depictions include:

- Osceola & Renegade
- Heritage Tower
- the Emeritus Alumni Society
- the Tarpon Club: Synchronized Swimming
- the Women's "F" Club: Athletic Honorary Society
- Montgomery Gym
- Intercollegiate athletics
- Marching Chiefs
- FSU Circus
- [FSU Gymnastics Team
- Gymkana Show Troupe
- Westcott Legacy Society
- FSU Foundation
- Lady Seminoles: Women's athletics
- Seminole Boosters
- Gymnastics Championship 1951
- Senator "Jim" King & Linda King
- College of Education
- Burning Spear Society
- Seminole Tribe of Florida
- The President's House: A Tribute to the First Ladies of FSU
- President Emeritus Doak S. Campbell
- Longmire Building: Original Home of the Alumni Association
- Women for Florida State University
- Art Education and Constructive Design: Professor Emeritus Ivan Johnson
- President Emeritus T.K. Wetherell
- Class of 1948, the First Graduating Class of FSU
- Class of 1946, the Last Graduating Class of FSCW
- Jim Moran College of Entrepreneurship
- FSU Graduate School Dean Nancy Marcus
- Professor of Music André J. Thomas: Chorus
- FSU Association of Retired Faculty
- College of Human Sciences: Healthy Living
- FSU Veterans: Past, Present & Future
- Sir Harry Kroto "Nobel Prize in Chemistry 1996"
- Governor Reubin O'D Askew: "Integrity"
- Asolo Conservatory for Actor Training
- Paul A.M. Dirac "Nobel Prize in Physics 1933"
- President Emeritus "Sandy" D'Alemberte

== Present use ==
The Religion Department is currently housed in Dodd; faculty offices occupy the entire east wing. The Religion collections are placed in a large, renovated library on the third floor. The M. Lynette Thompson Classics Library is on one side. Dodd Hall is also the meeting place of the William Dodd Society, founded in 2024, which engages in discussions similar to debates.

== Heritage Museum ==
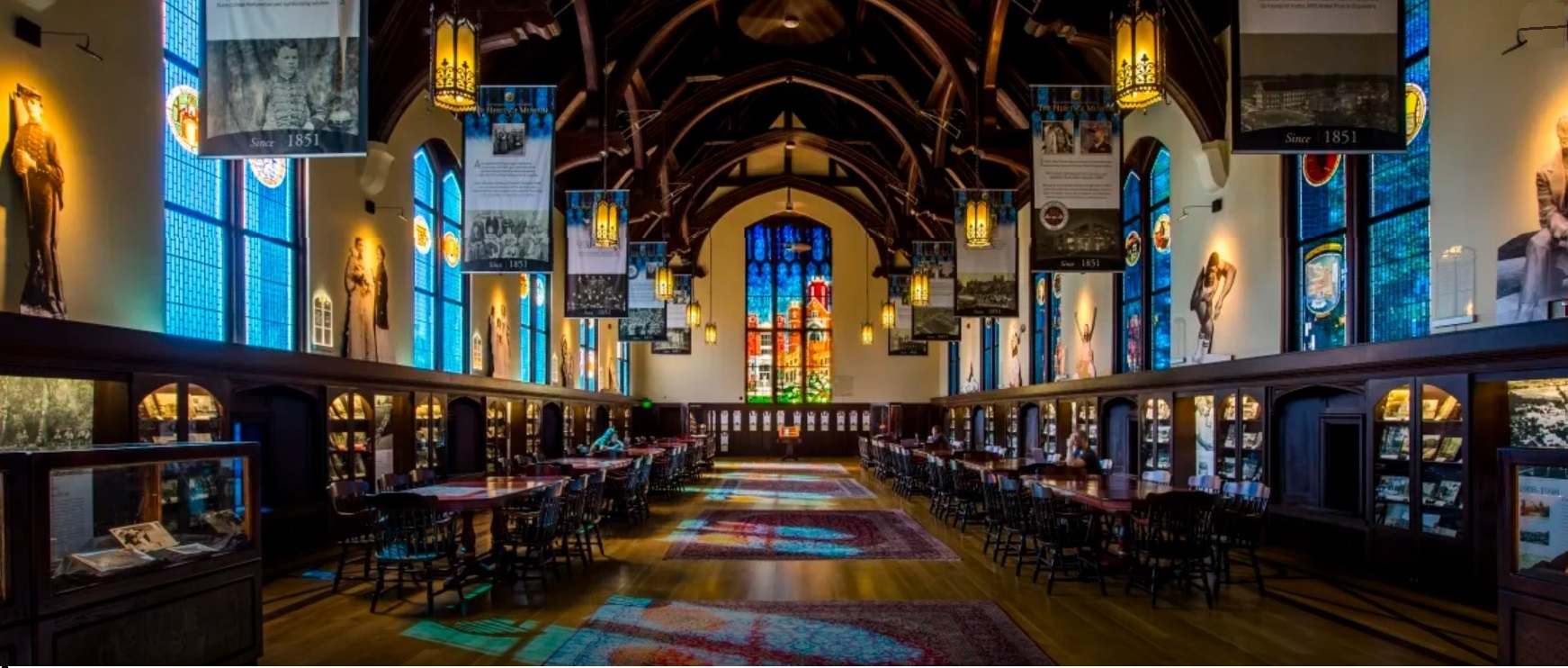
Heritage Museum

The Werkmeister Humanities Reading Room is now the location of the FSU Heritage Museum. The displays of photographs, ephemera, and various artifacts that document the history of the University change periodically because the museum was intended to be dynamic so that visitors and alumni would find something different each time they stop by.

Since 2011, donors and alumni have commissioned additional windows to commemorate individuals and legacy organizations that helped Florida State University grow and succeed. At last count, there were nearly 40. Public visitation is encouraged during normal business hours. Exhibit curation and archival support for artifact donations is provided by Strozier Library faculty and archivists.

== Notability ==
Dodd Hall was ranked as the tenth favorite structure on AIA's Florida Chapter list of "Florida Architecture: 100 Years. 100 Places".

== See also ==
- Florida State University
- History of Florida State University
