= Florida State University Schools =

Location
- 3000 School House Road; Tallahassee, Florida 32331; United States; 30°23′05″N 84°13′22″W

Information
- Type: Laboratory school
- Established: 1851
- Principal: Suzanne Wilkinson (K–8); Megan Brink (9–12)
- Campus Director: Christopher Small
- Grades: K–12
- Enrollment: 1,871 (2023-2024)
- Colors: Garnet and gold
- Team name: Seminoles
- Affiliation: Florida State University College of Education
- Website: www.fsus.school

Florida State University Schools (FSUS) is a laboratory school located in Tallahassee, Florida, United States. It is sponsored by Florida State University and works in close collaboration with the Florida State University College of Education. The school is often referred to as Florida High School, or "Florida High", though it actually serves grades kindergarten through 12th.

== History ==
From 1920 to 1950, the school was K-6 and was called the college's Demonstration School.

In 1950, the school expanded to K-9, and its basketball and baseball teams started playing in the North Florida Conference.

The sports teams started calling themselves The Demons, short for Demonstration School.

In 1953, its baseball team was the North Florida champion.

During 1952-54, FSU constructed a new building for the K-12 school.

In 1954, the first year the school occupied its own building, it started a football team and played in the North Florida Conference.

In 1955, its basketball team defeated Leon High School, the other (white) high school in Tallahassee.

Also in 1955, the school's football team had its first winning year, and the school started its first marching band.

In 1955-6, the school greatly increased the activities available to the students.

Until 2001, the school was located on the FSU campus.

In 2001, the new Florida High building in Southwood was opened.

== Relationship with FSU ==
FSUS is sponsored by Florida State University and is a demonstration school for the FSU College of Education, which is used for exploring teaching techniques as well as being an education center where teachers may observe and participate in best teacher practices; and a vehicle for the dissemination of research findings. FSUS and the FSU College of Education collaborate for research, observations, etc., as well as Florida State University, Tallahassee Community College, and Florida A&M University.

After the school's relocation to Southwood, there was some consideration of the school severing its ties with the university. However, that proposal was rejected by Florida High's faculty.

== Student body ==
Florida High has approximately 1700 students who represent Florida's population demographics. The school has programs in academics, art, foreign language, and athletics.

== Sports ==
In 2007, Florida High's girls basketball team defeated Parkway High School to win the 3A State Championship. That same year, Florida High's football team posted a perfect regular season record including a 40-0 shutout of Leon County High School. The school's mascot were the "Demons", but were renamed after the Florida State Seminoles in 1995.

== Notable alumni ==
- Caroline Alexander — American Author and journalist
- Jimmy Ray Bennett — American Actor
- Brett Blizzard (Class of 1999) — Professional basketball player in Italy
- Tre Donaldson (Class of 2022) - college basketball player
- Ashton Hampton (Class of 2024) – college football cornerback for the Clemson Tigers
- Ronnie Harrison (Class of 2015) - American football player
- Ahmari Harvey (Class of 2021) – NFL cornerback for the Denver Broncos
- Link Jarrett (Class of 1990) – Former professional baseball player and current head baseball coach at Florida State University.
- Brandon Jenkins (Class of 2009) – American football player
- Dr. Will Kirby (Class of 1991) – Celebrity dermatologist, medical authority, winner of Big Brother and star of Dr. 90210
- Jaylen Martin (Class of 2022) - NBA basketball player for the New York Knicks
- Martin Mayhew (Class of 1983) – American football player and executive in the National Football League (NFL)
- Garrett McGhin (Class of 2014) - American football player
- John W. Olsen (Class of 1973) - Regents' Professor Emeritus of Anthropology, University of Arizona; archaeologist and explorer of Central Asia
- Dean Palmer – Professional baseball player in Major League Baseball (MLB)
- Diane Roberts - Author and commentator
- David Ross (Class of 1995) - MLB catcher, two-time World Series champion, 2017 Dancing with the Stars runner-up, Chicago Cubs manager
- KJ Smith (Class of 2003) – Actress
