= Riley D. Housewright =

American microbiologist

- Housewright circa 1967
- Born: October 7, 1913; Wylie, Texas
- Died: January 11, 2003 (aged 89); Frederick, Maryland
- Education: BA, North Texas State College; MSc, University of Texas; PhD, University of Chicago, 1944
- Known for: Biological weapons research
- Scientific career
- Fields: Microbiology
- Institutions: Fort Detrick, 1943/4–1970; American Society for Microbiology; National Academy of Sciences

Riley D. Housewright (October 7, 1913 – January 11, 2003) was an American microbiologist who conducted research on germ warfare. Having been assigned to the Fort Detrick laboratory in the mid-1940s and appointed scientific director in 1956, Housewright played a major role in the development of bioweapons for a proposed attack on Cuba during the Cuban Missile Crisis. In 1966, he was appointed president of the American Society for Microbiology. He left Fort Detrick in 1970 following President Nixon's moratorium on US bioweapons research, and later published several books on water safety for the National Academy of Sciences. In the 1980s, Housewright became executive director of the American Society for Microbiology. He died in Frederick, Maryland, in 2003.

== Early life and education ==
Housewright was born in Wylie, Texas on October 7, 1913. He attended the teachers' college at North Texas State College for his bachelor's degree and earned a master's degree in microbiology from the University of Texas. In 1939, he married Marjorie Bryant, a fellow graduate of the teachers' college. Housewright was assigned to the Fort Detrick laboratory in Frederick, Maryland, in 1943 or 1944 as a naval lieutenant. He completed his PhD at the University of Chicago in 1944.

== Career ==
At the time that Housewright was appointed to Fort Detrick, the institution was an epicenter of biological warfare research. In his early years at Detrick, Housewright studied botulinum toxin and anthrax as potential weapons against the Germans and Japanese. He became head of the microbial physiology and chemotherapy department in 1946, and in 1950 was named chief of the medical bacteriology department. In 1956, Housewright was appointed scientific director of Fort Detrick.

During the Cuban Missile Crisis, Housewright worked with Pentagon officials to develop weapons for a potential germ warfare attack on Cuba. Under Housewright's direction, the scientists at Fort Detrick developed a cocktail of Coxiella burnetii, the causative agent of Q fever; Venezuelan equine encephalitis virus; and staphylococcal enterotoxin B. This mixture of microorganisms and toxins was intended to cause rapid and long-lasting incapacitation while posing little risk to American troops because of the agents' non-contagious nature. It was projected that this bioweapon could kill up to one percent of Cuba's population. Thousands of gallons of the agent were produced at the Pine Bluff Arsenal under the supervision of William C. Patrick III; however, the plan was never carried out. In 1969, president Richard Nixon announced that the US would cease all research into bioweapon development. Housewright left his post as scientific director the next year, taking up the role of vice president at a private microbiology company in Bethesda, Maryland.

Housewright retired from the Naval Reserve in 1966, having earned the rank of captain. The same year, he was elected president of the American Society for Microbiology. In his later career, Housewright was a staff officer and program director at the National Academy of Sciences. In this position, he carried out extensive studies on the safety of drinking water, publishing four books on the subject. He became executive director of the American Society for Microbiology in the 1980s.

== Personal life and death ==
Housewright's first wife died in 1962. He married Artemis Jegart, an artist from Florida, in the late 1960s. Housewright was a member of the Cosmos Club and director of the Rotary Club in Frederick, Maryland. Housewright died on January 11, 2003, at the age of 89, in an assisted living center in Frederick.
