= Westcott Building =

Historic building in Florida, United States

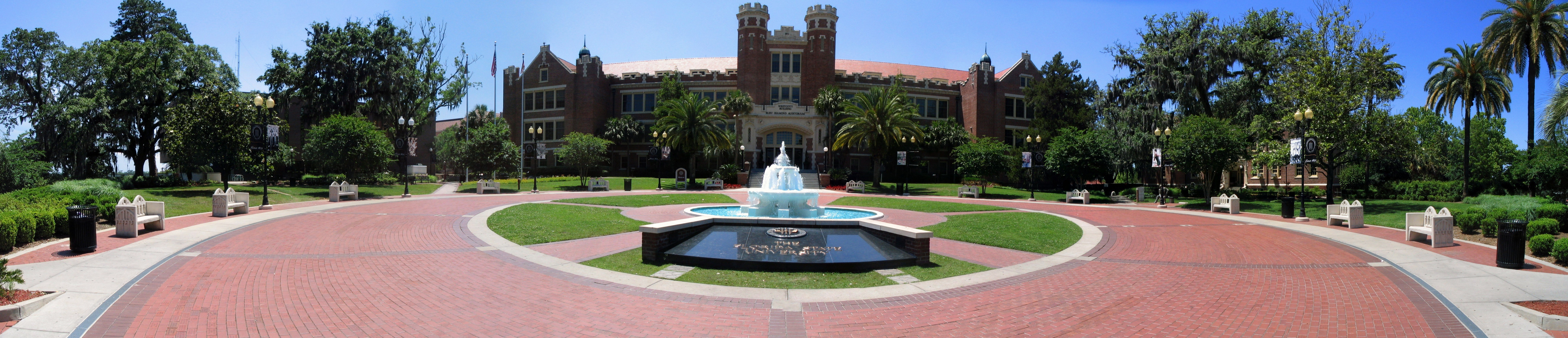
- Interactive map of the Westcott Building area

General information
- Type: Administration Offices; Auditorium
- Architectural style: Collegiate Gothic
- Location: Florida State University, Tallahassee, Florida, USA
- Coordinates: 30.4406686°N 84.2916516°W
- Named for: James Diament Westcott, Jr.
- Completed: 1910

Design and construction
- Architect: William Augustus Edwards

Website
- Westcott Building Page

The James D. Westcott Building is a historic building on the campus of The Florida State University in Tallahassee, in the U.S. state of Florida. The Westcott Building currently houses the chief administrative offices for Florida State University and is the primary focal point of the campus as seen down College Avenue. The building is also home to Ruby Diamond Auditorium. It is known for its distinctive appearance.

Built in 1910, the Westcott building was named after James Diament Westcott, Jr. who was an early contributor to the predecessor of Florida State University; his 1887 estate was valued at $100,000.

== History ==
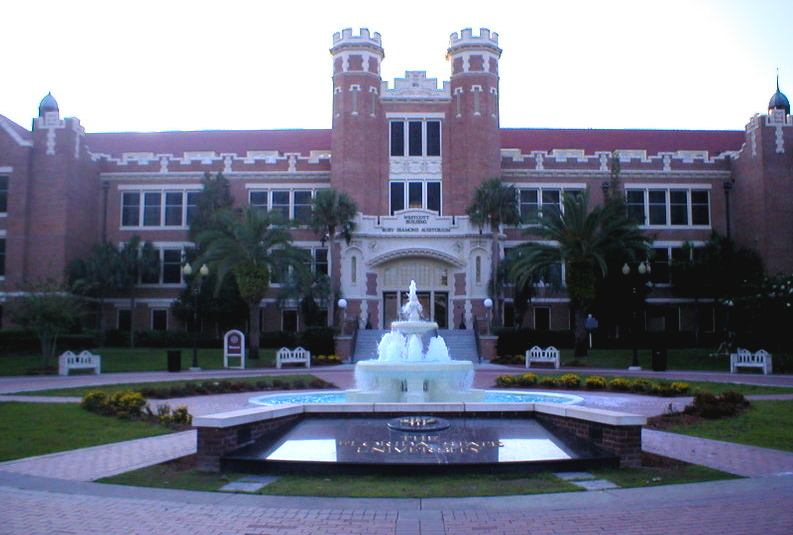
Westcott Plaza

The Westcott building was built in 1910 to serve as the Florida State College's administration building by which it was known until 1936. In that year the building was renamed the James D. Westcott, Jr. Memorial Building by then university president Edward Conradi in remembrance of the former Florida Supreme Court justice who had left a large part of his estate to what was then the West Florida Seminary in 1887.

In April 1969, much of the interior of the building was destroyed by a fire. Renovations of the interior of the building were completed in 1973 and were able to preserve the historic collegiate gothic exterior that the building is known for. This renovation created space for the John S. Knight and James L. Knight Foundation Lobby, which serves to welcome visitors and provide performance entertainment space for viewers. Two bronze doors at the entrance of the building lead to a hallway gallery of presidential portraits. Each individual portrait featured in the hallway portray a president whose vision drove the university to what it is today.

The circle in front of Westcott was first closed to traffic by former Florida State University President Sandy D’Alemberte in 1994. In 2005, former Florida State University President T. K. Wetherell took steps to complete the restoration work from the prior decade, which included the removal of mildew from the Westcott Building’s front and paving the fountain’s circle with bricks. Wetherell sought to preserve the Westcott area as a historic symbol of Florida State University, as most who have attended the school consider its twin brick towers, arch-style entry and fountain an iconic component of the school.

In the mid-2000s, Florida State University began developing its Legacy Walk—which leads pedestrians through a variety of walkways that display statues, busts and stained-glass windows of individuals who the University deems important to its history. The Legacy Walk begins at the Westcott building and its surrounding plaza at a bronze statue of Francis Eppes, a plantation owner who took an interest in educational issues in Florida. Although Eppes was an integral contributor to the eventual creation of Florida State University, his statue was the subject of a referendum for its removal in 2016, as The Students for a Democratic Society believed it should be removed due to Eppes' usage of slaves. The students voted to keep it, but the statue was removed from the Legacy Walk in 2018, and in January 2021 FSU President John E. Thrasher ordered Eppes' name be removed from the College of Criminology building and the Eppes statue permanently removed from campus display. The announcement came after Thrasher decided to accept the recommendations from the President's Task Force on Anti-Racism, Equality, and Inclusion.

During his presidency, Wetherall added more vegetation, improved irrigation, and more bricks to the Westcott fountain to further develop its atmosphere for students, residents and tourists alike. The surrounding asphalt around Westcott was removed and replaced with more green space and landscaping, including holly ferns, pink azaleas, Japanese maple trees and sago and coontie palms. Beneath the asphalt, Tallahassee architect Rodney Lewis claimed to have found a thousand bricks, which were reused in the legacy project. This campus-wide beautification project was estimated at $200,000. The Westcott area remains a popular place to capture graduation photos.

Westcott Fountain

== Westcott Fountain ==
Westcott fountain is a historic landmark on the campus of Florida State University. It sits at the end of College Avenue in front of the Westcott building. There is a large, marble plaque in front of the fountain with the Florida State University logo, used to welcome people to campus. Westcott fountain came into the possession of Florida State University in 1917 as a gift from the Florida State College for Women, classes of 1915 and 1917. Today, the fountain is a symbol of unity and heritage for Florida State University.

Westcott fountain sits in the center of Westcott Plaza, surrounded by engraved bricks. The bricks commemorate students, professors and others who have contributed to Florida State University. The Florida State University Alumni Association administers the "Brick Program." The brick plaza was a project of the classes of 1996 and 1997. Its construction in 1998 was possible through the generous donations of students, alumni, faculty, staff and more. The bricks are used to commemorate names, special dates and accomplishments and new bricks are installed every semester.

In 1982 the fountain was renovated in commemoration of Professor Anna Forbes Liddell. The fountain that is there today is however not the original one. Westcott fountain was replaced in 1988, due to failure of the original support system. Westcott fountain sits upon what was previously referred to as "Gallows Hill": during the 1830s, the hill was a site of executions. Westcott fountain has become a monument at Florida State University. It is a symbol of the University that sits at the main entrance to the school.

=== Traditions and myths ===
One of the longest standing traditions surrounding the Westcott fountain is being dunked in the water by a group of friends on their 21st birthdays as a way to welcome the person to the legal drinking age and it is said that one is not truly a Seminole until dunked in there.

Aside from the traditions that accompany the fountain, there are also many ghost stories that have been created surrounding it. Since the fountain is located on an old execution site, some students have reported hearing strange noises at night. There have been a few reports stating that the entire Westcott area is still haunted by the executed dead.

== Ruby Diamond Auditorium ==
Ruby Diamond was one of the thirteen members of Florida State University’s graduating class of 1905. Aside from being a political activist, Diamond made numerous donations to more than thirty-seven organizations. Two scholarships have been named in her honor as well as the auditorium inside of the Westcott Building, which is the largest auditorium on campus. The College of Music at Florida State University has six concert halls (Ruby Diamond Concert Hall, Opperman Music Hall, Dohnanyi Recital Hall, Lindsay Recital Hall, Longmire Recital Hall, and Owen Sellers Amphitheatre).

Ruby Diamond Auditorium is the primary performance venue for Florida State University and is located on the first floor of the Westcott building. Originally built in 1911 to serve as the main auditorium for the University, it was torn down in 1951 after developing a settling crack and was rebuilt in 1954. In 1970 the auditorium was named in honor of a generous benefactor to the University and a graduate of the Florida State College for Women.

Renovations on Ruby Diamond Auditorium began in April 2008, which were to include a new, expanded, lobby area and the expansion and remodeling of the northwestern wing of the auditorium. The renovations were finished in October 2010 and Ruby Diamond was officially opened with a concert on October 8, 2010. Total cost for the renovations was approximately $35 million.

Actual improvements on the auditorium are an increase in the size of the lobby bringing it to 11,000 square feet and increased facilities including ticket vendors and restrooms. The renovations on the auditorium also include increased seating capacity to 1,260, improved lighting, improved sound, and aesthetic changes in the auditorium proper. A rehearsal room was added behind the performance stage to allow for a simultaneous warm-up while another ensemble performs.

== See also ==
- Florida State University
- James Diament Westcott, Jr.
