= Artemis Jegart =

American painter (1927–2015)

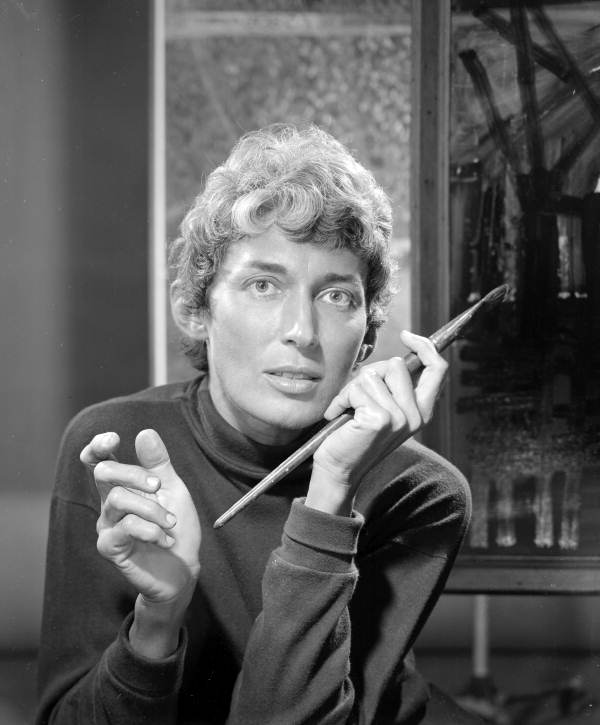
- Jegart in 1968
- Born: July 18, 1927
- Died: 2015 (aged 87–88)
- Other names: Artemis Housewright, Artemis Skevakis
- Occupations: painter, sculptor

Artemis Skevakis Jegart Housewright (July 18, 1927 – 2015) was an American painter and interior decorator from Florida, named one of the outstanding new talents in the US by Art in America in 1956.

Jegart created a mural of the Capitol Center for Tallahassee's original Municipal Airport which was dedicated April 23, 1961, a mural later re-created and exhibited at Tallahassee International Airport. She was also commissioned to paint a mural in Dodd Hall on FSU's campus. She primarily worked in oils and polymer using a collage style, Later in her life as she worked more on interiors she would often use local materials particularly seashells.

== Background ==
Jegart was born in Florida on July 18, 1927, to Paul H. Skevakis and Evelyn D. Skevakis. She had one older sibling, Mary Skevakis. "Artemis Skevakis", United States census, 1940; Saint Petersburg, Election Precinct 42, Pinellas, Florida, United States; roll T627, page 20B, line 68, enumeration district 52-46. Retrieved on 2020-07-20. She was married to sculptor Rudolf Jegart, and divorced in December 1967. The couple had two daughters: Rudi, born on July 11, 1959, and Nike, born on August 20, 1964.

She earned a Bachelor's and master's degree in art from Florida State University. Jegart married Riley Housewright on August 30, 1969, and moved with him to Frederick, Maryland. The couple were married for 34 years.

Jegart died in 2015.
