= Maggie Allesee National Center for Choreography =

The Maggie Allesee National Center for Choreography (MANCC), housed in Florida State University's Department of Dance, is a research center for dance.

== Conception and planning ==
The National Center for Choreography (NCC), which is now known as The Maggie Allesse National Center for Choreography (MANCC) was set in motion by Florida State University’s Dance Department administration and faculty in order to explore the definition of “research and development” within the field of dance, as well as to investigate the need within the national dance field to develop new models that support the creation of dance”.

In 2002, the President of FSU and the Dean of Visual Arts and Dance invited Libby Patenaude, former Chair of the Department of Dance, to begin searching for ways to initiate the creation of The National Center for Choreography (NCC), which would be associated with FSU, a Research I university.

Jennifer S.B Calienes, former Director of the National Dance Project (New England Foundation for the Arts) was hired as the Director.

After $17 million worth of renovations to the original 1920s gymnasium that housed FSU's original Department of Dance, and the National Center for Choreography in the works, Montgomery Gym was reopened in October 2004. FSU alumna Maggie Allesee endowed the choreographic center which was renamed as the Maggie Allesee National Center for Choreography (MANCC). “Maggie Allesee is a 1949 FSU graduate in English, journalism, and education, who now lives in Detroit. She was head cheerleader on the first FSU cheerleading squad, and the first woman to earn a varsity letter at Florida State”. Allesee's endowment assisted in making the plan of MANCC a reality.

== Sources ==
- Callahan, Suzanne. “History, Mission, and Core Values.” Maggie Allesee National Center for Choreography Position Paper. 2005–2006.
