= A. R. Meek =

Eighth Florida Attorney General

Almon Rouse Meek

8th Florida Attorney General
- In office July 1868 – 1870
- Governor: Harrison Reed
- Preceded by: James Westcott III
- Succeeded by: Sherman Conant

Personal details
- Born: 1834; Greenfield, Indiana, US
- Died: June 30, 1888 (aged 53–54); Jacksonville, Florida, US
- Political party: Republican
- Spouse: Eliza R. Rice (m. 1868; died 1869) Phoebe Caroline Piper (m. 1872)
- Education: Harvard University
- Occupation: Lawyer

Almon Rouse Meek (1834 – June 30, 1888), also referred to as Almon R. Meek and A. R. Meek, was an American lawyer and politician who served as the eighth Florida Attorney General.

== Early life and education ==
Meek was born in Greenfield, Indiana, in 1834. In 1857, Meek attended Harvard University, graduating the next year. He moved to Florida in 1868 and was admitted into the Florida Bar on April 9, 1868.

== Political career ==
Governor Harrison Reed, who like Meek was a Midwesterner who came to Florida after the American Civil War, appointed Meek as the eighth Florida Attorney General.

During Meek's tenure the Florida Senate attempted to impeach Reed twice. As a result of the first impeachment attempt, Lieutenant Governor William Henry Gleeson claimed the title of Governor of Florida. Meek, a supporter of Reed, sued Gleeson on behalf of the people of Florida. The trial, Florida v. Gleeson, went to the Florida Supreme Court, where many of the recent appointees were supporters of Reed and the Court ruled Gleeson's claim unconstitutional and removed him from office as Lieutenant Governor on December 14, 1868.

Meek resigned as Florida Attorney General in 1870 due to his health. He later served as a U.S. Court Commissioner and as the Chief Supervisor of Elections for the Northern District of Florida.

== Personal life ==
In 1868, Meek married Eliza R. Rice, a friend he met while at Harvard, though she died the next year. In 1872, he married Phoebe Caroline Piper, another old friend. He had no children with either wife.

== Death ==
Meek died on June 30, 1888, at his home in Jacksonville, Florida.
