= Robert M. Strozier =

American professor and President of Florida State University (1906–1960)

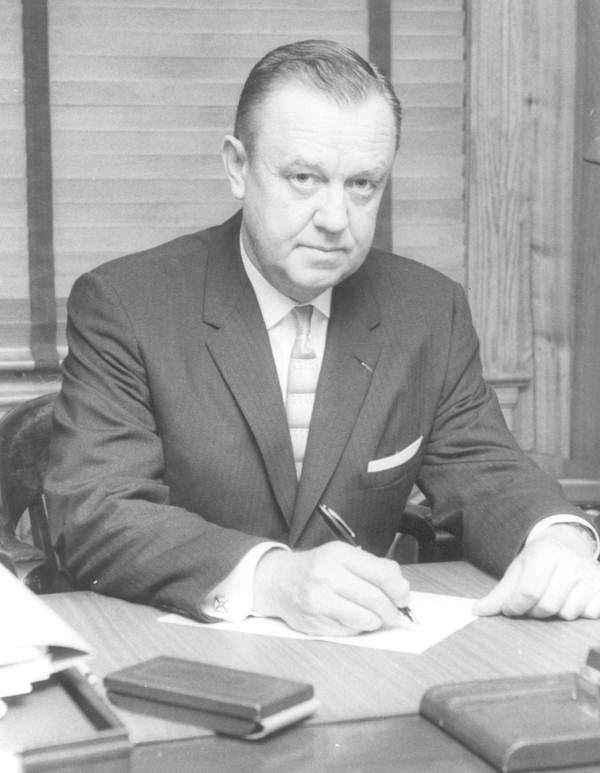
- Strozier c. 1957

6th President of Florida State University
- In office 1957–1960
- Preceded by: Albert B. Martin (acting President)
- Succeeded by: Milton W. Carothers (acting President)

Personal details
- Born: July 20, 1906 McRae, Georgia, United States
- Died: April 20, 1960 (aged 53) Chicago, Illinois, United States
- Spouse: Margaret Burnett (m. 1936)
- Children: 3
- Education: Emory University, University of Chicago, Sorbonne

Robert Manning Strozier (/stroʊˈʒɛər/; 20 July 1906 – 20 April 1960) was president of Florida State University between 1957 and 1960. The main library on the Tallahassee campus of Florida State University bears his name.

Strozier was born July 20, 1906, in McRae, Georgia and graduated from high school in Moultrie, Georgia.

He received a bachelor's and a master's degree from Emory University in 1930 and began his educational career on the faculty of Georgia College for Men at Tifton and was later on the faculties of West Georgia College and the University of Georgia.

Strozier did postgraduate work at the Sorbonne and at the University of Chicago, where he was awarded a PhD in 1945.

In 1936 he married Margaret Burnett. They had three children.

Following 1945, Strozier served as professor of romance languages and dean of students at the University of Chicago.

While Dean at the University of Chicago, Strozier was a member of the advisory council of the National Student Association.

On June 27, 1957, Strozier was nominated for the presidency of Florida State University.

Strozier's appointment was necessitated due to the retirement of Doak S. Campbell, who had come to FSU in 1941 for an annual salary of $6,000. Campbell's official duties as president ended on Monday, July 1, 1957, and Albert B. Martin, FSU Vice President served as Acting President until the Florida State Board of Education approved the appointment of Strozier to begin on September 1, 1957.

Strozier's starting salary as president of FSU was $17,500 a year which included an increase of $2,500 made that year.

Strozier returned to the University of Chicago and the Sorbonne as a lecturer on several occasions. While in Chicago for a speaking engagement, Strozier suffered a heart attack and died on April 20, 1960.

At Strozier's death, Milton W. Carothers became acting president to serve until Gordon Blackwell took over the duties of president on September 16, 1960.
