= James Westcott III =

American judge (1838–1887)

James Diament Westcott III
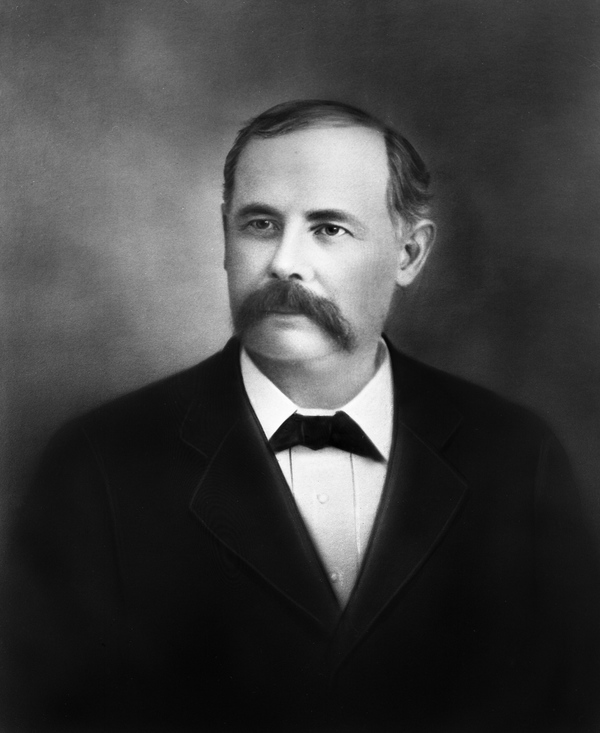

Justice of the Supreme Court of Florida
- In office July 1868 – January 1885
- Appointed by: Harrison Reed
- Preceded by: Samuel J. Douglas
- Succeeded by: George P. Raney

7th Florida Attorney General
- In office July 4, 1868 – July 1868
- Governor: Harrison Reed
- Preceded by: John B. Galbraith
- Succeeded by: A. R. Meek

Member of the Florida House of Representatives from the Leon district
- In office 1866–1866

Personal details
- Born: May 1, 1839 or June 18, 1839 Tallahassee, Florida Territory
- Died: April 29, 1887 (aged 47) Tallahassee, Florida, US
- Party: Democratic
- Education: West Florida Seminary

Military service
- Allegiance: Confederate States
- Branch/service: Confederate States Army
- Years of service: 1861–1864
- Rank: Captain
- Commands: 1st Florida Infantry Regiment; Magnolia Regiment
- Battles/wars: American Civil War

James Diament Westcott, III (May 1, 1838, or June 18, 1838 (Note: The Florida Bar Association and the official newsletter of the Florida court system both list Westcott's birthday as May 1, 1838 (references 3 and 6). However, his official biography on the website of the Florida Supreme Court lists his birthday as June 18, 1838 (reference 4)) – April 29, 1887), also known as James Diament Westcott, Jr., was an American politician from the state of Florida who served as the 19th justice of the Florida Supreme Court.

== Early life and education ==
Westcott was born in the city of Tallahassee in the Florida Territory on either May 1, 1838, or June 18, 1838. Westcott is the son of James Westcott, an early Florida politician who would later serve as its U.S. Senator. Although Westcott is the third in his family to share the name, he used the "Jr." suffix rather than the "III" suffix throughout his life.

Westcott studied at the West Florida Seminary.

== Political career ==
In 1858, Westcott became the assistant secretary of the Florida Senate. The following year, he became the private secretary of Governor Madison S. Perry.

During the American Civil War, Wescott served as an officer in the Confederate States Army, serving in the 1st Florida Infantry under the command of Brigadier General James Patton Anderson. Westcott served as Anderson's Commissary General and attained the rank of Captain. After his retirement from the Confederate States Army in 1864, Westcott served as the clerk of the C.S. District Court for Florida.

After the end of the war, Westcott was elected to the Florida House of Representatives, representing Leon County, in 1866, though he would resign later that year. In the 1868 elections, Westcott, a Democrat, successfully ran for Florida attorney general. This is despite the fact that both the 1868 Presidential election and 1868 Florida Governor election were both landslides for the Republican Party as a result of the 1868 Florida Constitution enfranchising freedmen, who mostly registered as Republicans. Additionally, many former Confederates, mostly Democrats, were still disenfranchised as part of Reconstruction.

=== Florida Supreme Court ===
Within a few weeks of assuming office as attorney general in July 1868, Westcott was appointed to the Florida Supreme Court by Republican Governor Harrison Reed, making him the youngest justice in the Court's history.

Despite their political differences, Reed saw potential in appointing Westcott to the Supreme Court. For one, it was important for Reed to appease the Southern Democrats by appointing one of their own to the Court, as it was filled with carpetbagger Republicans. Additionally, Westcott's friendly disposition on the one hand and thoroughness in researching the law and precedent on the other made him invaluable to the Court, and earned him respect from members of both parties. During his time on the Court, Westcott wrote 267 decisions, more than any other Justice up to that time except for Chief Justice Edwin M. Randall.

In 1872, incumbent Republican U.S. Senator Thomas W. Osborn did not run for re-election. Westcott ran to succeed him, receiving the Democratic nomination. However, Westcott lost in the general election to Republican Simon B. Conover as a result of the continuing Republican wave during Reconstruction.

Westcott continued to serve on the Florida Supreme Court until illness forced him to resign in 1885.

== Death and legacy ==
Westcott died in Tallahassee, Florida, on April 19, 1887, from the same illness that forced him to resign just two years earlier.

Westcott, a lifelong bachelor, left his entire estate to his Alma mater, the West Florida Seminary, which was struggling at the time. In part thanks to his contribution, the college survived to become Florida State University. In December 1936, Florida State University renamed the Administration Building to the James D. Westcott Jr. Memorial Building.

== See also ==
- James Westcott
- Westcott Building

== Notes ==
Legal offices
Preceded by John B. Galbraith	Florida Attorney General; 1868	Succeeded by A. R. Meek
