= Student Union (Florida State University) =

American university building

FSU Student Union
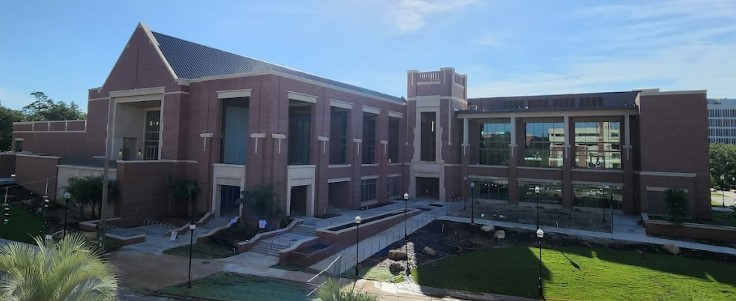
- Building NSU 4018
- Interactive map of the FSU Student Union area
- Former names: Oglesby Union

General information
- Type: Student center
- Architectural style: Collegiate Gothic
- Location: 75 North Woodward Avenue Tallahassee, Florida 32306
- Coordinates: 30.444504°N 84.29718°W
- Construction started: May, 2019
- Completed: April 29, 2022
- Inaugurated: September 23, 2022
- Cost: US$145,000,000

Technical details
- Material: brick
- Floor count: 4
- Floor area: 260,248 sq ft (24,177.8 m^{2})
- Lifts/elevators: 2

Design and construction
- Architect: Architects Lewis + Whitlock / Workshop Architects
- Main contractor: Ajax Building Group

Website
- FSU Student Union

The FSU Student Union is the student center on the campus of Florida State University in Tallahassee, Florida. The brick building is a modern structure with a collegiate gothic exterior, matching the architectural design of most buildings on the university's campus. It officially opened on September 23, 2022 replacing six aged buildings, some nearly 70 years old.

== History ==
=== 1940s-1950s-1960s ===
The Rowena Longmire Student-Alumnae building opened in 1940. Described as "the center of activities for student organizations"as well as recreation and social purposes for both students and faculty.

In 1952, the Student Center was completed and called, "the Alum". It had a jukebox, room for dancing and a snack bar. A few years later, the post office took over the space occupied by the dance floor.

The Student Center was greatly expanded in 1964 and named the "University Union" on November 14. The 130,000 sq ft (12,000 m^{2}) complex contained the "Davis Building", the "Moore Auditorium", the "Crenshaw Building", the "Activities Building", and the Olympic-sized "Union Pool". Facilities included dining rooms, meeting rooms, offices, lounges, a barbershop and beauty salon, a ticket office and game rooms.

=== 1970s-1980s-1990s ===
In 1974 the "University Union" complex was named for Ross R. Oglesby, Professor of Government and dean of students for ten years. He was instrumental in the 1964 Union expansion and remodel. At the 1975 dedication, he was identified as a key University Union planner and “a friend of students”. The Oglesby Union Board had jurisdiction over buildings that housed dozens of departments with one exception: the Union Post Office Building.

The state's Capital Improvement Trust Fund (CITF) provided $9 million to renovate and expand the "Oglesby Union" complex in 1988. The 96,150 sq ft (8,933 m^{2}) "Turner Building" was constructed and renovation of 60,000 sq ft (5,600 m^{2}) in the original complex was completed providing a computer lab, a Senate chamber, a video center, thirteen additional meeting rooms, six retail locations, an Art Center, twenty new offices and a video games arcade.

Another $3 million for an expansion/renovation project was received from the CITF in 1995, earmarked for the 1964 "Activities Building". The roof was replaced, water & sewer lines were relocated, and restrooms were modernized. Additional meeting rooms and offices were constructed.

The new Student Union contained a post office, a bookstore, a restaurant, study rooms, conference rooms, and rooms for student groups. Russell T. Pancoast & Associates designed the building. In 1964, the university expanded the Student Union with four more buildings: Student Activities, Crenshaw bowling alley, Moore Auditorium, and the Davis food service building. The Turner building was added to the Union Complex in 1988. Four of these buildings were demolished in 2018 to make way for the new Student Union.

=== 2000s-2010s ===
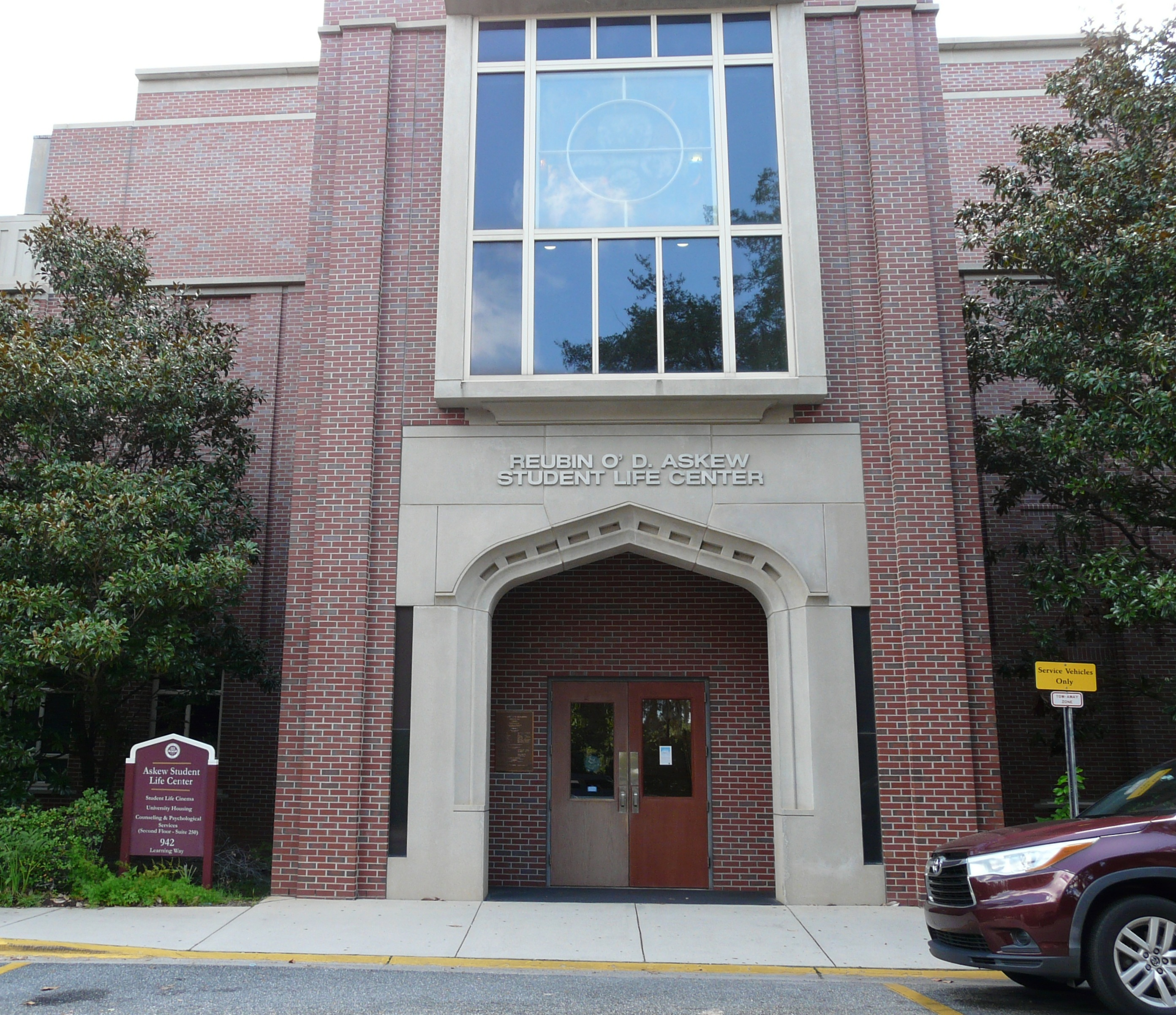
Aksew Student Life Center

The "Askew Student Life Center" (ASLC) was constructed in 2000 using $8.5 million in CITF funding. Named for Governor Reubin Askew in 2006. The ASLC included: a 380-seat multimedia theater; four 35-seat, business-quality meeting rooms; suites which provide office, meeting and workspace for: the Graduate Student Center, the Congress of Graduate Students, the National Pan-Hellenic Council (NPHC); offices for the University Housing Office and Student Counseling Center; a cyber café for computer gaming; and a dining facility for expanded on-campus food service.

A 2001 renovation of the Activity Building's third floor and the Ballrooms in the Turner Building was paid for by $2,458,350 in CITF money. Offices in the Activity building were enhanced with features to increase productivity and facilitate their use as a resource center. In the Ballrooms, new HVAC equipment was installed as well as a sound system, carpeting and cosmetic improvements.

A two-year renovation and landscaping of Union Green was completed in 2006. The greenspace, located east of the Oglesby Union, is used for special events.

Previously, the Oglesby Union was composed of six connected structures, with the oldest building originating in 1940. When the Oglesby Union was built in 1952, there were about 5,000 students; current enrollment is over 40,000. Part of the original Oglesby structure was incorporated into the new design; the remaining buildings were demolished in Spring of 2018. During initial planning, the estimated budget was $100 million. By the time bids were awarded, the cost for the new Union was $120 million with completion in the fall of 2020. Construction of the single facility was started just before the COVID-19 pandemic in the United States began. Multiple delays in acquiring material and labor pushed back the completion date by almost two years. While the new building was under construction, some of the activities offered at the old Oglesby were simply unavailable. Some students complained that no student union existed during their career at FSU.

On April 17, 2025, a mass shooting took place inside this building. 6 were injured, including the perpetrator, and 2 university employees were killed.

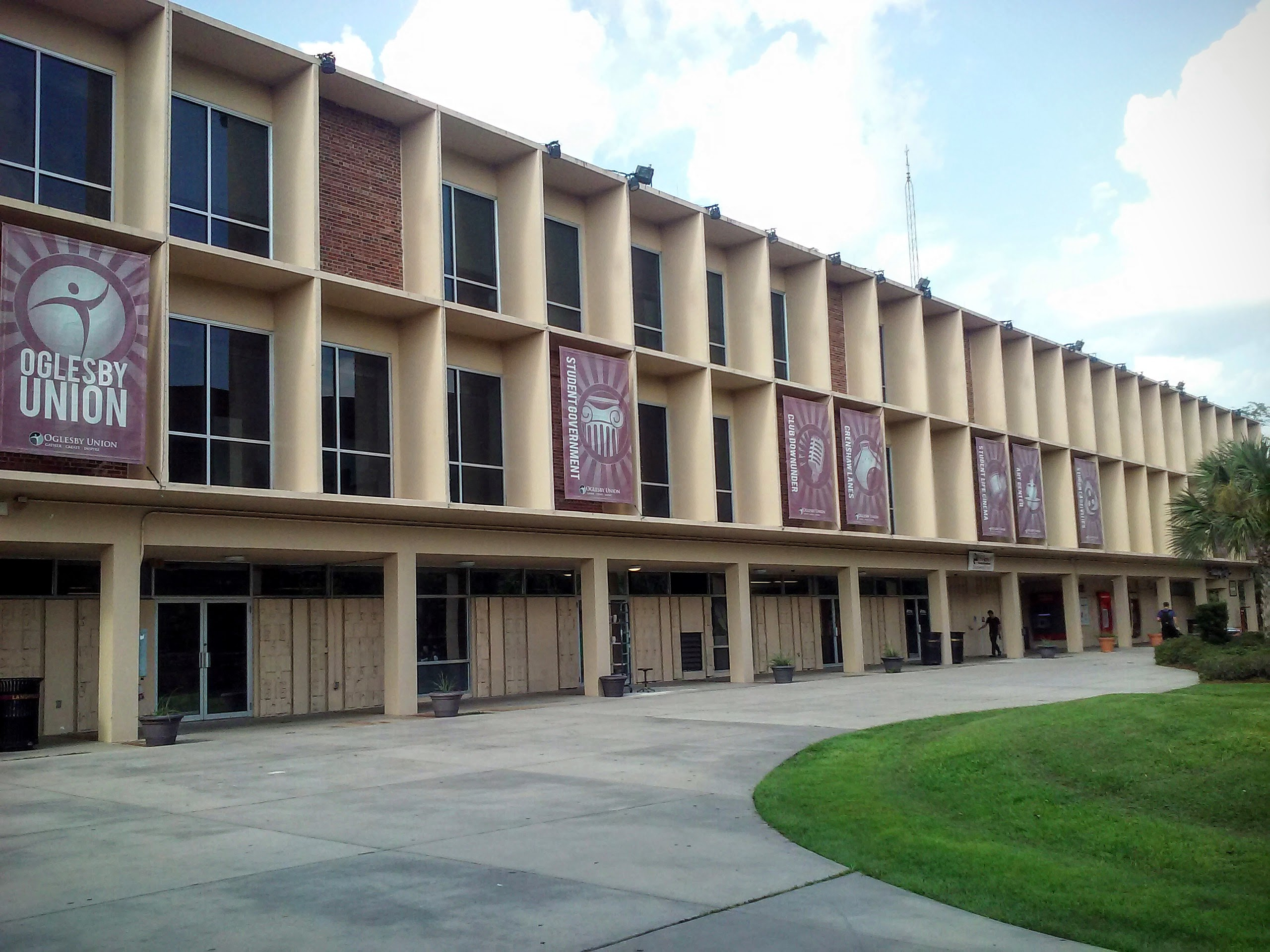
Oglesby Union, razed in 2018

== Tenants ==
Several organizations for students have offices on the third level of the Student Union; however, FSU has more than 750 Recognized Student Organizations (RSOs) on campus. The Student Union Activities Board and Student Organizations and Involvement Office provide services, resources, and help with events and programs that facilitate student engagement.

== Activities ==
Market Wednesday hosts sales by recognized student organizations, market vendors, and passersby. Vendor Thursdays allows people to showcase a product, service, or event to the FSU community.

The five ballrooms occupy 15,000 sq ft (1,400 m^{2}), or 1/3 acre. Lightweight "air walls" allow the space to be divided into five separate areas with 30' ceilings allowing events with 600+ guests.

== Post construction ==
- New Student Union Building (NSU-4018) active -260,248 sq. ft.
- Askew Student Life Center (ASK-0260) active – 60,944 sq. ft.
- Student Services Building (SSB-0379) active – 51,130 sq. ft.
- Moore Auditorium (MOR-0195) active - 12,536 sq. ft.
- Activities Building (ACT-0194) Demolished.
- Crenshaw Lanes (CRB-0193) Demolished.
- Davis Building (DAV-0196) Demolished.
- Turner Building (TUR-0051) Demolished.
- Oglesby Union (OGC-0195) Demolished.
- Post Office Building (UPO-0199) Demolished.

== Directors of the Student Union complex ==
The current (interim) Director is Dr. Justin Camputaro.

- 1964 – 1965 Dr. Reid Montgomery
- 1965 – 1968 Dr. Herb Reinhard
- 1968 – 1970 Paul Durrett
- 1970 – 1973 Roger Wehrle
- 1974 – 2003 Dr. Nancy Turner
- 2003 – 2006 Christopher Roby
- 2006 – 2015 William Clutter
- 2015 – 2022 Matthew Ducatt

== Formal dedication ==
The Student Union was formally dedicated on September 23, 2022. President McCullough thanked former President Thrasher and Provost McRorie for their foresight, calling the building, "transformative", with power to unite. Peter Collins, Chairman of the FSU Board of Trustees, was satisfied that despite being $20 million over budget and two years overdue, it was worth the wait.

== See also ==
- Florida State University
- History of Florida State University
