= Florida State University College of Education =

College of the Florida State University

College of Education, Health, and Human Science
- Type: Public
- Established: 1905
- Dean: Damon P. S. Andrew
- Students: 2,118
- Location: Tallahassee, Florida, U.S. 30°26′48.8″N 84°18′18.6″W
- Website: cehhs.fsu.edu

The Florida State University Anne Spencer Daves College of Education, Health, and Human Sciences, or Anne’s College, is one of sixteen colleges comprising the Florida State University (FSU). The College has roots that reach back to the West Florida Seminary and the State Normal College for Teachers. The College has a number of nationally ranked programs and is in the Top 20 nationally in terms of doctoral degrees awarded.

The College of Education, Health, and Human Sciences has six academic departments which offer undergraduate and graduate degree programs in 27 fields of study. The academic programs prepare students for positions as leaders in the classroom and school system environment, as well as those who conduct research to improve education, instruction and policy. Five online graduate degree program areas are available through the Distance Learning Program. The College operates the Florida State University School, a charter school in southeast Tallahassee.

== National rankings ==
U.S. News & World Report (2023 Edition)

- Overall College of Education - 26th overall
- Curriculum and Instruction - 23rd overall
- Education Administration and Supervision - 18th overall
- Higher Education Administration - 13th overall
- Special Education - 16th overall

In 2015, online graduate programs were ranked 2nd in the nation among both public and private universities by U.S. News & World Report.

== Department, schools, and programs ==
- Department of Family & Child Sciences
- Department of Nutrition, Food & Exercise Sciences
- Department of Retail, Merchandising & Product Development
- Center for Advancing Exercise and Nutrition Research on Aging (CAENRA)
- Family Institute
- Center on Better Health and Life for Underserved Populations (BHL Center)
- Center for Couple & Family Therapy
- Institute of Sports Sciences and Medicine
- Center for Retail Merchandising and Product Development
