= James Westcott =

American politician (1802–1880)

United States Senator from Florida
- In office July 1, 1845 – March 3, 1849
- Preceded by: none
- Succeeded by: Jackson Morton

Personal details
- Born: James Diament Westcott Jr. May 10, 1802 Alexandria, Virginia, US
- Died: January 19, 1880 (aged 77) Montreal, Quebec, Canada
- Party: Democratic

James Diament Westcott Jr. (May 10, 1802 – January 19, 1880) was an American politician of the Democratic Party who served as the first Class 3 United States senator from Florida from 1845 to 1849.

== Early life and career ==
Westcott was born in Alexandria, DC where his father, James Sr., was transitioning from newspaper publisher to politician. James Jr.'s grandfather was a captain in the American Revolutionary War. When Westcott was young, his family moved to New Jersey where his father established a political career in the Assembly and as Secretary of State of New Jersey from 1830 to 1840. James Jr. married Rebecca Bacon Sibley on August 7, 1821. He studied law and was admitted to the bar while still in his early 20s. In 1830, he moved to the Florida Territory and was appointed territory secretary by Andrew Jackson. His duties sometimes included performing the duties of the governor when the governor was away — all while barely 30 years old.

== Duel ==
In 1832, Westcott ran afoul of a short-tempered fellow lawyer and Kentucky native, Thomas Baltzell. Baltzell challenged Westcott to a duel and the two met near the Alabama border on September 25. When the gunfire was over, Westcott was injured but survived while Baltzell escaped unharmed and eventually became a Florida Supreme Court chief justice. The exact reason for the duel was not disclosed in official papers.

== Birth of a state ==
Westcott served as territory secretary and a member of the Florida Territorial Legislative Council until 1834 and then as Attorney General of the territory's middle district until 1836. He then returned to the legislature as part of the convention to create a U.S. state constitution. When the first Florida Constitution was completed in 1838, Westcott's signature was present (as was that of his former duel-mate, Thomas Baltzell). Seven years later, with the constitution approved, Florida was officially a state.

== Senate ==
When Florida was admitted to the Union in 1845, Westcott ran for U.S. senator and was victorious. Westcott and fellow Democrat David Levy (Yulee) became the first U.S. Senators from the new state of Florida. In a choice by lot, Westcott was named a Class III senator while Levy was named a Class I meaning Westcott drew the shorter term of four years.

While in the Senate, Westcott was the chairman on the Committee on Territories and the Committee on Patents and the Patent Office. He did not run for re-election in 1848.

In 2022, it was reported by the Washington Post that Westcott was one of more than 1800 members of the U.S. Congress who had been a slaveowner during his lifetime.

== Post-Senate ==
Westcott's only term ended in 1849 and, in 1850, he moved to New York City and practiced law there until 1862. In 1862, Westcott moved to Canada where he remained until his death in Montreal.

James Westcott's name remained in the Florida public eye as his son, commonly referred to as James Diament Westcott Jr., became a member of the Florida House of Representatives, and was Florida Attorney General and a Florida Supreme Court Justice as well as a Captain in the Confederate States Army — all before his untimely death at age 47. The younger Westcott left most of his estate to what is now Florida State University which, in turn, eventually named its main administration building in Tallahassee in his honor.

== See also ==
- List of United States senators from Florida
- Florida's congressional delegations

U.S. Senate
Preceded by (none)	U.S. senator (Class 3) from Florida; 1845–1849; Served alongside: David L. Yulee	Succeeded by Jackson Morton
