= Doak S. Campbell =

President of Florida State College for Women

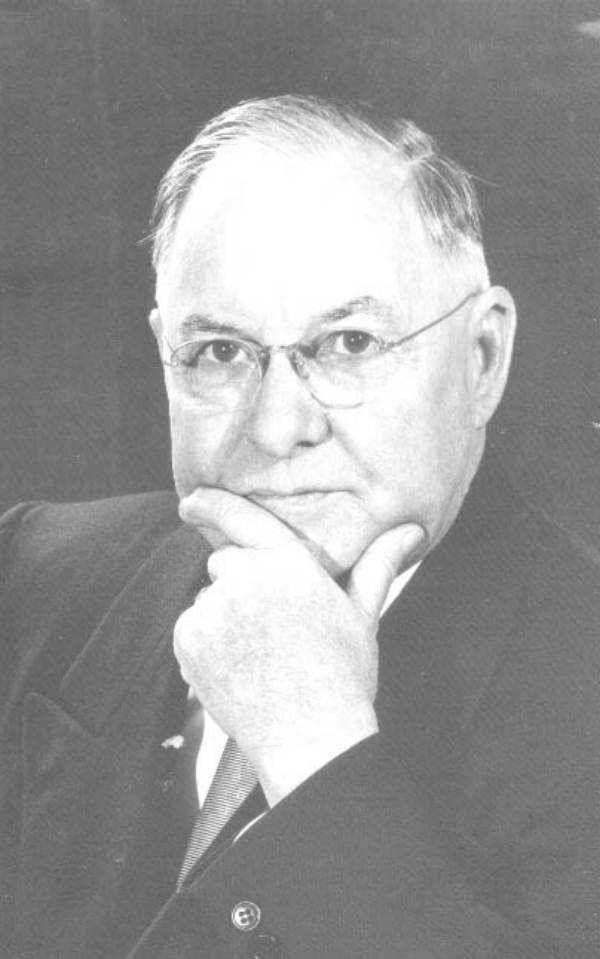

3rd President of Florida State College for Women 1st President of Florida State University
- In office 1941–1957
- Preceded by: Edward Conradi
- Succeeded by: Albert B. Martin

Personal details
- Born: November 16, 1888 Scott County, Arkansas, United States
- Died: March 23, 1973 (aged 84) Tallahassee, Florida, United States
- Spouse(s): Helen Gray Smith (1st), Edna Simmons (2nd)
- Children: Doak S. Campbell, Jr., and Elizabeth Caroline Campbell
- Education: Ouachita Baptist College and George Peabody College for Teachers
- Profession: Professor

Doak Sheridan Campbell (born 1888, died 1973) was from 1941 to 1957 president of Florida State College for Women and its successor coeducational school, Florida State University. He oversaw the creation of this new university. His opposition to the admission of African-American students has caused controversy about the naming of Doak S. Campbell Stadium in his honor.

== Early life ==
Campbell was born near Waldron, in Scott County, Arkansas, on November 16, 1888, the first of six children born to Edward and Elizabeth Campbell. He was named after his uncle, Samuel Doak.

Upon graduating from high school, he became a licensed teacher, but left after one year to attend Ouachita Baptist College in Arkadelphia, Arkansas. He was an intercollegiate debater, orator, and distance runner. He was president of his graduating class and obtained a Bachelor of Arts in music and speech in 1911.

== Family life ==
Doak Campbell was married to Helen Gray Smith from May 28, 1913, until her death in 1938. They had two children: Doak S. Campbell, Jr., (b. February 28, 1915; d. October 1, 2003) and Elizabeth Caroline Campbell (b. November 12, 1920; d. December 3, 2008).

Doak Campbell was married to Edna Simmons (1897–1978) from 1941 until his death in 1973.

== Career ==
Doak S. Campbell was Superintendent of the Columbus, Arkansas, State High School. In 1916, he began teaching chemistry at Central College for Women, a Baptist school in Conway, Arkansas. In 1920, he became president of the school. While serving in this role, Central College transformed from a four-year college to a two-year junior college (defunct since 1947).

Later in the 1920s, Campbell began attending George Peabody College for Teachers, receiving a master's degree in 1928 and a Ph.D. in 1930, at which time he was hired onto the school's faculty. He became dean of the graduate school at Peabody in 1938, and remained in that position until accepting the presidency of Florida State College for Women in September 1941. While at Peabody, Campbell was also a member of the Tennessee State Board of Education and the Board's Middle Tennessee Committee, and came under criticism for his handling of an academic freedom and tenure case in which a tenured teacher had been fired without stated cause.

A great boom in enrollment, driven by World War II veterans and the G.I. Bill, forced Florida to create new facilities for them. As a result, the Legislature changed Florida State College for Women to Florida State University effective May 15, 1947. The change from a women's college to a coeducational university in 1947 brought an expansion in staff, enrollment, and plant.

Campbell served as president of the Southern Association of Colleges and Schools. He also served as President of the Florida Baptist Convention, and was called an "outstanding Baptist layman". He was a sometime Sunday school teacher, and a frequent speaker before groups of religious leaders, such as the West Florida Baptist Pastors Conference.

== Position on "racial" integration ==
During Campbell's presidency, Florida came under increasing pressure to integrate its university system after the unanimous Brown v. Board of Education decision of 1954. At that time, only white students were admitted to Florida State or the University of Florida. Campbell has been described as strongly opposed to the admission of African-American students to Florida State. In 2020, Campbell's grandson defended him, arguing that "He was not promoting segregation. He was concerned about protecting the tranquility of the school." According to James Schnur, "Campbell exacted deference from the campus community, suppressed the liberal editorial policy of the semi-weekly Florida Flambeau newspaper, and refused to tolerate any breach of racial segregation. He forced the campus chapter of the American Association of University Professors (AAUP) to cancel a regional conference at FSU when he learned that black faculty members from the neighboring Florida Agricultural and Mechanical University (FAMU) planned to attend."

At the time, Tallahassee was racially uneasy because, following the successful Montgomery bus boycott of 1956 and the Supreme Court case Browder v. Gayle, local activists, including some students, boycotted Tallahassee buses seeking to integrate them as well. The Florida Board of Control, which ran the state's universities, warned students not to get involved in "the Tallahassee integration dispute". In an episode that was reported on nationally, Campbell had no hesitation in expelling a graduate student, John Boardman, who spoke "urging support of a Negro candidate for the Tallahassee City Commission against the white incumbent", and who invited three African students (not African-American) to an FSU party. Campbell required the student newspaper, the Florida Flambeau, to devote less space to integration. He went on record denying that he had said that there would eventually be Negro students at FSU. He expressed regret that Tallahassee Negroes seeking to end segregation were not meeting in juke joints, because it would have been easy to ban FSU students from them. But they met in churches, leaving Campbell "in a quandary over how to ban student support of integration".

Campbell retired from his position on June 30, 1957, but remained in Tallahassee as president emeritus of Florida State until his death on March 23, 1973.

== Legacy ==
Campbell supported a sports program at Florida State, and encouraged the construction of a football stadium. The stadium was completed in 1950, and named Doak S. Campbell Stadium in his honor.

In June 2020 there was a student petition to remove his name from the stadium because of his opposition to admitting black students, and to rename it for former coach Bobby Bowden. FSU President John Thrasher asked Athletics Director David Coburn "to immediately review this issue and make recommendations to me." As of February 2023 there has been no response.

Campbell donated all his papers, correspondence, etc. to Special Collections, Strozier Library (Florida State's main library), where they may be consulted.
