= Edward Conradi =

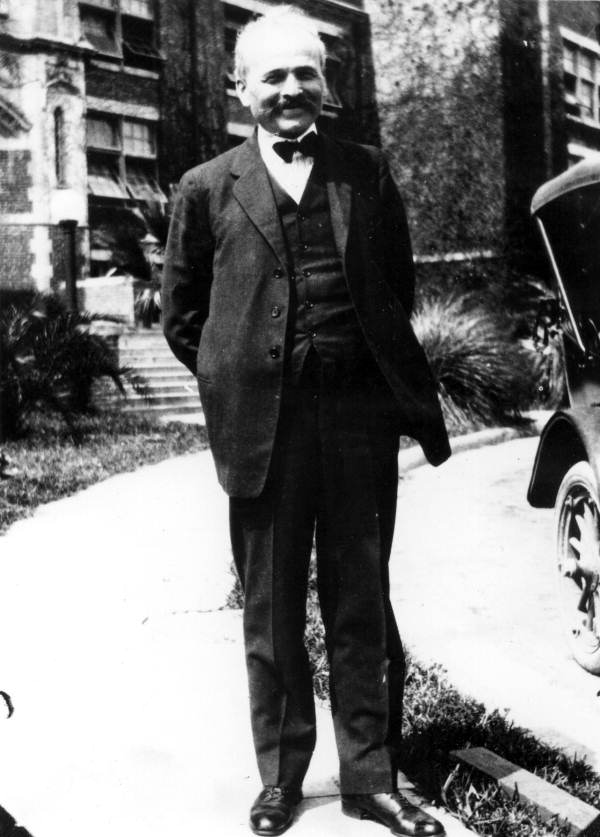

President of Florida State College for Women (now Florida State University)
- In office 1909–1941
- Preceded by: Albert A. Murphree
- Succeeded by: Doak S. Campbell

Personal details
- Born: February 20, 1869 New Bremen, Ohio, United States
- Died: December 1, 1944 (aged 75) Tallahassee, Florida, United States
- Education: Clark University
- Profession: Professor

Edward Conradi served as President of Florida State College for Women (now Florida State University) from 1909 to 1941, and as President Emeritus from 1941 until his death in 1944.

He was born on 20 February 1869 in New Bremen, Ohio. Conradi received bachelor's and master's degrees from Indiana University Bloomington, and completed a Ph.D. in psychology from Clark University in 1904.

He moved to Florida in 1905, where he was principal of the Normal and Industrial School of St. Petersburg, Florida until he was appointed Dean of the Florida State College for Women, in 1909, by that school's president, Albert A. Murphree. Conradi only briefly held that office, as Murphree soon became President of the University of Florida, and Edward Conradi was named to replace him at FSCW. Conradi died in Tallahassee, Florida on 1 December 1944.

The old biology building at FSU is named in his honor, as is an endowed chair at the Department of Psychology.
