= Francis W. Eppes =

American politician and planter

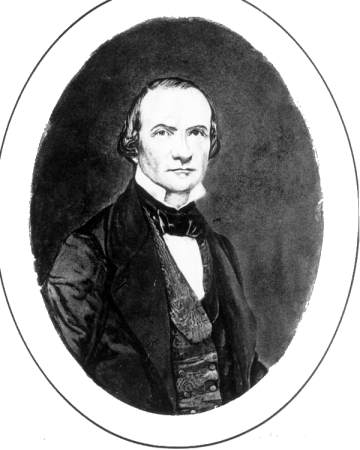

Intendant of Tallahassee, Florida
- In office 1841–1844
- Preceded by: Leslie A. Thompson
- Succeeded by: James A. Berthelot
- In office 1856–1857
- Preceded by: Thomas Hayward
- Succeeded by: D. P. Hogue
- In office 1866–1866
- Preceded by: P. T. Pearce
- Succeeded by: D. P. Hogue

Personal details
- Born: September 20, 1801 Monticello, Virginia, U.S.
- Died: May 30, 1881 (aged 79) Orlando, Florida, U.S.
- Spouses: Mary Elizabeth Cleland Randolph (m. 1822; died 1835) Susan Margaret Ware Crouch (m. 1837; died 1881)
- Children: 13
- Parent(s): John Wayles Eppes; Mary Jefferson Eppes
- Occupation: Politician

Francis Wayles Eppes (September 20, 1801 – May 30, 1881) was an American citizen from Virginia who became a cotton planter in the Territory of Florida and later served as a civic leader in Tallahassee and surrounding Leon County, Florida. After reaching legal age and marrying, Eppes operated the Poplar Forest plantation which his grandfather President Thomas Jefferson had established in Bedford County, Virginia, which he inherited. However, in 1829 he moved with his family to Tallahassee, Florida. Long interested in education, in 1856 Eppes donated land and money to designate a school in Tallahassee as one of the first two state-supported seminaries, now known as Florida State University. He served as president of its board of trustees for eight years.

== Early and family life ==
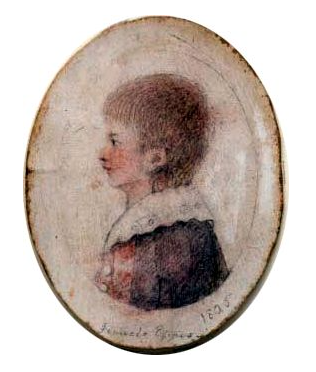
Francis Eppes as a boy

Francis Wayles Eppes was born in 1801, the second child of Maria (née Jefferson) and John Wayles Eppes, who would serve in the Virginia House of Delegates and both houses of the U.S. Congress. He was born at Monticello, his maternal grandfather's plantation in Albemarle County, Virginia. When he was born, his parents resided approximately 90 miles to the southeast at Mont Blanco plantation in Chesterfield County.

His mother died in 1804 when he was three, soon after the birth of her third child. Eppes was the only one of her three children to reach adulthood. Eppes' father soon moved his household and slaves from Mont Blanco, to another of his plantations, Millbrook, in Buckingham County, much closer to Monticello. Francis spent considerable time at Monticello with his maternal aunt Martha Randolph and his widower grandfather, Thomas Jefferson. At his father's Milbrook plantation, his chief caretaker was Betsy Hemmings, a slave whom he later called "Mam Bess." Jefferson had given her to Eppes' parents at their wedding. She was the daughter of Mary Hemings and the granddaughter of Betty Hemings, who was held by the Jeffersons at Monticello. Among his early nurses was Critta Hemings Bowles, an aunt of Betsy Hemmings, whom Eppes would purchase and manumit in 1827, after Jefferson's death (She had long been married to Zachariah Bowles, a free man of color).

Eppes studied law, but never completed his legal studies.

=== Marriage and family ===
After reaching the legal age of 21, on November 28, 1822, Francis married a distant cousin, Mary Elizabeth Cleland Randolph (January 16, 1801 – April 15, 1835), the daughter of Thomas Eston Randolph and his wife, Jane Cary (Randolph) Randolph. As discussed below, they initially lived at Jefferson's Poplar Forest plantation in Bedford County, Virginia. By 1828, when they moved to Florida, the couple had buried three children at the Jefferson family cemetery at Monticello, and both Jefferson and Eppes' father had died. Mary Randolph Eppes died in 1835, of complications following the birth of their sixth child.

Two years later, Eppes married Susan Margaret Ware Crouch (February 14, 1815 – September 1, 1887), the widowed daughter of U.S. Senator Nicholas Ware of Georgia. They had seven children together. With his two wives, Eppes was father to a total of thirteen children, but at least three died in childhood in Virginia.

== Career ==
Initially, Eppes operated the Poplar Forest plantation in Bedford County, Virginia, which his grandfather Thomas Jefferson had established and where he often lived in his later years. Jefferson had originally planned to give this plantation to his daughter Maria (Francis' mother), and after she died in April 1804, he designated it as his grandson Francis' inheritance. Poplar Forest became the only Jefferson property to pass to his intended heir. Jefferson's debts disrupted the rest of his bequests after his death in 1826. Moreover, Eppes found Poplar Forest isolated, and was ready to try his fortunes elsewhere.

Florida, then a territory, was being rapidly developed for cotton production. In 1829, Eppes moved with his family from Poplar Forest to Leon County, Florida, settling just east of Tallahassee. Such moves broke up both planters' and slaves' families. The Eppes took numerous slaves with them, among them grown descendants of Betsy Hemmings, who his father had given to Francis as a wedding present. He established the Francis Eppes Plantation in Leon County, Florida, raising cotton as a commodity crop by the use of extensive slave labor. In the antebellum period, cotton prices were high and there was extensive trade with England.

In Tallahassee, Eppes began 35 years of distinguished service to his new community. In 1833, Eppes was appointed one of fourteen justices of the peace for Leon County. Eppes first served as intendant (mayor) of Tallahassee from 1841 to 1844 and then again from 1856 to 1857. He first won election as the community grew concerned about lawlessness, particularly duels among leading men in territorial Florida. Florida Militia Brigadier General Leigh Read had recently been killed by Willis Alston, in a case attracting much attention. Read had earlier killed Willis' brother Augustus Alston in a duel. Eppes appointed six officers, who are considered the beginning of the Tallahassee Police Department.

Eppes also took an active interest in educational issues. He became a founding member of the Episcopal Church there. In 1838 Eppes was elected to serve as a Deputy to the Episcopal Church's General Convention, held that year in Philadelphia. Among its actions, the Convention officially admitted the Diocese of Florida. In 1851, the Florida Legislature authorized two seminaries of higher learning in Florida. One seminary was to be located west of the Suwannee River and one to the east of the river. In 1854, Eppes tried to gain approval for the western seminary to be located in Tallahassee, but was rejected.

In 1856, Eppes initiated the proposal again and offered to fund an initial endowment of $10,000, plus a $2,000 per year stipend and a new building. The legislature accepted the proposal. That year, the existing Florida Institute in Tallahassee was designated as the State Seminary West of the Suwannee River. Classes began in 1857. Eppes served on the seminary's board of trustees for eleven years; for the last eight of those years, he served as president of the board. The seminary later developed as Florida State University.

== Death, legacy and recent controversy ==
Eppes died on May 30, 1881, in Orlando, Florida, and was buried at Greenwood Cemetery. Three of his children by his first wife had died earlier in Virginia. They were buried at the Jefferson family cemetery at Monticello, as were Francis' Jefferson grandparents and mother, Maria. Later, at least three of his grandchildren were also buried there. Since the late 19th century, the cemetery has been owned and operated by the Monticello Association, a private lineage society of descendants of Jefferson and Martha Wayles. (This property is separate from the Monticello plantation, which is owned and operated by the Thomas Jefferson Foundation.)

In 1995, Florida State University established the Jefferson–Eppes Trophy to honor Eppes and his grandfather Thomas Jefferson. A statue of Eppes was installed to commemorate him at the university and unveiled in January 2002. In 2016, the Eppes statue was the subject of a non-binding removal referendum introduced by the FSU chapter of Students for a Democratic Society because Eppes owned slaves. The referendum failed by a vote of 71% to 29%. In May 2018, an FSU panel voted to recommended the removal of the statue as well as the Eppes designation at Eppes Hall. On July 20, 2018, maintenance crews removed the statue from Westcott Plaza. On May 12, 2019, the statue was relocated to another part of the campus. On July 24, 2020, the statue was removed from the campus. In 2021, FSU President John Thrasher accepted the recommendation from the Task Force on Anti-Racism, Equality, and Inclusion and directed that Eppes' name be removed from the building housing the College of Criminology and Criminal Justice.

== See also ==
- List of mayors of Tallahassee, Florida
- Plantations of Leon County, Florida
