= Mina Jo Powell Alumni Green =

Green at Florida State University, Florida, U.S.

Mina Jo Powell Alumni Green comprises a half-acre on the campus of Florida State University. The site encompasses a rich history, which includes the green as the original site for Florida A&M University, also located in Tallahassee, Florida. Mina Jo Powell graduated from Florida State University (alumna, BS 1950, MS 1963). FSU President Bernard Sliger dedicated the green in her name November 10, 1990. Until 1951, the Alumni Green, as it had been called for nearly a half-century, was the sole site for commencement ceremonies when FSU was called the Florida State College for Women. In 1946, the college's name changed to Florida State University and admission included men. After World War II, and with the influx of nearly ten times the number of students before the War, ceremonies shifted to the newly constructed Doak Campbell Stadium in 1951.

Mina Jo Powell is regarded as a relentless advocate and protector of green open spaces on FSU's campus.

== Memorial monument ==
In 2000, FSU's Student Government Association allocated $50,000 for a memorial monument that sits in the Mina Jo Powell Alumni Green. The monument signifies this green as a serene place to remember students who died while attending FSU. A Florida State University commemorative bench, dedicated to Mina Jo Powell, also sits in the green that bears her name.

Student Government monument
