= Sandy D'Alemberte =

American politician

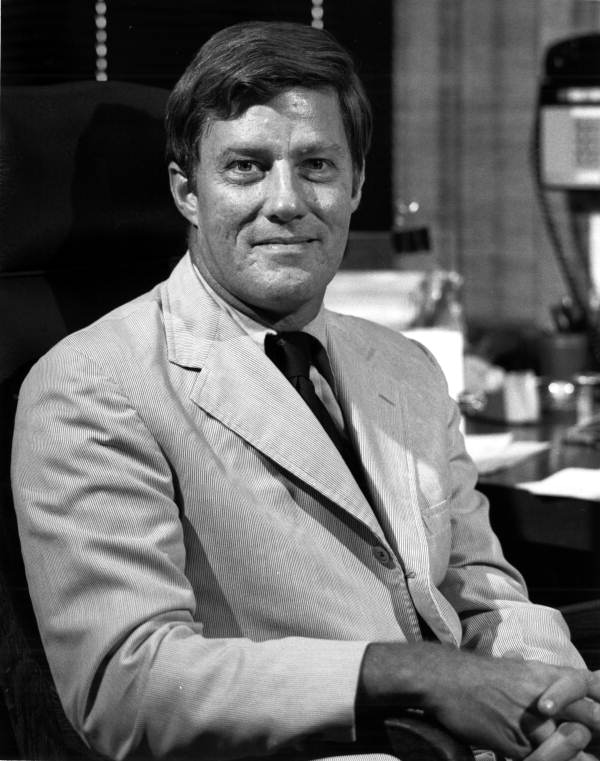

President of Florida State University
- In office 1994–2003
- Preceded by: Bernard F. Sliger (Interim)
- Succeeded by: T. K. Wetherell

President of the American Bar Association
- In office 1991–1992
- Preceded by: John J. Curtin
- Succeeded by: Glenn D. Warden

4th Dean of the FSU College of Law
- In office 1984–1989
- Preceded by: L. Orin Slagle
- Succeeded by: Sheldon F. Kurtz

Chair of the Florida Constitution Revision Commission
- In office 1977–1978
- Preceded by: Office created
- Succeeded by: Dexter Douglass

Member of the Florida House of Representatives
- In office November 8, 1966 – November 7, 1972
- Preceded by: Edmond Gong
- Succeeded by: Redistricted
- Constituency: Dade County, group 9 (1966–1967); 98th district (1967–1972)

Personal details
- Born: June 1, 1933 Tallahassee, Florida, U.S.
- Died: May 20, 2019 (aged 85) Tallahassee, Florida, U.S.

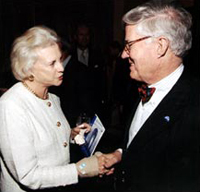
D'Alemberte with Sandra Day O'Connor (2001)

Talbot "Sandy" D'Alemberte (June 1, 1933 – May 20, 2019) was an American lawyer, professor, politician, educational administrator, president of the American Bar Association, and president of Florida State University (FSU), from 1994 to 2003.

== Early life ==
Born in Tallahassee, Florida, D'Alemberte was educated in public schools in Tallahassee and Chattahoochee, Florida. In 1955, he earned his Bachelor of Arts degree in political science with honors from the University of the South in Sewanee, Tennessee and also attended summer school at Florida State University and the University of Virginia. After military service as a lieutenant in the United States Navy Reserve, D'Alemberte studied on a Rotary Foundation fellowship at the London School of Economics. In 1962, he received his juris doctor with honors from the University of Florida where he was named to the Order of the Coif, served as president of the Student Bar Association, was captain of the moot court team, served as articles editor of the University of Florida Law Review, and received the J. Hillis Miller Award as the outstanding law graduate.

== Legal and political achievements ==
In 1975, while in private practice, he petitioned the Supreme Court of Florida to allow video cameras into courts in Florida. It took four years, but the Supreme Court granted the petition on April 12, 1979. Florida thus became the first state to regularly allow television coverage of civil and criminal trials.

D'Alemberte was the President of the American Bar Association from 1991 to 1992. During his tenure, he and colleague Homer Moyer, helped to create the ABA's program that aided the newly Democratic nations of eastern Europe, called CEELI. The Central European and Eurasian Law Initiative (CEELI), oversees the ABA’s democracy building programs in over 21 countries and has programs which promote development of fair and open election laws. It was created to assist former Soviet states build democratic institutions. Former US Supreme Court Justice Sandra Day O'Connor once stated that she thought that CEELI was the most crucial of D'Alemberte's contributions to the world.

D'Alemberte served as the president of the American Judicature Society from 1982 to 1984, then again from 2005 - 2007. He represented Dade County in the Florida House of Representatives from 1966 to 1972 as a Democrat and chaired several legislative committees. He received the award for "Outstanding First Term Member". In 1972 he also recognition as "Outstanding member of the Florida House" After leaving the Florida Legislature, he chaired the Florida Constitution Revision Commission in 1977-1978 and the Florida Commission on Ethics in 1974-1975.

== Career at Florida State University ==
D'Alemberte's grandfather attended the Seminary West of the Suwannee and his mother attended the Florida State College for Women; two of the earlier names of Florida State University. D'Alemberte served as the fourth dean of the Florida State University College of Law from 1984 to 1989. On November 29, 1993, he was appointed president of Florida State University by then Governor Lawton Chiles, and took office on January 3, 1994, which he held until January 6, 2003 when he was succeeded by Dr. T. K. Wetherell.

== Later years ==
D'Alemberte joined the law firm of Hunton & Williams in 2004, where he focused on appellate and trial work. He retired from the firm in 2008. He continued teaching as a member of the University faculty at the FSU College of Law as well as having a private appellate practice in Tallahassee, D'Alemberte & Palmer, PA. He handled all kinds of appellate work, including mediation about water rights, university investigations and human trafficking.

D'Alemberte was an active member of many legal and higher educational committees and boards, including numerous American Bar Association committees, state and regional bar associations, the American College of Trial Lawyers, the Lawyers' Committee on Civil Rights Under Law, the NAACP Legal Defense and Education Fund, the Florida Council of 100, the Business-Higher Education Forum, the Campus Compact, the Advisory Board of the First Amendment Center at Vanderbilt University, the Mildred and Claude Pepper Foundation Board of Directors, the Academic Task Force on Hurricane Catastrophe Insurance which identifies ways to provide affordable hurricane insurance coverage to all Floridians, and several FSU committees and boards including the FSU Foundation, the FSU Alumni Association, the Collins Center for Public Policy, the Caribbean Law Institute and the Seminole Boosters.

== Death ==
D'Alemberte died suddenly on the afternoon of May 20, 2019. He was a partner of D'Alemberte & Palmer, a Tallahassee firm specializing in appellate work. He is survived by his wife, Patsy Palmer, and two children.

== See also ==
- List of Florida State University people
- List of presidents of Florida State University
