= Ginger Wetherell =

American politician

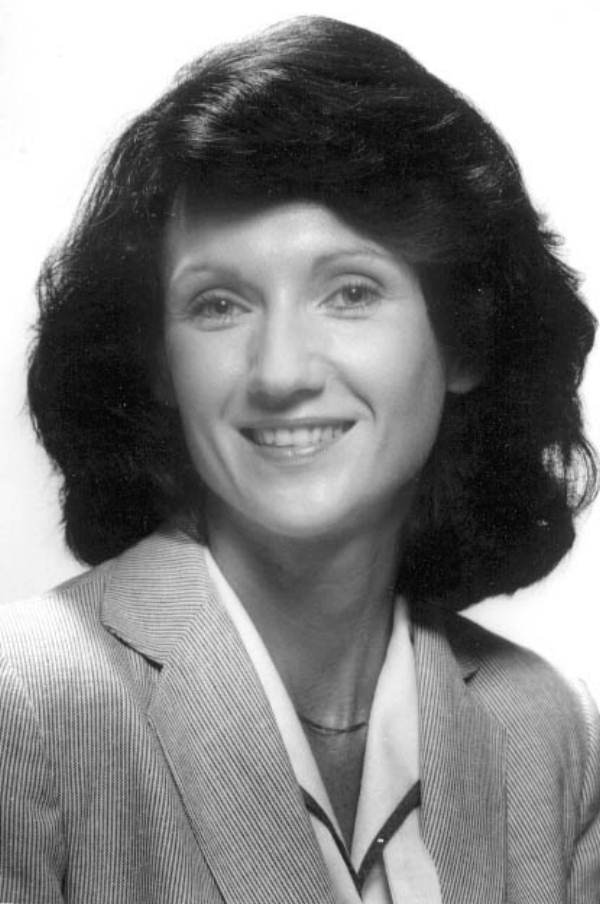

1st Secretary of Florida Department of Environmental Protection
- In office November, 1991 – November, 1998
- Governor: Lawton Chiles
- Preceded by: New agency
- Succeeded by: David B. Struhs

Member of the Florida House of Representatives from the 2nd district
- In office November 2, 1982 – November 8, 1988
- Preceded by: Tom Patterson
- Succeeded by: Buzz Ritchie

Personal details
- Born: Mary Virginia Bacon; May 15, 1947 (age 79) Anniston, Alabama, U.S.
- Party: Democratic
- Spouse: Mike Bass (m. 1973; div. 1987) T. K. Wetherell (m. 1988; died 2018) James A. "Jim" Scott (m. 2020)
- Children: Blakely, Page (Mike Bass), Kent (former stepson, T. K. Wetherell), Stacy and Frank (stepchildren, James A. "Jim" Scott)
- Education: Auburn University (BS); Jacksonville State University (MS)
- Awards: President's house honor 2019; FSU Torch Award 2022

Virginia Bass "Ginger" Wetherell (born May 15, 1947) is an American businesswoman and politician. She was a member of the Florida House of Representatives for the 2nd district between 1982 and 1988, then the first Secretary of the Florida Department of Environmental Protection from 1991-1998.

== Biography ==
=== Early life ===
Wetherell was born in Anniston, Alabama and graduated from Anniston High School in 1965. She received her bachelor's degree in biological science and psychology from Auburn University in August 1968 and taught at Anniston High School prior to a brief unsuccessful marriage. She went back to school and earned a master's degree in counseling from Jacksonville State University in 1972.

=== Family life ===
Wetherell married again in 1973 and two girls were born to the couple. She worked with the Bass family businesses in Pensacola throughout the 1970s which included a Pepsi bottling company, a truck freight company, a mortgage investment company and a food & beverage vending company, which she started. All the businesses were put up for sale by her husband in 1981 and she decided to enter politics before they sold in 1984.

=== Government life ===
She campaigned for the Florida House in 1982 as a Democrat and was the first woman elected from northwest Florida. She was reelected twice, serving from November 2, 1982, to November 8, 1988. She divorced Bass during her third term in office and married T. K. Wetherell in 1988. After leaving the Florida House, she was hired as Deputy Director of the Florida Department of Natural Resources, a position she held until 1991 when she was appointed by Governor Lawton Chiles as Secretary of the new Florida Department of Environmental Protection. FDEP was created by the merger of the Florida Department of Natural Resources and the Florida Department of Environmental Regulation. The FDEP employs over 3,000 professionals and has a budget exceeding $1 billion. For professional development, Wetherell attended the John F. Kennedy School of Government at Harvard University in 1997. She left the FDEP in 1998.

Oak Hill Plantation House

=== Oak Hill ===
While serving in the Florida House, T. K. Wetherell began purchasing parcels of land in the Red Hills Region of Jefferson County, Florida that would become the 983-acre Oak Hill Plantation. The property is near Lamont, an unincorporated community and census-designated place (CDP) 30 miles east of Tallahassee. Following her wedding to TK in 1988, they began planning to build a home on the property.

Design inspiration for the home came from the historic Asa May house in nearby Capps, Florida. Architectural elements from historic buildings being demolished, or purchased at auctions were incorporated into the plans. Tallahassee's Old Floridan Hotel was the source of four huge 19th-century windows that were placed at the ends of the main hallways on each side of the first floor. The ceilings are thirteen-feet tall to frame the jumbo windows. The staircase off the grand foyer used pine from the Old Ormond Hotel which opened in 1888 and was built by Henry Flagler. Other historic elements from the Ormond Hotel include fireplace mantels, doorknobs, and other hardware. Flooring throughout the house is heart-of-pine. Construction on a two-story Plantation house was begun in 1990 and completed the following year.

There are formal living and dining rooms, a library with a comfortable reading area, a parlor with a wet bar, a chef's kitchen outfitted with high-end appliances and an informal dining area; a separate caterer’s kitchen; a butler’s pantry, an office, a Home cinema featuring pediments and light fixtures once in the old Florida Capital building, and a screened porch overlooking the landscaped backyard. The second-floor porch has a view of the lake.

A Conservation easement was established in 2012 with Tall Timbers Research Station and Land Conservancy to drastically lower the yearly property tax bill. The easement prohibits subdivision and development but allows changes for recreational use.

=== FSU new residence ===
John E. Thrasher was chairman of the FSU Board of Trustees when her husband was inducted as President of Florida State University in January, 2003. Thrasher gave the FSU First Lady a challenge: plan and oversee construction of a new President's residence and secure private funding for the project. Mrs. Wetherell was well qualified for the job. She understood that the project would be a lasting legacy and devoted countless hours researching, planning and monitoring the construction. Her passion for the job “consumed” her for two years.

After reviewing work done by Historical Concepts Architecture & Planning Company in Atlanta, Mrs. Wetherell chose them and Aaron Dailey as primary architect for the project, and Skip Sheffield, who built the Wetherell's Oak Hill Plantation, was chosen as contractor. She received assistance from FSU's Master Craftsman Program to create most of the extensive moldings, and the heart-of-pine flooring in the Event Room had been saved from the Montgomery Gymnasium (now the Montgomery Building). She also solicited everyone for antiques, period furniture and mementos for the house’s aesthetic and authenticity.

When the painters did not show up, she painted and enlisted volunteers to help meet deadlines. She also laid paving bricks to enhance the exterior. The house opened in August 2007 and to this day, it is known affectionately as “The House that Ginger Built”.

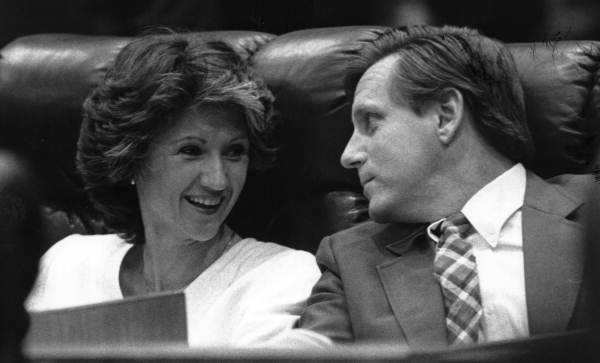
Ginger & TK in the Legislature

=== TK's decline & death ===
T.K. Wetherell had been seeing physicians at the Mayo Clinic in Jacksonville for several years, but in 2009 his doctors referred him to M.D. Anderson Cancer Center. Ms. Wetherell accompanied him to the facility in Houston and they returned every three weeks for more treatments. However, his cancer battle began to take more and more of his time.

When T.K. decided he could no longer perform at the level demanded by the president's job, he tendered his resignation and stepped down on January 31, 2010. He and Ginger moved out of the president's house and returned to Oak Hill Plantation.

After his 2002 cancer diagnosis and 16 years of treatment, T.K. died from complications due to cancer on December 16, 2018, six days before his 73rd birthday.

=== Awards ===
In November 2019 Virginia Wetherell was honored by FSU President John Thrasher for her work on the President’s House. A plaque was unveiled honoring FSU's former First Lady for her dedication to the project. The plaque will remain in the house for perpetuity. It was the first time she had returned to the house since she and former FSU President Wetherell left in 2010. Mrs. Wetherell commented, “I’m just flooded with memories today, walking up the steps and seeing how the trees have grown that we transplanted here, seeing the house in such perfect condition. It still looks perfectly new, fresh and beautiful. I’m thrilled.”

She was also honored in March, 2022 with FSU's Torch Award.

=== New life ===
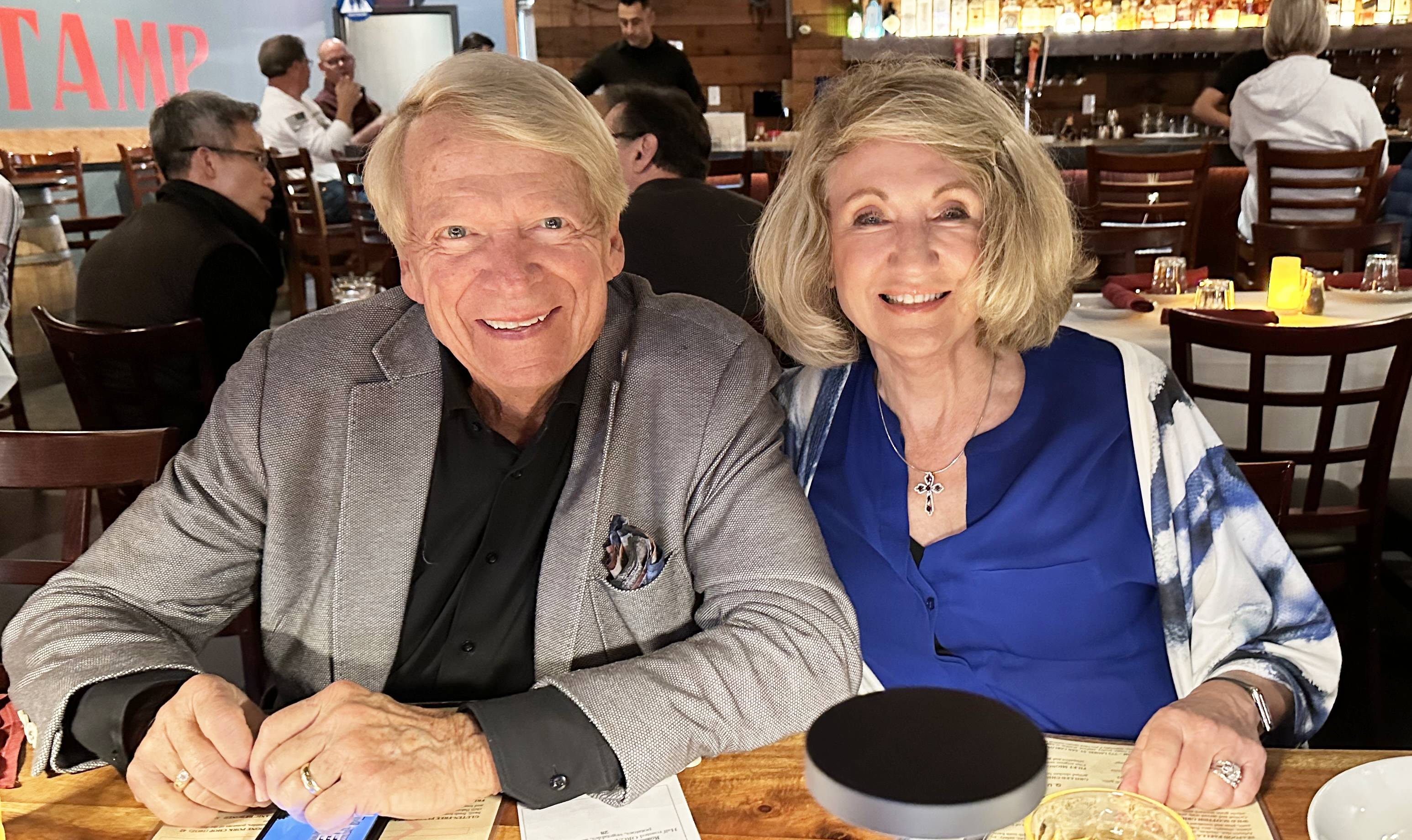
Wetherell-Scott with Jim Scott at a restaurant in San Carlos, California

James A. "Jim" Scott was good friends with T. K. Wetherell and the two often went bird hunting when they were in the Florida legislature. Unable to attend T.K.'s funeral, he phoned Ginger to express his condolences. They began seeing each other during the summer of 2019 and the relationship "just blossomed", according to Scott. Ms. Wetherell-Scott stated, “Life is full of surprises. It’s a pleasant surprise at our age.’’ Wetherell and Scott were married in 2020. As of 2023, the Scotts live between Oak Hill Plantation, Lauderdale-By-The-Sea, Florida and Waynesville, North Carolina. Jim Scott also owns a 600-acre ranch in Holmes County, Florida. Their plans include spending time at each location.
