= Oak Hill Plantation =

Conservation preserve in North Florida

- Plantation logo
- Interactive map of the Oak Hill Plantation area

General information
- Type: Residence & Hospitality
- Architectural style: Greek Revival architecture
- Location: 2888 E Capps Hwy, Lamont, Florida 32336
- Coordinates: 30.3911°N 83.8654°W
- Completed: 1991

Technical details
- Floor count: 2
- Floor area: 13,068

Design and construction
- Main contractor: Skip Sheffield

Oak Hill Plantation is a privately owned conservation preserve created in the late 20th century by T. K. Wetherell with his wife, Ginger Wetherell. The large personal residence is maintained by the present owner, Ginger Wetherell-Scott.

== Origins ==
While serving in the Florida House of Representatives, T. K. Wetherell began purchasing parcels of land in the Red Hills Region of Jefferson County, Florida that would become the 983-acre Oak Hill Plantation. The property is near Lamont, 30 miles from Tallahassee, Florida. The house is 8,000 ft² and contains five-bedrooms and four-bathrooms in the classic Greek Revival-style architecture that was typical for plantation homes. The property is almost surrounded by Ted Turner's 32,000-acre Avalon plantation. A paved driveway lined with live oaks leads to the house, about a 10-minute drive to Interstate 10. The heavily treed, rolling hills surrounding the compound are a diverse habitat for wildlife including whitetail deer, turkeys, quail and doves. The 15-acre lake is fed by a natural spring. The old St. Augustine Road passes through the property and is one of many walking, riding and horse trails.

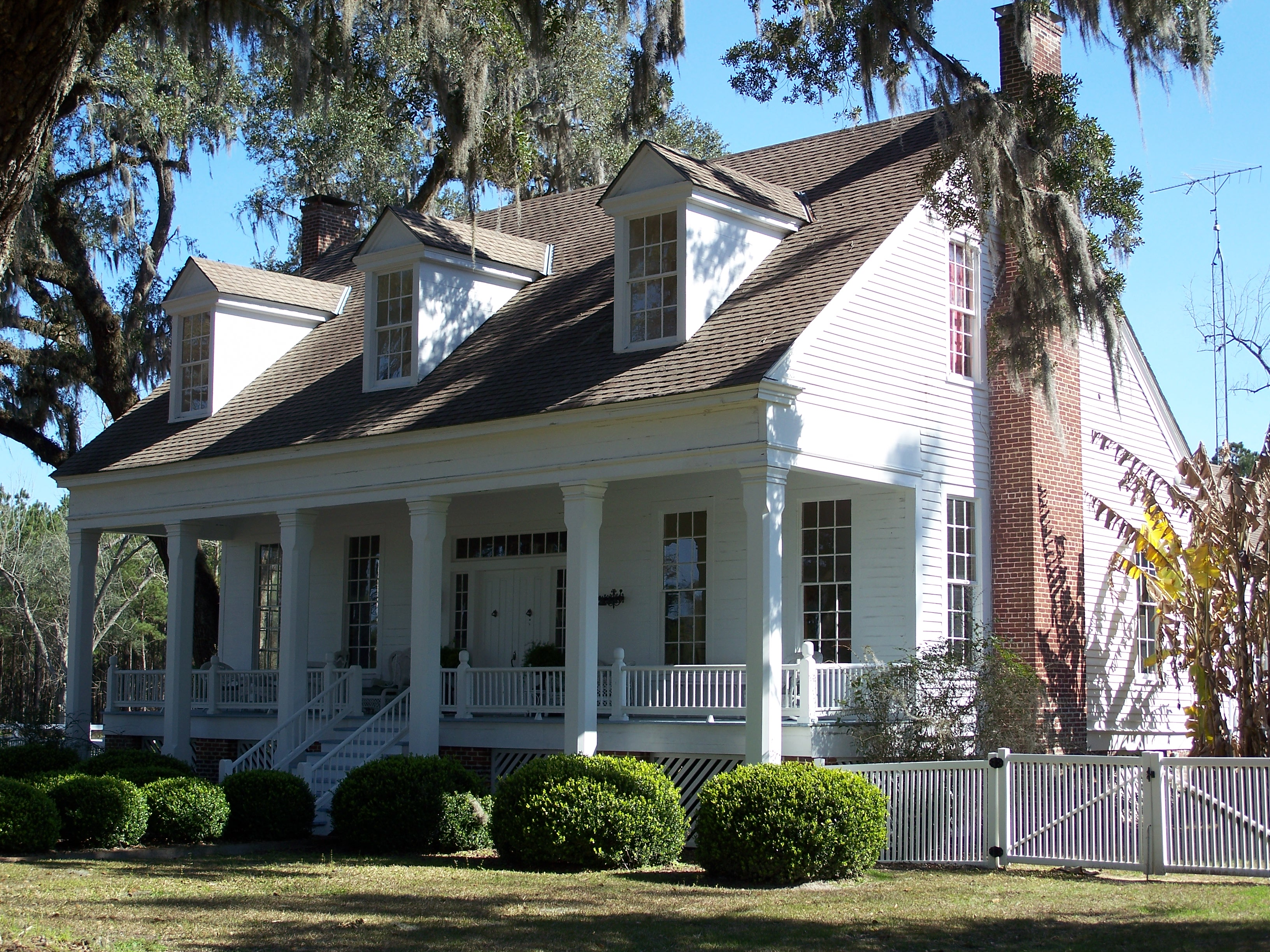
Asa May House

== The house ==
Following TK's marriage to Ginger Bass in 1988, they began planning to build. The design inspiration for the home came from the historic Asa May house in Capps, Florida. Architectural elements from historic buildings being demolished or purchased at auctions were incorporated into the plans. Tallahassee's Old Floridan Hotel was the source of doors and four huge 19th-century windows that were placed at the ends of the main hallways on each side of the first floor. The ceilings are thirteen-feet tall to frame the jumbo windows.

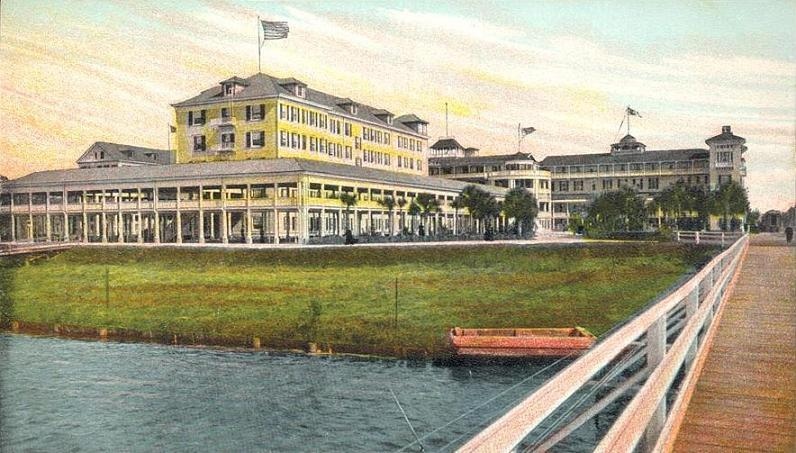
Old Ormond Hotel c. 1905

The staircase off the grand foyer used pine from the Old Ormond Hotel which opened in 1888 and was built by Henry Flagler. Other historic elements from the Ormond Hotel include fireplace mantels, doorknobs, and other hardware. Flooring throughout the house is heart-of-pine. The two-story home was begun in 1990 and completed the following year. There are formal living and dining rooms, a library with a comfortable reading area, a parlor with a wet bar, a chef's kitchen outfitted with high-end appliances plus an informal dining area; a separate caterer’s kitchen; a butler’s pantry, an office, a Home cinema featuring pediments and light fixtures once in the old Florida Capital building, and a screened porch overlooking the landscaped backyard. The second-floor porch has a view of the lake.

Oak Hill Plantation House

== Other areas ==
The yard features a brick courtyard with a fountain and a gazebo. A separate 1,600-square-foot house was originally intended for guests but the maintenance staff resides there now. A three-car garage was built to resemble a carriage & tack house; a "gathering lodge" contains small living quarters, a workshop and equipment barn with three bays; a skeet-shooting area; an office/man cave; and a cooking shack for entertaining outside at the lodge.

== Usage ==
The house was completed prior to TK's last year in the legislature and was used extensively for entertaining politicians, government officials and corporate executives, as well as friends and family from 1991 until the Wetherells moved into the president's house at FSU in 2007.

== Give, sell or keep ==
The Wetherells moved from Tallahassee to Oak Hill after their last child left home. In October 2003 the Wetherells announced the donation of Oak Hill Plantation to FSU after their deaths. After Wetherell resigned as FSU's president in 2010, the couple moved back to Oak Hill. In 2012 or 2013 TK changed his will to leave Oak Hill to his wife. About the same time, a Conservation easement was established with Tall Timbers Research Station and Land Conservancy to drastically lower the yearly property tax bill. The easement prohibits subdivision and development but allows changes for recreational use. Real estate agents in 2017 said the easement was worth approximately $10 million. Ginger Wetherell stated in early 2018 that they had gotten older and the time had come to move on. It could take years to sell, but they weren't in a hurry to leave. After touring the property, one real estate broker called the property "remarkable" due to the number of "Ecotones, habitat types, ground cover, timber diversity, water, and game flow" on less than 1,000 acres. Oak Hill Plantation was listed for $10.7 million (~$13.1 million in 2024), but TK Wetherell died in late December 2018 from complications of cancer. Oak Hill was withdrawn from sale and Mrs. Wetherell continued to live there.

Mrs. Wetherell married James A. Scott in 2020. Scott was good friends with T. K. Wetherell and the two often went bird hunting when they were both in the Florida legislature. She changed her name to Wetherell-Scott and her new husband moved to Oak Hill where they resided as of 2023.
