= List of presidents of Florida State University =

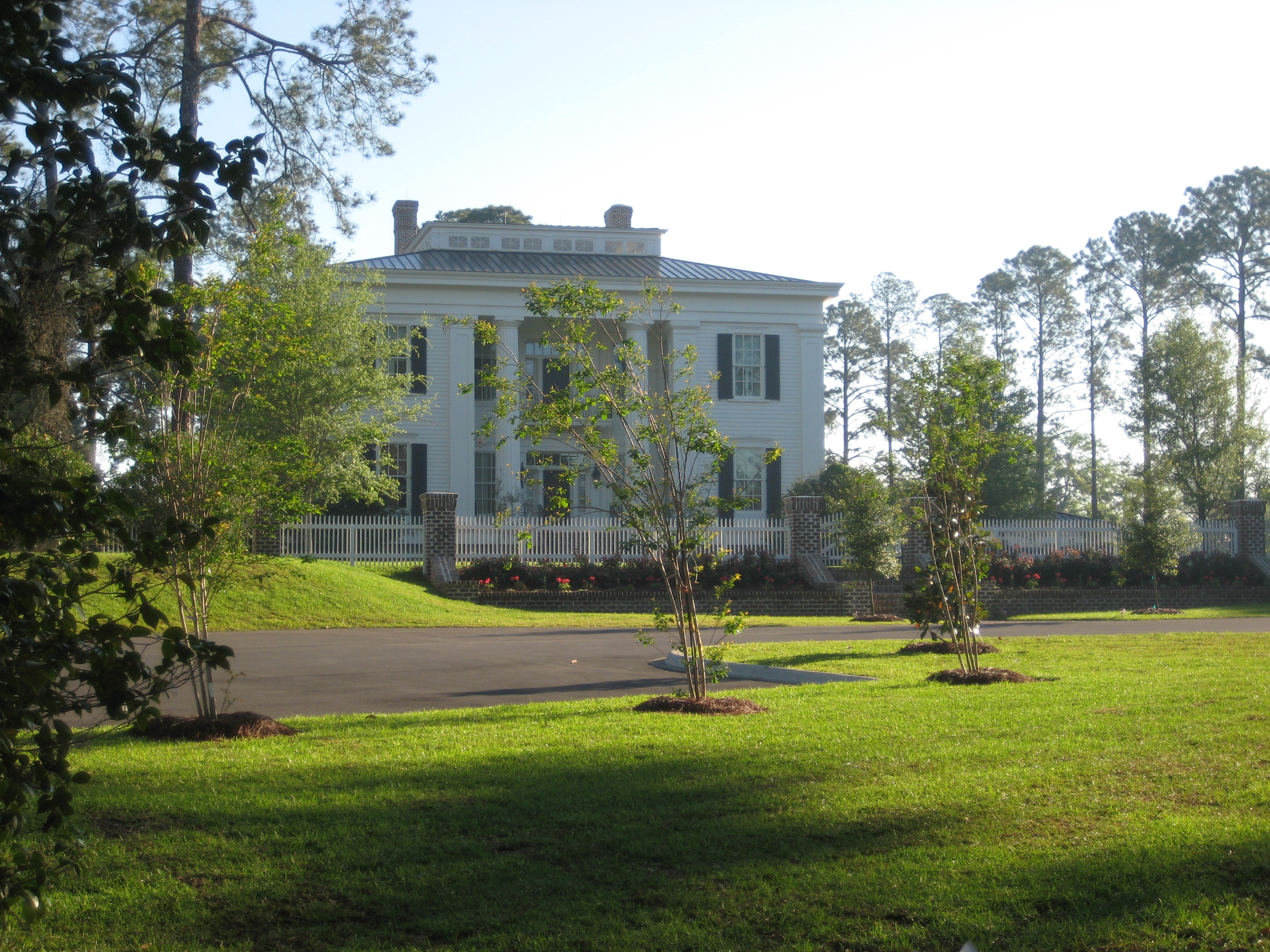
The President's House at FSU

The president of Florida State University is the executive officer of the Florida State University Board of Trustees, and essentially, the leader of the university. Florida State's campus is in Tallahassee, Florida, the state capitol. Although the institution was officially founded on January 24, 1851, it became the state's first Liberal Arts College in 1897.

The school's name did not reach the present form until 1945, going through a number of different names between 1851 and 1945. From 1857 to 1887, the school's leader was given the title of "Principal".

== List of presidents ==
| Term | President | Background and accomplishments |
|---|---|---|
| First; 1887–92 | | George Edgar |
| Second; 1892–97 | | Alvin Lewis |
| Third; 1897–09 | | Albert A. Murphree |
| Fourth; 1909–41 | | Edward Conradi |
| Fifth; 1941–57 | | Doak S. Campbell |
| Interim; 1957 | | Albert B. Martin |
| Sixth; 1957–60 | | Robert M. Strozier |
| Interim; 1960 | | Milton W. Carothers |
| Seventh; 1960–65 | | Gordon W. Blackwell Resigned as FSU President in 1965 after five years to become President of Furman University. |
| Eighth; 1965–69 | | John E. Champion Resigned as FSU President at age 47 in 1969 after 4 years; returned to teaching Business for 15 years as Professor Emeritus. |
| Ninth; 1969–76 | | J. Stanley Marshall Resigned in 1976 at age 53 after 7 years as FSU President; Security Company president for 10 years, then founded James Madison Institute. |
| Tenth; 1976–91 | | Bernard F. Sliger Retired as FSU President after 15 years at age 67; remained a presence at FSU for many years. |
| Eleventh; 1991–94 | | Dale W. Lick was FSU President less than three years, leaving after losing support from faculty, legislators and influential alumni. |
| Twelfth; 1994–03 | | Talbot D'Alemberte Retired as FSU President after nine years at ago 70. He continued to teach and litigate until his death in 2019. |
| Thirteenth; 2003–10 | | T. K. Wetherell The first FSU graduate to serve as president, he resigned after seven years on January 31, 2010 due to complications from cancer. |
| Fourteenth; 2010–14 | | Eric J. Barron After four years at FSU he resigned on April 2, 2014 to accept the position of President at Pennsylvania State University. |
| Interim; 2014 | | When Eric Barron resigned as president on April 2, 2014, Provost Garnett S. Stokes served as acting president until November 10, 2014, when John Thrasher became president. |
| Fifteenth; 2014–2021 | | John E. Thrasher retired at age 78 after almost seven years as president and returned to his old law firm. |
| Sixteenth; 2021–Present | | Richard D. McCullough, a graduate of the University of Texas and Johns Hopkins University, is the university's 16th president. He assumed office Aug. 16, 2021, succeeding President ·John E. Thrasher. |

== Timeline of Florida State University presidential terms ==
Presidents of Florida State University

== See also ==
- Florida State Seminoles
- History of Florida State University
- List of Florida State University people
- President's House (Florida State University)
