= President's House (Florida State University) =

Residence of the President of Florida State University

FSU President's House
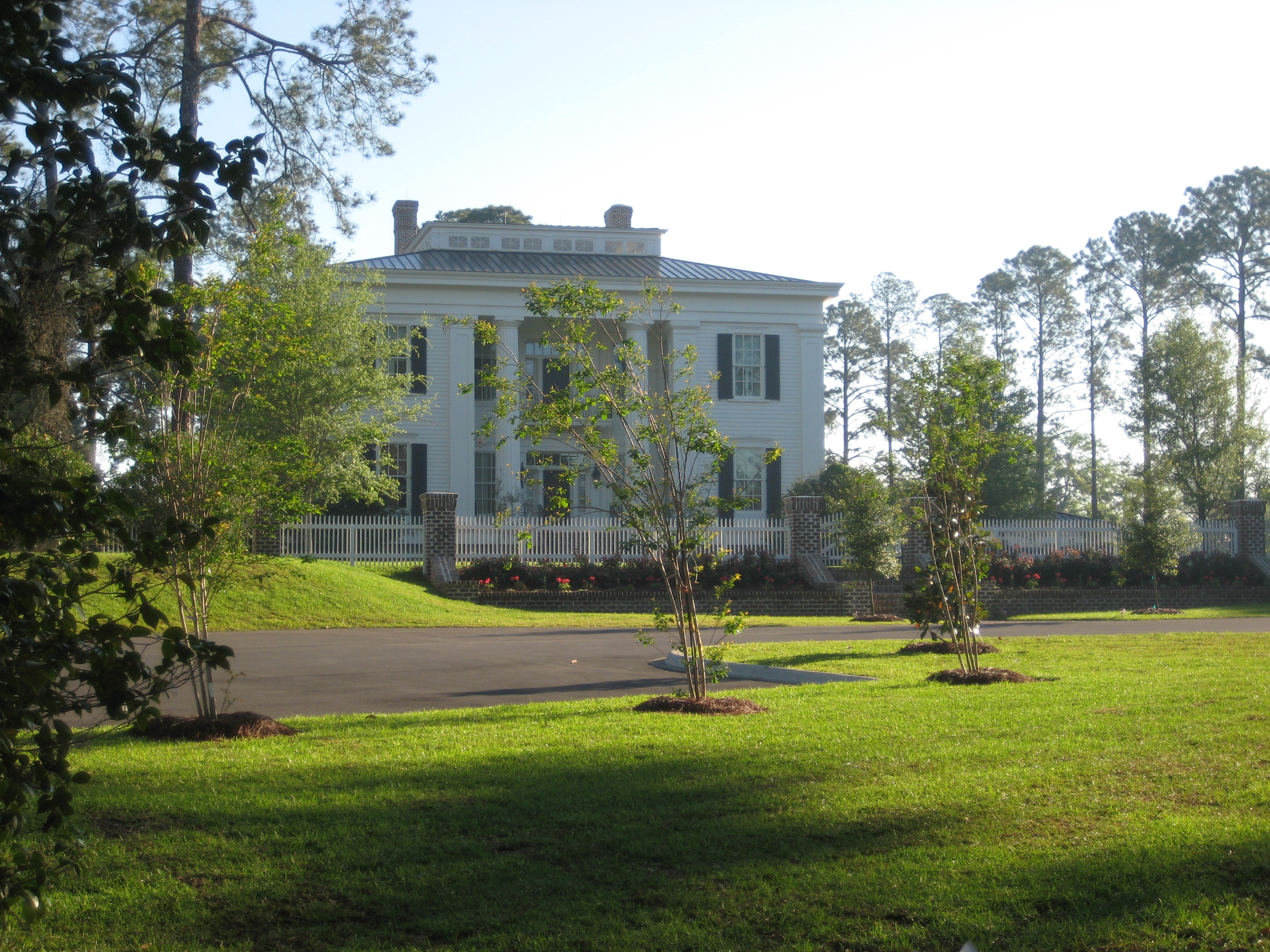
- Interactive map of the FSU President's House area

General information
- Type: Hospitality & residence
- Architectural style: Greek Revival architecture
- Location: 1000 West Tennessee Street, Florida State University
- Coordinates: 30.4481°N 84.2998°W
- Completed: 2007

Technical details
- Floor count: 3
- Floor area: 13,068
- Lifts/elevators: 2

Design and construction
- Architect: Aaron Dailey
- Architecture firm: Historical Concepts Architecture & Planning
- Main contractor: Skip Sheffield

Website
- President's House calendar

The FSU President's House, is a 13,068 ft² Greek Revival-style building located at 1000 West Tennessee Street, across from the main campus. Visitors to Tallahassee might think it had always been there, which was the intention, but it was completed in 2007. The mansion has served as the Florida State University president's residence since that year and is used to host students, faculty, staff, scholars and alumni; government officials and legislators; national and foreign dignitaries; as well as corporate representatives, friends and constituents.

== History ==
FSU's first President's Home, the McIntosh House, was located on the corner of St. Augustine and Duval. It was built in 1895, but moved in 1948 to the FSU campus for president Doak Campbell and family. The families of seven other presidents lived there, ending with President D'Alemberte. During the time Sandy D'Alemberte was President of FSU, the Official President's Home had deteriorated to the point where he and first lady Patsy Palmer moved out. D’Alemberte owned a home in a nearby neighborhood, so it was a slight inconvenience for him. However, after T. K. Wetherell became president, his home was almost 35 miles from the campus, making late evening drives home difficult. A room was renovated in Dodd Hall as a pied-à-terre for Wetherell and his wife, which is now being used by visiting dignitaries and trustees.

This situation clearly demonstrated the need for change, so the decision was made to renovate the existing structure as the Pearl Tyner Alumni Welcome Center and build a new home for the president. John E. Thrasher, chairman of the FSU Board of Trustees at the time, stated that FSU needed a distinguished home for their president, but the funding should be from private donations, not public funding. The location would be near the Alumni Association complex, but not part of it.

== Planning ==
When President Wetherell was inducted as FSU president in January 2003, Thrasher gave FSU First Lady Ginger Wetherell a challenge: plan and oversee construction of a new President's residence. Mrs. Wetherell was well qualified for the job. She was the first female to represent Pensacola in the Florida House of Representatives, first Secretary of the Florida Department of Environmental Protection and a successful lobbyist. She enjoyed entertaining people and understood the needs for big and small events. She and her husband built their Oak Hill Plantation home several years before, gaining knowledge about history, architecture and home furnishings. She understood that the project would be a lasting legacy and devoted countless hours researching, planning and monitoring the construction. Her passion for the job “consumed” her attention for two years.

West Florida Seminary main building c. 1870

As part of the research for the project, the Wetherells got invitations to visit numerous presidents’ homes in both their own Atlantic Coast Conference and Southeastern Conference. The President's home at the University of Georgia was built in 1856 and favored by Ginger because the building is “the real thing”. Presidential homes at both the University of Virginia and University of Maryland were also considered outstanding. Ginger stated, “We learned that the most successful homes not only were elegant and efficient for entertaining large crowds, they were comfortable and gave the family a sense of privacy and the feeling of being home.”

Greek Revival architecture was chosen because it was prevalent for college campus structures and there was an 1854 Greek Revival structure at the West Florida Seminary. It was also Mrs. Wetherell's favorite; she and her husband built their own Greek Revival-style home ten years earlier and had learned a great deal from that experience. She was the guiding force for the planning, construction and furnishing. Her vision was an elegant but comfortable home that reflected the university's heritage. In her own words, “I wanted this house to feel like it’s always been here – to feel like the University grew up around it.”

After reviewing some of the work done by Historical Concepts Architecture & Planning company in Atlanta, Mrs. Wetherell contacted them and decided to utilize their expertise on the President's home. Aaron Dailey was primary architect for the project, and Skip Sheffield, who built the Wetherell's Oak Hill Plantation, was chosen as contractor.

== Fundraising ==
Immediately after plans were announced to build a new President's Home, the response from university supporters and alumni was overwhelming. Monetary donations and pledges came pouring in. Board of Trustees Chairman Thrasher commented that the response was “a direct reflection of the popularity of President Wetherell and the first lady.”

== Construction ==
The floors and staircases throughout the house are random-planked heart-of-pine. The wood flooring in the Event Room was saved from the Montgomery Gymnasium (now the Montgomery Building). An alumni installed that floor in an unusual pattern which required multiple sandings. The remaining flooring was salvaged from Northern Factories. The exterior of the first floor is dark red brick, as well as walkways and stairs to the house. The exterior is white with black shutters; all the railings are made of Wrought iron painted black. There are two massive fluted Greek doric columns at the front entrance.

Colonial moldings utilize a heavy use of wood to decorate corners, baseboards, window frames and door frames. Students enrolled in the Master Craftsman Program at FSU created nearly all of the extensive moldings used in every room of the house and the fireplace columns. There are transom windows over most of the doors which share natural light between rooms. They can also be opened for ventilation. All the trim and doors are painted white. Most of the walls are a lemon-gold color.

Architect Dailey commented that all the workers, from student craftsmen, volunteers, subcontractors to general contractor Skip Sheffield all shared Mrs. Wetherell's passion before the job ended. When the painters did not show up, she painted and enlisted volunteers to help meet deadlines. She also laid paving bricks to enhance the exterior.

== Layout ==
The first floor of the President's house is utilitarian. A large screened terrace in the rear leads to the Event Room that has a bar on one side and the billiard room on the other. A vestibule is situated in the northeast corner with an adjoining coatroom. There is a Porte-cochère on the east side, with a trellised breezeway leading to the service entrance. The catering kitchen is in the southeast corner with the men's and women's restrooms along the south wall. An elevator and a dumbwaiter service all three floors.

The second floor of the President's house is the main level and designed for entertaining with three fireplaces. Stairs lead to the front porch, then a large entrance hall. A reception room is on the left and the formal dining room is on the right. Across the center of the house is the stair hall, with stairs on the left and the elevator on the right. The butler's pantry is between the dining room and the kitchen, with the breakfast room on the opposite side of the kitchen. The Great room is in the center of the house with a bar and sitting room in the northwest corner. Inside the east side entrance there are coat and powder rooms.

The third floor of the President's house is the private residence. Besides the master suite with two fireplaces, there are two guest bedrooms and bathrooms plus a small kitchen and family room.

There is a fourth floor used for mechanical access, which was initially left unfinished.

== Furnishings ==
The house is filled with historic images, art, books, and other memorabilia significant to FSU. In addition to money, alumni donated numerous antiques, and the house contains pieces on loan from the FSU Museum of Fine Arts. Sarasota's John and Mable Ringling Museum of Art loaned more than a dozen paintings for the house. The home's decoration uses the garnet and gold in combination with subtle hues and fabrics.

An 1800s era gas chandelier with crystal prisms made of brass is suspended from the living room ceiling along with Jacques Emile Blanche's “The Chess Players”, which sits over the fireplace. Two Turkish rugs were purchased by the Wetherells in the Greek Isles while on a tour sponsored by the university. Placed above a mahogany chest is Gaston Anglade's “Harbor at Sunset” from Ringling.

The walls in the library are paneled in cypress wood and contains an antique loveseat and a Frederic Remington bronze sculpture. 17th-century French chandelier moved from the previous president's home and donated antique dining chairs. “Still Life with Fruit” by Juriaen van Streeck hangs over the fireplace mantle.

The breakfast nook chairs are Duncan Phyfe lyre-backed.

The butler's pantry contains a Havilland china 12-place setting, a 200-piece set of Homer Laughlin China in garnet and gold, donated by Aramark and 12-piece service of sterling silverware from Gorham, which has daily use.

== Awards ==
Historical Concepts was honored with the 2009 Philip Trammell Shutze Award in the Small Institutional category for the FSU President's home.

Historical Concepts was also the recipient of the 2016 Addison Mizner Award in Institutional Design for the FSU President's home.

In November 2019, Ginger Wetherell was honored by FSU President John Thrasher for her work on the President's House. A plaque was unveiled honoring FSU's former First Lady for her dedication to the project. The plaque will remain in the house for perpetuity. It was the first time she had returned to the house since she and former FSU President Wetherell left in 2010. Mrs. Wetherell commented, “I’m just flooded with memories today, walking up the steps and seeing how the trees have grown that we transplanted here, seeing the house in such perfect condition. It still looks perfectly new, fresh and beautiful. I’m thrilled.”

She was also honored in March, 2022 with FSU's Torch Award.

== Siteplan ==
The president's home was constructed on the east side of a 16.7 acre parcel where the FSU Alumni Complex and newly renovated Pearl Tyner Alumni Welcome Center were situated. A dedicated driveway provides private access to the residence; a secondary entrance directs guests to the lower levels. There is a formal garden separating the adjacent Alumni Center and the rear lawn provides space for large events.

The site plan included a garage designed to resemble a carriage house, an old-fashioned summer kitchen with covered terrace for entertaining outdoors, and a cottage for guests. The Wetherells and the FSU Trustees hoped these features would be added at a later date and as funds allow.

== Gallery ==
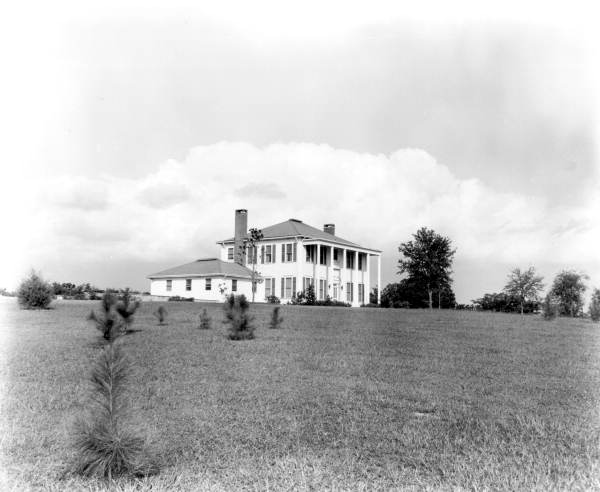
1950 McIntosh House; “house on the hill"

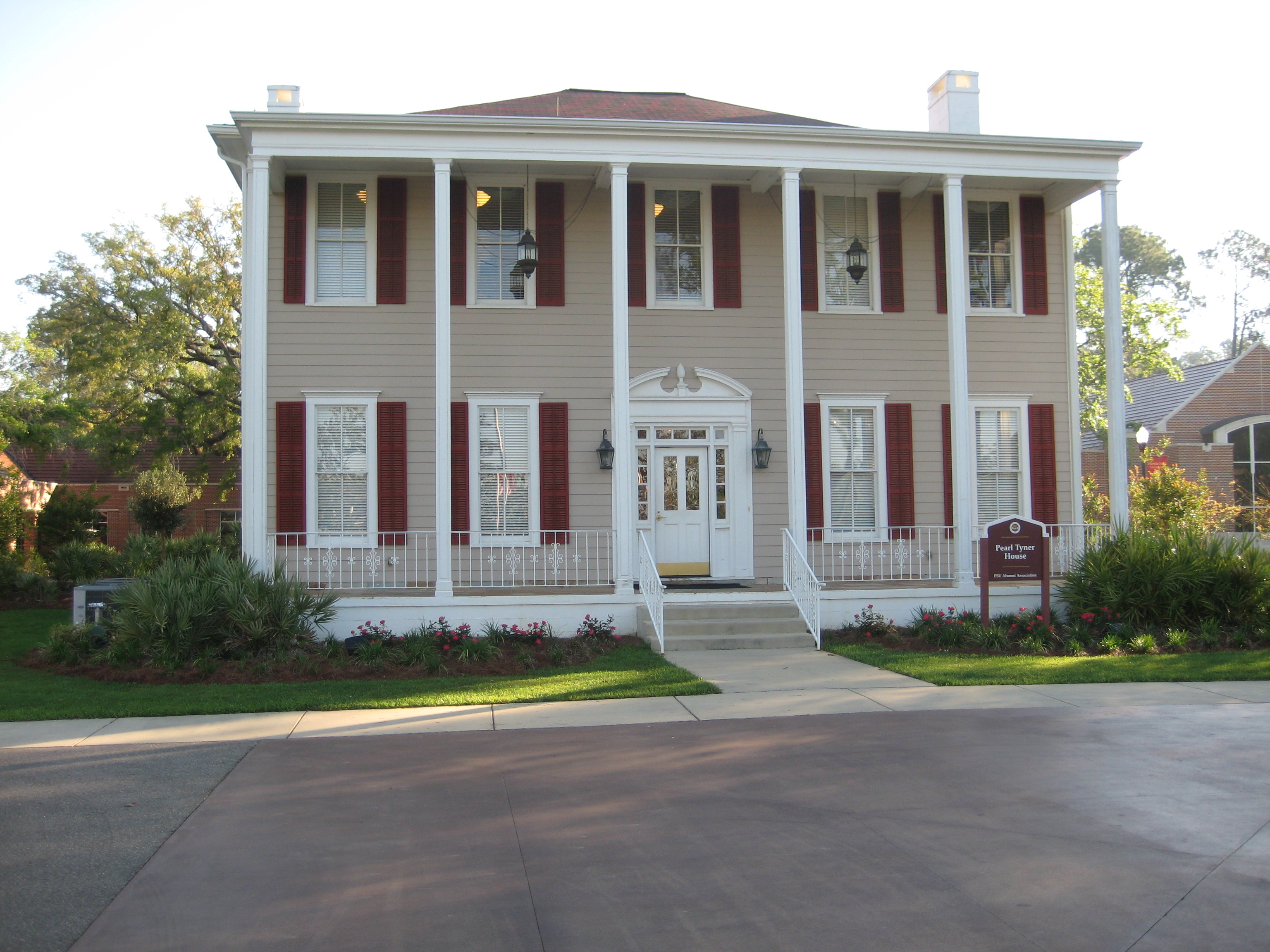
The renamed Pearl Tyner "Alumni" House

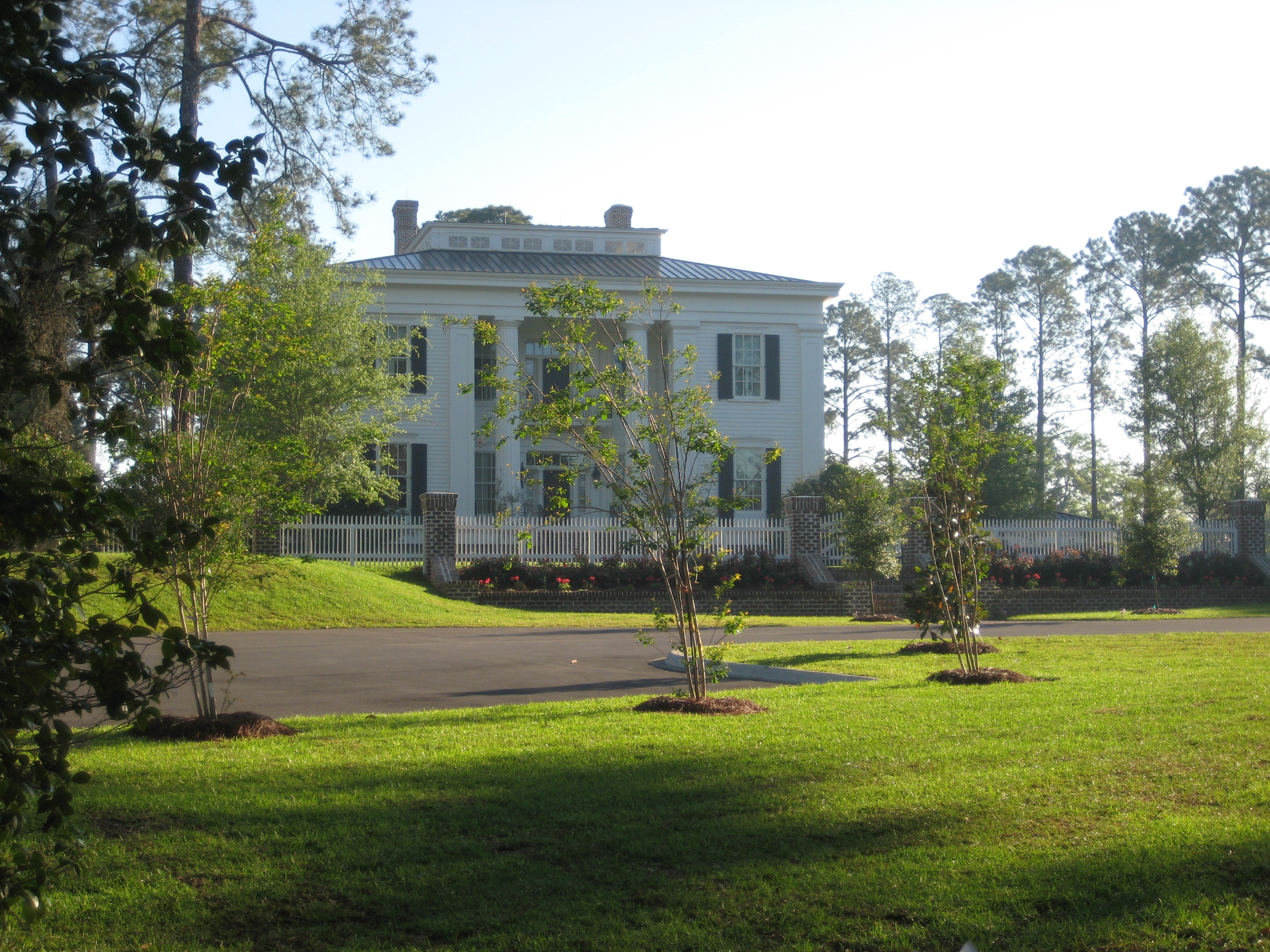
FSU President's House from Tennessee St.

== See also ==
- Presidents Houses in the United States
- List of presidents of Florida State University
