= T. K. Wetherell =

American politician and educator (1945–2018)

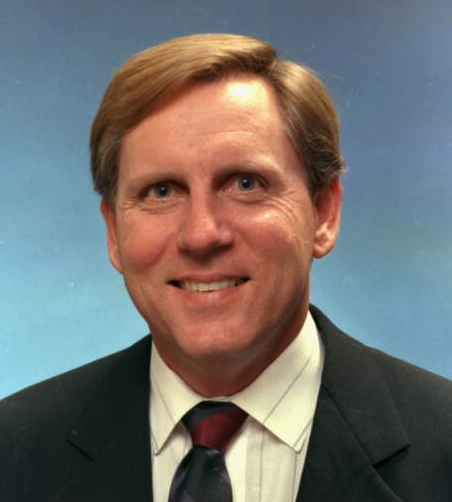

13th President of the Florida State University
- In office January 6, 2003 – January 31, 2010
- Preceded by: Sandy D'Alemberte
- Succeeded by: Eric J. Barron

4th President of the Tallahassee Community College
- In office 1995–2001
- Preceded by: James H. Hinson, Jr.
- Succeeded by: William D. Law

86th Speaker of the Florida House of Representatives
- In office November 20, 1990 – November 3, 1992
- Preceded by: Tom Gustafson
- Succeeded by: Bolley Johnson

Member of the Florida House of Representatives
- In office November 4, 1980 – November 3, 1992
- Preceded by: J. Hyatt Brown
- Succeeded by: Jimmy Charles (redistricting)
- Constituency: 31st district (1980–1982); 29th district (1982–1992)

Personal details
- Born: Thomas Kent Wetherell; December 22, 1945 Daytona Beach, Florida, U.S.
- Died: December 16, 2018 (aged 72) Tallahassee, Florida, U.S.
- Party: Democratic
- Spouses: Peggy Thompson (m. 1967; div. 1987) Ginger Bass (m. 1988)
- Children: 3, including Kent
- Education: Florida State University (BA, MEd, EdD)
- Known for: Rebuilding Florida State University

Thomas Kent Wetherell (December 22, 1945 – December 16, 2018) was an American politician and educator. He served as a member of the Florida House of Representatives from 1980 to 1992, and was president of Florida State University from 2003 through 2009.

== Early life ==
Wetherell was born in Daytona Beach, Florida, to a well known pioneer family of the Daytona Beach area. His father, Thomas James Wetherell, was born in Holly Hill on February 16, 1912, and his mother was Mildred Juanita Kent Wetherell. His paternal great grandparents Thomas Wetherell (1845-1921) and Margaret Wetherell who travelled to the United States by schooner from Durham, England, arrived in the Daytona Beach area in 1876. His grandfather, Thomas Wetherell (1867–1945), was involved in many of the firsts in the area including helping build the Ponce de Leon Lighthouse. Wetherell attended Port Orange Elementary School and Mainland High School. He attended Florida State University (FSU) on a football scholarship as a wide receiver and played from 1963 to 1967. Unfortunately for Wetherell, other teammates included Fred Biletnikoff and Ron Sellers, both future hall of famers. While at FSU, Wetherell joined the Phi Delta Theta fraternity. He earned two academic degrees in social studies and education, in 1967 and 1968. In 1974, he received a doctorate in education administration from FSU.

== Political career ==
While in Daytona, Wetherell was inspired by the success of J. Hyatt Brown, another Mainland H.S. graduate, and decided to try politics. Wetherell, a Democrat, was a member of the Florida House of Representatives from 1980 to 1992, and Speaker of the House in 1991 and 1992. He served as chair of the House's appropriations and education committees. While speaker, he blocked Republican redistricting actions aimed at limiting the impact of black voters. He supervised reform of campaign and state ethics laws. He also supported the movement to reduce state government spending while simultaneously pushing the expenditure of $38 million for construction of the FSU University Center which eventually cost $100 million.

James Harold Thompson, speaker of the house prior to T.K., commented that Wetherell thoroughly understood the appropriations process and that knowledge helped him be successful at TCC and FSU. "He set in motion a recognition of excellence in higher education that has been carried over by others inside and outside of the Legislature.”

== Educational career ==
Wetherell's first position was at FSU as an academic counselor for student-athletes. He was then hired to assist the dean of housing at Florida Technological University (now University of Central Florida), then director of housing and assistant to the vice president. He became an associate professor of education at Bethune-Cookman College before becoming dean, provost and vice president at Daytona Beach Community College.

He was considered for President at the University of West Florida in 1987, but not selected. When FSU President Bernard F. Sliger resigned in 1991, Wetherell was a finalist as his replacement, but Dale Lick was chosen. When Lick left after a few years, Wetherell was again one of two, but Sandy D'Alemberte got the nod.

After leaving the Florida legislature, he was president of the Independent Colleges and Universities of Florida.

=== TCC ===
Wetherell served as president of Tallahassee Community College (TCC) from 1995 to 2001. During his time as president, enrollment doubled as did the number of buildings on campus including a Student Union, health studies and second-floor additions for English, extended studies and security. Permits for a History and Social Sciences building had been submitted when he resigned. That building was eventually named for Wetherell. Fifty new programs were added, and TCC was nationally ranked in the top-25 for the number of community college graduates.

After he resigned from his post at TCC, Wetherell was a lobbyist for the Southern Strategy Group.

=== FSU ===
The FSU Board of Trustees appointed Wetherell as president on December 18, 2002. He was the first FSU graduate to serve as the school's president. His salary was ranked among the top ten for public university presidents in the United States. Later, Lee Hinkle joined Wetherell's administration as a vice president for university relations. In late 2006, he added his voice to efforts by Bernie Machen, president of the University of Florida to bring a play-off to Division I-A college football.

President Wetherell's accomplishments at FSU:

- Highlighted the history of FSU by erecting statues in tribute to the school's black pioneers, women's college history and past presidents. He expanded the FSU Legacy Walk begun by President Bernard F. Sliger in 1989 and added a statue and stained-glass wall for football legend Bobby Bowden.
- The Applied Superconductivity Center accepted an invitation to move from the University of Wisconsin to the National High Magnetic Field Laboratory at Innovation Park in Tallahassee after 20 years in Madison.
- The FSU College of Medicine graduated its first class in 2005 and was accredited. Their building was completed in 2006. Six regional campuses were established including research collaborations with the Mayo Clinic in Jacksonville and Tallahassee Memorial HealthCare.
- New buildings in 2008 included the Jim King Life Sciences building, the Psychology building, and the Chemical Sciences Laboratory (CSL) building.
- TK's wife, Ginger Wetherell, acted as project manager for planning, construction and furnishing of the new President's House which opened in August 2007.
- A new Alumni Center was completed and the old President's house renovated and renamed the Pearl Tyner Alumni Welcome Center.
- Engineered the departure of Bobby Bowden
- Helped FSU weather the 2008 financial crisis when state university funding was slashed for three years.
- The $33-million Ruby Diamond Auditorium renovation was completed in 2010.
- Successfully won the battle with the NCAA over the use of the Seminole name.
- Enhanced the relationship with the Seminole Tribe of Florida by establishing a scholarship program for students from the Seminole Tribe, creating a Seminole history course, unveiling a bronze statue at the University Center depicting a Seminole family during the Second Seminole War of the 1830s. A new tradition includes tribe members participating at commencement ceremonies.
- Created the Office of Undergraduate Research and Creative Endeavors which was later renamed the Center for Undergraduate Research and Academic Engagement. Graduation rates improved as did student retention.
- Used brick to transform Doak Campbell Stadium, which looked like an erector set, into a grand coliseum and unified the architecture of Florida State.
- Additional construction of parking garages, residence and dining halls was not as spectacular, but necessary.
- Wetherell increased the number of doctorates awarded, the total research dollars received by the university, and the academic profile of FSU students which led to new construction projects worth tens of millions.

Although T. K. Wetherell resigned as FSU's president in 2010, he didn't leave the campus. He moved to a modest office in the College of Education where he taught an online course and monitored the Center for Higher Education Research, Training and Innovation which helps build portfolios for junior faculty members.

== Personal life ==
After a 1987 divorce from his first wife, with whom he had a son in 1970, Wetherell married Ginger Wetherell, a former Florida state government official and state legislator; he gained two stepdaughters from the 1988 marriage. His son, T. Kent Wetherell II is a lawyer and judge of the United States District Court for the Northern District of Florida.

=== Oak Hill ===
While serving in the Florida House, T. K. Wetherell began purchasing parcels of land in the Red Hills Region of Jefferson County, Florida that would become the 983-acre Oak Hill Plantation. The property is near Lamont, an unincorporated community and census-designated place (CDP) 30 miles east of Tallahassee. Following their wedding, the couple began planning to build a home on the property. Design inspiration for the home came from the historic Asa May house in nearby Capps, Florida. Architectural elements from historic buildings being demolished or purchased at auctions were incorporated into the plans. Tallahassee's Old Floridian Hotel was the source of four huge 19th-century windows that were placed at the ends of the main hallways on each side of the first floor. The ceilings are thirteen-feet tall to frame the jumbo windows. The staircase off the grand foyer used pine from the Old Ormond Hotel which opened in 1888 and was built by Henry Flagler. Other historic elements from the Ormond Hotel include fireplace mantels, doorknobs, and other hardware. Flooring throughout the house is heart-of-pine. Construction on a two-story Plantation house was begun in 1990 and completed the following year. There are formal living and dining rooms, a library with a comfortable reading area, a parlor with a wet bar, a chef's kitchen outfitted with high-end appliances and an informal dining area; a separate caterer’s kitchen; a butler’s pantry, an office, a Home cinema featuring pediments and light fixtures once in the old Florida Capital building, and a screened porch overlooking the landscaped backyard. The second-floor porch has a view of the lake.

=== Honors ===
- FSU Football Hall of Fame 1991
- Moore-Stone Award
- the Circle of Gold Award
- FSU Distinguished Service Award
- honorary Doctorate of Letters from Flagler College.
- T. K. Wetherell History and Social Sciences building named for him at Tallahassee Community College
- Bronze statue of T.K. Wetherell at FSU's Westcott Plaza, unveiled in January 2010
- the 8-floor FSU University Center Building "A" was named the T.K. Wetherell Building

=== Health ===
Wetherell was diagnosed with prostate cancer in 2002.

Wetherell had been seeing physicians at the Mayo Clinic in Jacksonville for several years, but in 2009 his doctors referred him to M.D. Anderson Cancer Center. His wife Ginger accompanied him to the facility in Houston and they returned every three weeks for more treatments. However, his cancer battle began to take more and more of his time.

Wetherell stated, “We’ve been through Expandia and all the drugs. They work for a while and then they quit working. I’ve done different trials. The bottom line is, I knew that this was coming to some degree or another. I knew I couldn’t do the stuff I needed to do at FSU. It’s just a 24/7 job. It’s a great job, I’m glad I did it. But I knew I couldn’t do it at the level I knew it needed to be done.” Wetherell had hoped for a few more years; he was only 65. He resigned as FSU's president on January 31, 2010.

Until his death, he and his wife lived at the 983-acre Oak Hill Plantation in Jefferson County, Florida, east of Tallahassee. He was a fan of hunting birds including turkey, dove and quail on the estate. In October 2003 he and his wife announced the donation of the $10 million Oak Hill Plantation to FSU after they die, and in 2012 or 2013 he changed his will to leave it to his wife. He also owned a ranch in Montana where he invited family and friends to spend time during summers. A close friend noted that Wetherell also loved country music, NASCAR, Blue Bell ice cream and fried food. His FSU bio claimed that his interests included athletics, hunting & fishing, aviation and travel.

He died from complications due to cancer on December 16, 2018, six days before his 73rd birthday.

== See also ==
- List of Florida State University people
- List of presidents of Florida State University
