= Pearl Long Cullen =

American politician

- Born: July 3, 1890
- Died: November 6, 1979 (aged 89)
- Education: Florida State University
- Known for: Being a pioneer in the state of Florida

Pearl Long Cullen (July 3, 1890 - November 6, 1979) was the first woman to hold a constitutional office in the state of Florida. She was also the first woman to be elected to a constitutional office in the state of Florida. In 1923, upon the death of her father, who was the elected tax collector, Cullen was appointed by the governor to serve out her father's term. In 1925, Boyce Williams won the election as tax collector. Cullen continued to work in the tax office, and, in 1941, was once again appointed by the governor as tax collector of Lake County, Florida. In 1944, Cullen successfully sought the office and served consecutive terms as tax collector until her retirement in 1959. No other woman prior to Cullen's appointment in 1923, or until her win in 1941, had held a constitutional office in Florida.

Cullen attended Florida State College for Women, now known as Florida State University. She graduated in 1911, one year after Essie Long Duncan, her sister. Both women were members of Alpha Delta Pi and both are memorialized on the campus of Florida State University by a commemorative bench fabricated by the Florida State University Master Craftsman Studio. The inscription on the plaque reads: "In Celebration of Alpha Delta Pi 150 Years, May 15, 2001, Dedicated to Iota Chapter and Placed in Memory of Pearle Long Cullen, Essie Long Duncan by Susan Miller Jones."

Pearl Long Cullen is a member of the Lake County Women's Hall of Fame.
