= Whitney Tavern Stand =

- U.S. National Register of Historic Places

- Location within Michigan Location within the United States
- Interactive map
- Location: Cascade Township, Kent County, Michigan
- Nearest city: Alto
- Coordinates: 42°52′09.03″N 85°27′32.38″W
- Built: 1853
- Architectural style: Greek Revival
- NRHP reference No.: 06001326
- Added to NRHP: 2007-02-01

The Whitney Tavern Stand served as an inn and local gathering place in Cascade Township, Michigan for fifty years after its construction in the 1852-53 period. In its first few years it served as a stop for stagecoaches on the lines that, connecting Battle Creek, Hastings, and Kalamazoo with Grand Rapids, passed through Whitneyville. It is listed in the National Register of Historic Places.

== Significance ==
The Whitney Tavern Stand served as an inn and local gathering place in Cascade Township, Michigan for fifty years after its construction in the 1852-53 period. In its first few years it served as a stop for stagecoaches on the lines that, connecting Grand Rapids with Battle Creek, Hastings, and Kalamazoo. Following the completion of a more direct plank road between Kalamazoo and Grand Rapids that siphoned off traffic, it continued to serve the stage line between Battle Creek and Grand Rapids via Hastings until around 1870. At that point stage service ended with the completion of the Grand River Valley Railroad line through Hastings to Grand Rapids. Despite alterations since its conversion to a private home in the early twentieth century, the hotel, with its side-gable form and eight-bay wide façade, retains much of the characteristic appearance of a southern Michigan stagecoach inn dating from the mid-nineteenth century.

Cascade Township was created from Ada Township, Michigan in 1848. Settlement began in 1836 but proceeded slowly for the first few years. Development beginning in 1838 of a state road between Battle Creek and Grand Rapids that passed through the township along what are now Whitneyville Avenue and Cascade Road served as a major impetus to settlement. The Battle Creek-Grand Rapids road was one of many routes in southern Michigan laid out and built at the direction of the legislature of the newly established state of Michigan in the late 1830s and early 1840s. It followed what seems today a not very direct route between the two places, passing through the early settlement of Gull Prairie – what is now Richland – well west and only a bit north of Battle Creek, before turning directly north through Prairieville, Middleville, Whitneyville, and Cascade to Grand Rapids.

Good Intent Lines of Coaches served the Whitney Tavern Stand in Whitneyville for a number of years.

By the early 1840s stages over this road were carrying passengers between Battle Creek and Grand Rapids. By the late 1840s Patterson & Ward (W. G. Patterson of Kalamazoo and John K. Ward of Battle Creek) provided stagecoach service. By late 1854 the Good Intent Line (C. W. Lewis, proprietor) was providing stagecoach service between Battle Creek and Kalamazoo, at one end, and Grand Rapids, with the Battle Creek and Kalamazoo routes merging at Richland. Beginning in the 1840s, stagecoaches also operated from Battle Creek north to Hastings, west to Middleville, and on to Grand Rapids along the same route. All of this traffic passed through Whitneyville, and most or all of it presumably stopped at Whitney's tavern.

The Whitneys were among the early settlers in Cascade Township. The families of Zerah Whitney (1784-1873), a Connecticut native, and his sons Ezra (1815–99) and Peter arrived in the 1841-42 period and took up land at the site of what soon became known as Whitneyville. The hamlet acquired the township's first post office in 1849 and eventually contained a sawmill, grist mill, store, blacksmith shop, church, and a few scattered houses. But the significance of Whitneyville declined after 1888 when the Grand Rapids, Lansing and Detroit Railroad, the only railroad line built through the area, established its station a mile away at McCords.

Ezra Whitney built a small log hotel in 1842 on a site across the road and a short distance to the south from the present house. He replaced this original hotel with the present frame Whitney Tavern Stand – so identified in an 1870 history – in 1852 or 53. The new tavern and hostelry as built was an L-shaped building with a two-story portico across the front, a ballroom occupying the second story of the entire street-facing front section, and a large wing, containing the kitchen and presumably lodging quarters, extending to the rear from the hotel's north end. The hotel served travelers’ needs as a stagecoach stop and inn providing meals and overnight accommodations and also served as a local watering hole and, with its second-story ballroom, presumably social and cultural center as well. Information about specific events held in the Whitney's ballroom is lacking, but typically these country inn ballrooms hosted a broad range of functions, from dances and entertainments to religious services, church socials, and political meetings.

Whitney was not to enjoy his prosperity for long. In 1855 a plank road turnpike that provided a far more direct connection between Kalamazoo and Grand Rapids than the older stagecoach routes through Richland and Whitneyville was completed. The plank road, permitting a six-hour trip from Kalamazoo to Grand Rapids as opposed to the old two-day time frame, took over the traffic between Kalamazoo and Grand Rapids that formerly passed through Whitneyville. It may also have absorbed much of the traffic between Battle Creek and Grand Rapids as well, since passengers could ride the Michigan Central Railroad between Battle Creek and Kalamazoo and then ride the stage up to Grand Rapids in far less time – and far greater comfort – than by taking the stage on the old state road. Whitney, who must have seen the handwriting on the wall, built a new hotel at Bradley on the Kalamazoo-Grand Rapids plank road when the road opened and sold his Whitneyville hotel to Abner C. Bruen.

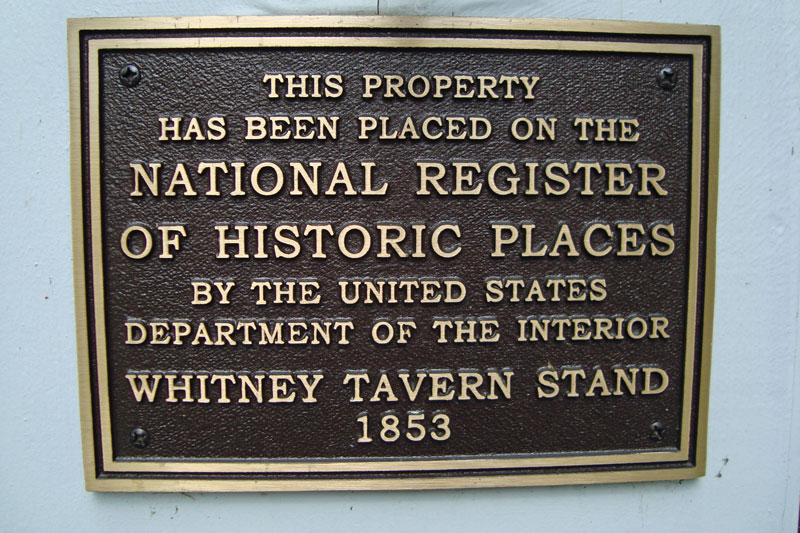

Nevertheless, stagecoaches continued to run through Whitneyville on the Battle Creek-to-Grand Rapids route via Hastings until around 1870 when the Grand River Valley Railroad, from Jackson to Grand Rapids through Hastings, was completed. In addition, the state business gazetteers indicate that stage service, presumably operating from the hotel, connected Whitneyville with Caledonia Station (now Caledonia) on the Grand River Valley line during much of the 1880s – perhaps from the time the Valley line was completed until 1888 when the much closer GR, L & D line and its McCords depot opened.

Hotel proprietors after Ezra Whitney include Henry Proctor, listed in the 1867-69 state business gazetteers; S. F. Sliter, according to the township history in the 1870 county directory; John McQueen, listed in the 1870-71 state business gazetteer; Calvin W. Lewis from at least 1876 until 1879; and C. D. Campbell, Henry Best, and Thomas Russell later. The 1907 Kent County atlas's Whitneyville map identifies the building as a hotel, with R. S. Adley as owner – Richard S. and Adelia Winters Adley bought the property in 1893 – and shows the rear wing, but the state business gazetteers list no hotel in Whitneyville after the 1901-02 edition.

The Adleys renovated the hotel during, it appears, the 1910s or 20s, converting it into a single-family house. Their renovations, carried out while retaining much of the simple Greek Revival interior finish, included the removal of the two-story front portico and the rear wing and the addition of an enclosed porch at the north end and of two rooms on the rear. The interior renovations included oak floors downstairs along with some floor plan changes, including the addition of bathrooms, and the addition of a simply detailed brick fireplace, with stone tile hearth, in the living room at the building's north end, with a large brick chimney stack outside against the north wall. Upstairs the former ballroom was partitioned into bedrooms opening off a central hall. The lightweight, stud-less partitions are made of wallboard panels fastened with battens. The second-story remodeling was done without disturbing the still springy ballroom floor, which remains intact. Few changes have been made since then.

The earliest exterior photograph that has been found is from a 1957 newspaper article. The article includes an interview with Mrs. L. A. Brown who lived in the house for 65 years. She recalls a two-story porch stretching across the front but no photograph showing that has been found. However, many pictures and illustrations of taverns built around the time of the Whitney Tavern Stand show a two-story front porch as Mrs. Brown describes. It is not known when the porch was removed. The 1907 Standard Atlas of Kent County shows the footprint of the house being L-shaped. Other books and documents state that the rear wing was removed when the house was converted to a private residence in the early 1900s.

== Description ==
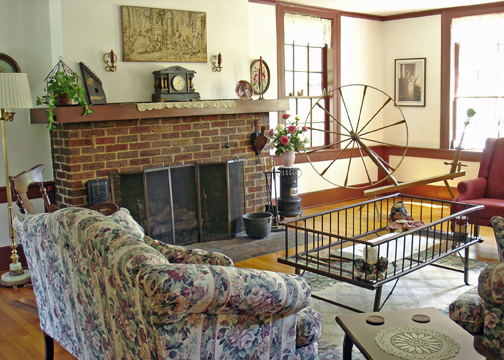
Interior showing the Gathering Room and fireplace.

Standing well back from the road on a knoll overlooking the Whitneyville mill pond, the Whitney Tavern Stand is a vernacular Greek Revival former hotel building. The two-story, side-gable hotel presents an unusually broad eight-bay wide façade to the street. The exterior walls are finished in wooden clapboarding and display broad plain board corner and frieze trim below the projecting eaves with their raking cornices without returns. The dominating feature of the front is the front entry, positioned slightly to the right of center, with its side and transom lights set in a classical frame of massy antae and flat-top two-part entablature.

The tavern stands on the west side of Whitneyville Avenue facing east toward the pond in Cascade Township, a growing suburb to the southeast of Grand Rapids. The Whitneyville area in which the hotel is located retains a largely rural aspect, with woods edging the property on the north and west. All that remains of the never-very-large Whitneyville settlement is the Old Time Methodist Church founded in 1854 and the Whitneyville Cemetery, both located ½ mile south of the house. Several owners of the Whitney Tavern Stand are buried in the Whitneyville Cemetery including: the Browns; Calvin Lewis, proprietor of the stage coach line that serviced Whitneyville; and Oscar Whitney, brother of Ezra Whitney, the builder of the Whitney Tavern Stand. Large trees stand in the hotel's front yard and along the south side of the paved driveway that runs along the south edge of the property, and a large open lawn forms the property's rear portion.

The original building has ground dimensions of sixty-one feet in length, north and south, and thirty-one in width, east and west. The wood frame building stands on fieldstone foundations that are six feet thick in places. The east façade is fronted by an 8-foot-deep (2.4 m) open verandah or terrace across the entire front, with a front staircase positioned in alignment with the front entry. The concrete-deck verandah with its wooden railing is supported on fieldstone and concrete retaining walls, concrete filling the space beneath the verandah to the north (right) of the front entrance where a 1957 newspaper article photograph shows a garage door entry to the basement level was then present. Many of the 9-over-6 windows still have the original ripple glass. Several of the hand-pegged interior doors are original, as is the front entry door.

The front entrance opens into a square-plan entry hall, from which doors lead north (right) into a large living room and south (left) into the smaller dining room. The hall may originally have extended entirely through the building. Like the rest of the downstairs, the hall floor is finished in narrow oak flooring. Part of the space directly behind the hall contains a bathroom and the rest is incorporated into a family room that extends into a 1910s or 20s-looking one-story hip-roof addition on the building's back.

The living room, the largest space, may have housed the hotel/tavern's dining area and bar. It occupies the entire north end except for a broad, apparently original staircase against the west wall that, opening into the room, provided access to the second-story ballroom. An enclosed one-story porch opens off the living room's north wall at the west end, and a brick fireplace, with stone tile hearth and boldly projecting, angular wood shelf, projects into the room along the north wall. Both features appear to date from the 1910s or 20s.

The dining room is significantly smaller in ground dimensions than the living room. Perhaps it served as a parlor for women guests, but this is only speculation with no solid information behind it. Today there is a small hallway with a narrow early twentieth-century staircase off it located behind the dining room. The hallway provides access to the kitchen, which occupies a second shallow but broad hip-roof early twentieth-century addition on the building's west side.

A doorway in the dining room's south side opens into the southern end of the building, containing two bedrooms separated by a bathroom. A one-story enclosed porch dating from after 1957 – the 1957 newspaper photograph does not show it – projects southward from the easterly of the two bedrooms.

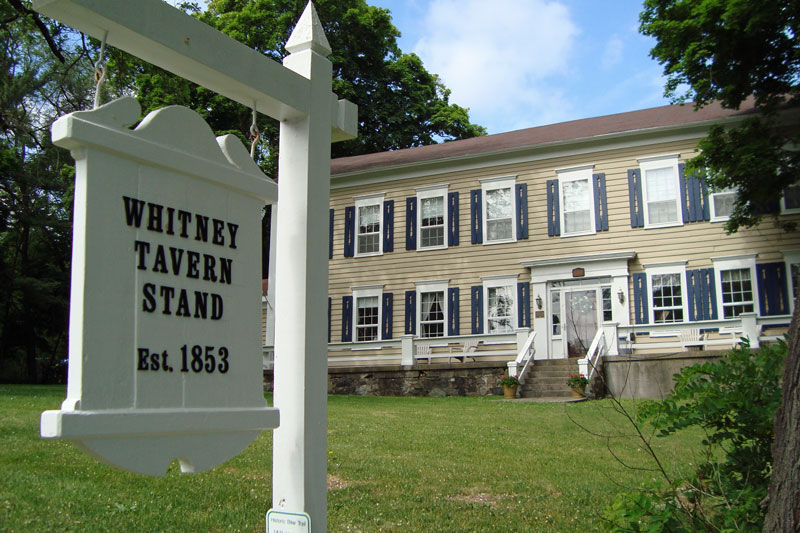

A ballroom, reached originally, it appears, only by the staircase in the building's northwest corner, occupied the entire second story. The space was spanned by a plaster ceiling that arched between the broad east and west walls the length of the room. Remnants of this ceiling structure survive in the attic above the current ceiling. The original ceiling includes original painted decorations on the gable ends and the soot-stained upper ceiling where the candelabras were used for lighting by candles. The dance floor was built to be "springy," as in other early taverns. To achieve the springy feeling, the floor was constructed with five or six sets of beams spanning the space from east to west. Each set of beams is composed of three individual six-inch square (approximately) beams, one on either side attached to a wall post using a wooden pin that allowed the beam to pivot slightly, and a central beam that, overlapping the side ones slightly at each end, was also attached to them with wooden pins. This floor structure remains intact, with heart pine flooring installed over the original.

The former ballroom space was reconfigured in the early twentieth century into five rooms plus a bathroom off a central hall, with a large stair hall at the northwest corner. The partitions – and ceilings as well – rather than being built using conventional construction of lath and plaster over studs, are light, stud-less structures composed of wallboard panels held together with thin wooden battens.

A large wing once projected to the west from the north end of the building's west side. It shows in the 1907 county atlas but was removed later, perhaps at the same time when all the other major renovations were done. This wing apparently contained the original kitchen, guest rooms, and, perhaps, other spaces. A rectangular in-ground concrete swimming pool, built in the 1969-73 period, with a white picket fence surrounding it, now stands directly behind the building on part of the site of the wing. No evidences of the wing's foundations are now apparent.

The surviving main front section of the former hotel retains a high degree of integrity overall. Much of the first-floor's plan as well as important features such as the ballroom floor construction and the original exterior and interior finish – such as Greek Revival architrave door and window trim, paneled doors, wide mopboards, and original nine-over-six windows – has survived intact through one hundred years of use since the building last served as a hotel and tavern.

The property associated with the tavern contains three other buildings. A two-story garage, modeled after old carriage house/stable buildings, with a side-gable roof, gabled front dormer, and clapboard siding matching the tavern's in width and color, stands at the west end of the driveway, southwest of the tavern. It was built during the summer of 2003. Two small frame sheds, each a single-story structure of gable-front form with a saltbox or leanto roof, the south slopes shorter than the north ones, stand north of the garage behind the house. Little historical information on these is available. They appear to date from the early to mid-twentieth century but may be older. The south outbuilding includes a chimney vent. When the present owners acquired the property the outbuilding contained a tin sink. The present owners have heard that at one time the south outbuilding was a laundry/summer kitchen. Nothing is known about the north outbuilding's historic use. However, the north outbuilding's interior walls are covered with one-inch thick tightly-seamed boards and has a small chimney vent. This may indicate the outbuilding was used as a meat house/smokehouse at one time.
