= T. Kent Wetherell II =

American judge (born 1970)

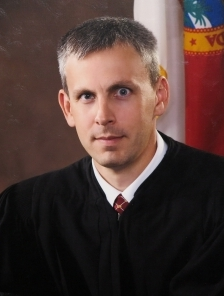

Judge of the United States District Court for the Northern District of Florida
- Incumbent
- Assumed office July 12, 2019
- Appointed by: Donald Trump
- Preceded by: John Richard Smoak Jr.

Judge of the Florida First District Court of Appeal
- In office October 1, 2009 – July 12, 2019
- Appointed by: Charlie Crist
- Succeeded by: Adam Tanenbaum

Personal details
- Born: August 26, 1970 (age 55) Daytona Beach, Florida, U.S.
- Spouse: Edie
- Children: 2
- Relatives: T. K. Wetherell (father); Ginger Wetherell (stepmother)
- Education: Florida State University (BS, JD)

Thomas Kent Wetherell II (born August 26, 1970) is a United States district judge of the United States District Court for the Northern District of Florida, and former Florida state court judge.

== Early life and education ==
Wetherell was born on August 26, 1970, in Daytona Beach, Florida to a politically active family. He earned his Bachelor of Science, magna cum laude, from Florida State University and his Juris Doctor, with high honors, from the Florida State University College of Law, where he was inducted into the Order of the Coif and served as an articles editor of the Florida State University Law Review.

== Legal career ==
Wetherell spent four years in private practice at the Tallahassee firm Hopping Green Sams & Smith, where his practice focused on representing landowners and real estate developers on land use matters before local governments and state agencies and representing corporate clients in administrative rule challenge and bid protest hearings. Before becoming a judge, he served for two years in the Office of the Florida Attorney General as Deputy Solicitor General.

== State judicial service ==
Wetherell served for seven years as an Administrative Law Judge of the Florida Division of Administrative Hearings, where he heard a wide variety of cases, involving rule challenges, bid protests, hospital certificates of need, environmental permit challenges, employment discrimination claims, and professional license disputes.

He was appointed a Judge of the Florida First District Court of Appeal by Florida Governor Charlie Crist and took office on October 1, 2009. His service on the state court terminated when he was appointed a federal district judge.

== Federal judicial service ==
On April 26, 2018, President Donald Trump announced his intent to nominate Wetherell to serve as a United States District Judge of the United States District Court for the Northern District of Florida. On May 7, 2018, his nomination was sent to the Senate. He was nominated to the seat vacated by Judge John Richard Smoak Jr., who assumed senior status on December 31, 2015. On October 17, 2018, a hearing on his nomination was held before the Senate Judiciary Committee.

On January 3, 2019, his nomination was returned to the President under Rule XXXI, Paragraph 6 of the United States Senate. On January 23, 2019, President Trump announced his intent to renominate Wetherell for a federal judgeship. His nomination was sent to the Senate later that day. On February 7, 2019, his nomination was reported out of committee by an 18–4 vote. On July 9, 2019, the Senate invoked cloture on his nomination by an 82–16 vote. On July 10, 2019, his nomination was confirmed by a 78–15 vote. He received his judicial commission on July 12, 2019.

Legal offices
Preceded by John Richard Smoak Jr.	Judge of the United States District Court for the Northern District of Florida; 2019–present	Incumbent
