= J. Stanley Marshall =

American College President and administrator

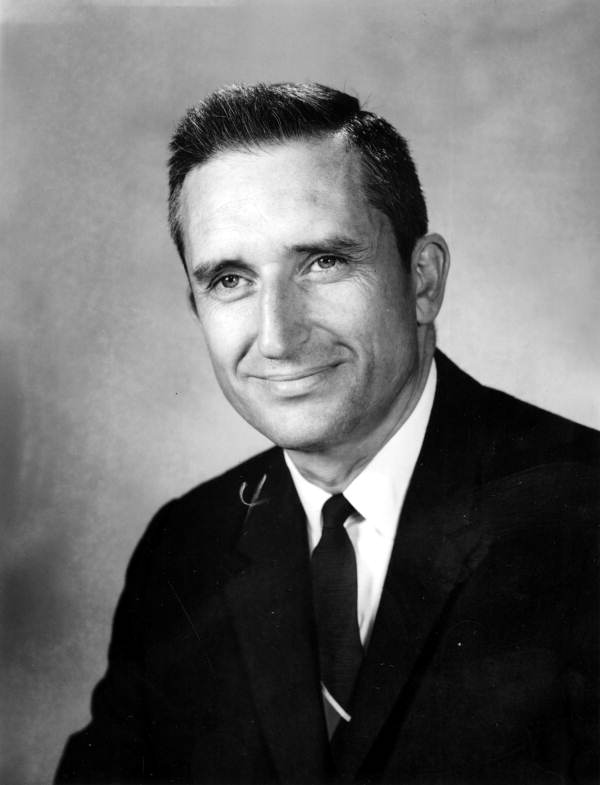
- Marshall in 1964

9th President of Florida State University
- In office 1969–1976
- Preceded by: John E. Champion
- Succeeded by: Bernard F. Sliger

Personal details
- Born: January 27, 1923 Cheswick, Pennsylvania, United States
- Died: June 8, 2014 (aged 91) Tallahassee, Florida, United States
- Spouses: Ruth Cratty (m. 1944; div. 1966) Shirley Slade (m. 1966)
- Children: 5
- Education: Slippery Rock State Teachers College: BS, 1947; Syracuse University: MS, 1950; PhD, 1956
- Occupation: Educator, administrator and college president
- Known for: science educator

James Stanley Marshall (January 27, 1923 – June 8, 2014), known as J. Stanley Marshall, was an American physicist, science educator, administrator and college president.

== Early life and education ==
Born in Cheswick, Pennsylvania, Marshall grew up in rural Pennsylvania. His parents Walter and Mildred were farmers: Stanley was the last of seven children and the only male.

Marshall worked at the Duquesne Light Company while attending college. He enlisted in the Army in 1943 before his junior year in college and served in World War II as a combat medic. The army discharged him in 1946 and he returned to school, graduating with a BS from Slippery Rock State Teachers College in 1947. He was a high school science teacher at Mynderse Academy in Seneca Falls, New York while earning a MS in 1950 from Syracuse University. For one year, he also coached basketball and track. Marshall was a physics professor at the State University of New York at Cortland while pursuing his 1956 Ph.D., also at Syracuse.

== FSU ==
In 1958 Marshall was recruited by the dean of education at Florida State University to establish a Department of Science Education in response to the Soviet Union's launch of Sputnik. America's leaders were concerned about a deficiency in science education. Marshall hosted a summer program for science teachers that was the first integrated program held at FSU. That seminar also began a long alliance with Bethune-Cookman College. The science education program graduated exceptional teachers for high schools in Florida and the university became highly regarded in educational circles. FSU was instrumental in establishing a science high school in NATO ally, Turkey. Marshall made numerous trips to visit and assist during the school's early years. He chaired the department until 1967.

In 1967, Marshall was promoted to Dean at the College of Education, then on February 12, 1969, he was chosen by President John E. Champion as the first executive vice president.

Champion resigned a week later, nine tumultuous months after he censored a story containing 4-letter words in the student's literary magazine, A Legend. The president believed the article was "inappropriate and too insensitive" for the FSU campus. That decision brought protests by students and faculty who considered it suppression of artistic expression. The clashes with the faculty continued in addition to demonstrations by students.

Following Champion's resignation, the Florida Board of Regents named Marshall as Acting President. One hundred days later, they appointed Marshall as the 9th president of FSU.

He served as president at Florida State University from February 1969 to August 1976.

=== Activism ===
Marshall's tenure at FSU matched the increase of student activism across the country as well as locally. FSU earned the moniker, "Berkeley of the South." Students held large demonstrations against the war in Vietnam and the Kent State shootings. A chapter of Students for a Democratic Society was formed and a Black Student Union. Students marched to change gender and racial policy, began a "free university" taught by students and joined the college craze of streaking. The politically conservative Marshall disagreed with the demonstrators on most everything but respected their First Amendment rights. He calmly listened to their grievances, but steadfastly refused to accede to their requests and demands.

=== Night of the Bayonets ===
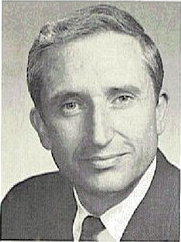
Marshall in 1969

Marshall refused give official student organization status to the Students for a Democratic Society (SDS) so as to deny them the use of university facilities, which the group had used previously. The policy of the Florida Board of Regents supported FSU's decision, so the SDS, which advocated non-violent civil disobedience, protested at the entrance to the Westcott Building in February 1969.

On March 4, 1969, approximately 150 students occupied the Union State Room to host national SDS secretary Fred Gordon. After the students refused to leave, a Circuit Court injunction was issued. After defying the injunction, 58 of the students were arrested by sheriff's deputies from Leon County who carried unloaded rifles with bayonets, but no violence ensued. Marshall later said he was concerned about violence and didn't want FSU to be the "Kent State of the South." Many students and faculty considered his response to student protests to be an overreaction to a perceived threat.

=== Faculty ===
The relationship between Marshall and the FSU faculty was sometimes difficult. He was often criticized for failing to communicate with the faculty who in turn opposed many changes that Marshall instituted, some of which were later reversed. Retired religion professor Leo Sandon stated, "The fact of the matter is he wasn't popular with the faculty; he called (meetings of) the faculty senate the Children's Hour. But I suppose Stan did bring a certain amount of decency and order to campus. He was not afraid of power and its use."

=== Accomplishments ===
An important aspect of Marshall's campus leadership was to advance integration through science education.

Marshall recognized the power of computer technology and the potential of computer-based learning/teaching. A powerful computer system was installed at FSU and national leaders in the field were recruited.

Marshall was responsible for acquiring two major financial donations to the FSU Foundation in 1971. At the time, the foundation has existed for ten years, but their results had been discouraging.

In 1972, FSU athletics had a $300,000 deficit. Marshall issued a challenge to community leaders for help, and the result was the creation of Seminole Boosters. In January 1976 Marshall also recovered from a mistake he made in 1970 when he passed on the chance to hire football coach Bobby Bowden, who was then an FSU assistant coach. In 1970 Marshall chose Larry Jones who lasted just three years at FSU. After two years of Darrell Mudra as coach following Jones, Bowden was hired by Marshall in 1976.

== Post FSU ==
After leaving FSU, he started the Sonitrol security company and remained president until 1987. He was unsuccessful as a candidate for Florida Commissioner of Education in 1986. In 1987 Marshall organized the James Madison Institute, a libertarian think tank in Tallahassee and remained active until his death in 2014. Marshall was a member of the Florida Constitutional Revision Commission in 1997, the first FSU Board of Trustees from 2002 to 2005, and the Florida Board of Governors of the State University System of Florida from 2004 to 2012. He also served on the board of trustees for Bethune-Cookman College for 12 years, chairman for 4. His book, The Tumultuous Sixties: Campus Unrest and Student Life at a Southern University, was published in 2006 and described the controversies of the era from his years as a college president and administrator. He was named a Fellow of the American Association for the Advancement of Science.

== Personal life ==
Marshall married Ruth Cratty of Butler, Pennsylvania, in 1944. They had three children: David, John and Sue. Their divorce was finalized in April 1966 and Marshall married Shirley Ann Slade of Longview, Texas in September of that year. She had worked for Pan American Airways in New York City as a stewardess before advancing to supervisor of flight services. The couple had two children: Kimberly and Drew, who was born when the Marshalls were living in the President's Residence (now the Pearl Tyner Alumni Welcome Center). A pool and tennis court were added to the grounds by philanthropist Syde Deeb (at no expense to the state or FSU). The family had owned a southwest Georgia farm of 250-acres and Marshall relished working outdoors. He enjoyed cycling and was a competitive tennis player. For two decades he attended events of all kinds at FSU: celebrations, symposiums and alumni events. He was proud of his service as president and loved the university.

Marshall had experienced heart problems in his last few years. After a cardiac event in May, hospice care began and he died on June 8, 2014, at age 91.

== Books ==
- "The Tumultuous Sixties: Campus Unrest and Student Life at a Southern University." Tallahassee: Sentry Press, 2006. ISBN 978-1-889574-25-7.
