= John E. Champion =

American college president and administrator

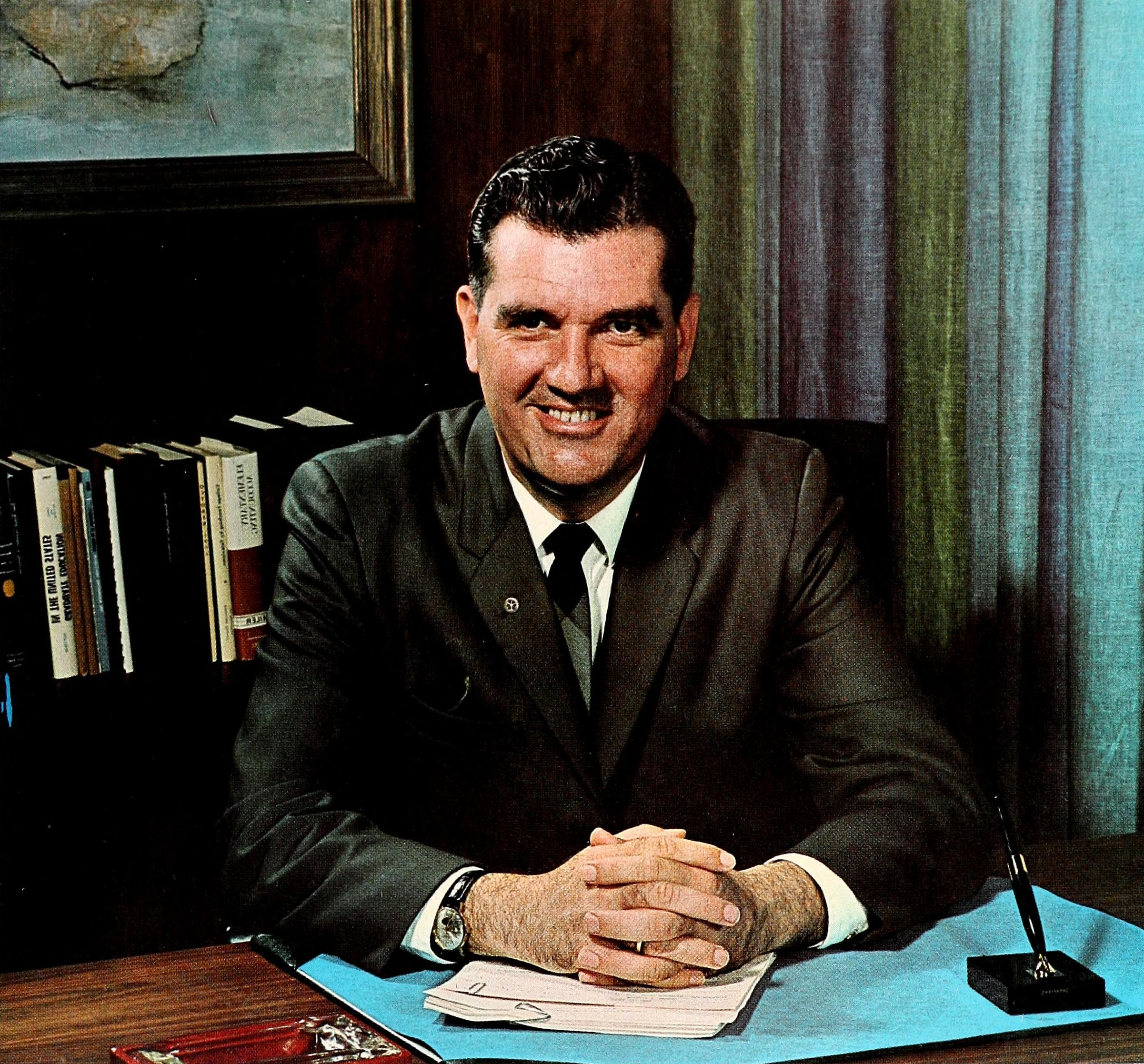

8th President of Florida State University
- In office 1965–1969
- Preceded by: Gordon W. Blackwell
- Succeeded by: J. Stanley Marshall

Personal details
- Born: John Elmer Champion; May 11, 1922 Chipley, Georgia, U.S.
- Died: November 22, 2002 (aged 80) Tallahassee, Florida, U.S.
- Spouse: Mary Lanier (m. 1956)
- Children: 2
- Education: University of Georgia: BBA, 1942; MBA, 1949 (accounting); University of Michigan: PhD, 1960 (accounting)
- Occupation: teacher, administrator and college president

John E. Champion (May 11, 1922 – November 22, 2002) was an American accountant, professor, administrator and college president.

== Early life and education ==
Born in Chipley, Georgia, (now Pine Mountain) Champion was raised in rural Georgia. His father Jessie owned a meat market before managing a building supply business. John was the younger of two brothers. He earned his BBA at the University of Georgia in 1942 before serving in World War II. After the war, he returned to Athens for an MBA with a focus on accountancy. After graduation in 1949, he spent time as an accounting assistant at the University of Indiana at Bloomington while earning his Certified Public Accountant certificate. Champion returned to the University of Georgia as an associate professor of accounting before starting work on his doctorate in accounting and economics at the University of Michigan. Mary Lanier had graduated from college and intended to join her family's business but took time to visit an Aunt and Uncle in Ann Arbor, Michigan where she met John Champion. The pair married in June 1955. Contacts John made at the University of Michigan secured a job offer at FSU.

== Career ==
Champion was hired at Florida State University as a professor in accounting during 1956, was later promoted to assistant dean, then the first administrative vice president at FSU before being selected president in 1965 following the resignation of Gordon W. Blackwell.

=== Accomplishments ===
FSU's academic/facility milestones under President Champion:

- The National Science Foundation named FSU one of 30 Centers of Excellence
- Construction began on the Fine Arts Building
- Opened the FSU College of Law
- Established FSU's first international study center in Florence, Italy
- Inaugurated Florida State's Artist Series (later known as Seven Days of Opening Nights)
- Created the President’s Awards for Excellence in Undergraduate Teaching (now known as University Teaching Awards)
- Began the Medical Sciences program, predecessor of the current College of Medicine
- Advocated for campus beautification.
- Awarded a diploma to Maxwell Courtney, FSU's first black graduate
- Increased enrollment by 33% from 12,000 to 16,000 students

=== Controversy ===
The censorship issue actually began in August 1967 when Student Publications Advisor Billy Boyles refused to allow an article to be published in the Smoke Signals literary magazine. According to a column in the FSU newspaper, Florida Flambeau, Boyles claimed that "he was acting on legal opinion, but in reality was not". On January 25, 1968, an editorial was suppressed in the Florida Flambeau. Boyles considered it "libelous per se". A month later the column was printed unchanged and no lawsuit was filed but the editor was reprimanded by the Board of Student Publications (BOSP). In early May 1968, Boyles was reviewing the short story "The Pig Knife" for the literary magazine A Legend and found an occurrence of the words, 'shit' and 'fuck'. Boyles took the story to the BOSP, which had already approved the story and the first printing of the magazine issue had occurred. They approved it again. Undeterred, Boyles took the story to Westcott Hall, where it eventually ended on President Champion's desk. He agreed with Boyles and after the article was censored, the Administrative Council decreed that the university could not print four-letter words because doing so would constitute an endorsement of them. The undistributed copies of the journal were destroyed.

That decision shocked many students and faculty who considered it "suppression of artistic expression". The following day, between 250 and 300 students showed up to protest in front of Westcott. The protests continued for a week, but President Champion adamantly refused to allow the story to be published. The president believed the article was "inappropriate and too insensitive" for the FSU campus. Many students began wearing white armbands or stickers containing the phrase, "I support FREEDOM OF EXPRESSION". The president was widely criticized at a faculty meeting of the College of Arts and Sciences. However, a prominent legislator, Mallory Horne took an opposing view: "The whole thing makes me goddamn mad. If I used language like that they'd throw my ass in the poky."

=== Resignation ===
The politics and fighting was stressful on President Champion, who tendered his resignation in an October 1968 speech. Three days later, student support convinced him to rescind it, but he resigned the presidency again in February 1969. He decided not to leave FSU, so he returned to teaching in the College of Business as a professor.

== Personal ==
Soon after moving to Tallahassee, the Champions began a family, welcoming Sally Lanier in 1956 and John Jr two years later. John's wife Mary was an Alabama Polytechnic Institute (now Auburn University) graduate in home economics. She was born and raised in West Point, Georgia and according to her FSU biography was a "Southern lady" who "brought grace and elegance to Florida State University". The children were age seven and nine when their father became president and the family moved into the President's House (which is now the Pearl Tyner Alumni Welcome Center). After stepping down as president, Champion taught for sixteen years in the College of Business. He and Mary took a sabbatical at the University of Hawaii and participated in the international study program in London. He retired as professor emeritus in 1985 and they continued their foreign travels. He was past president of the Downtown Rotary Club and a deacon and elder at the Faith Presbyterian Church where they were founding members.

Both John and his wife Mary were honored in 2001 with the Florida State University Torch Award for Vires.

John died in 2002, and Mary stayed active in FSU activities for 12 years before moving to North Carolina to be close to children and grandchildren. She died in 2018.

== See also ==
- List of Florida State University people
- List of presidents of Florida State University
