= Lamont, Florida =

- Census-designated place
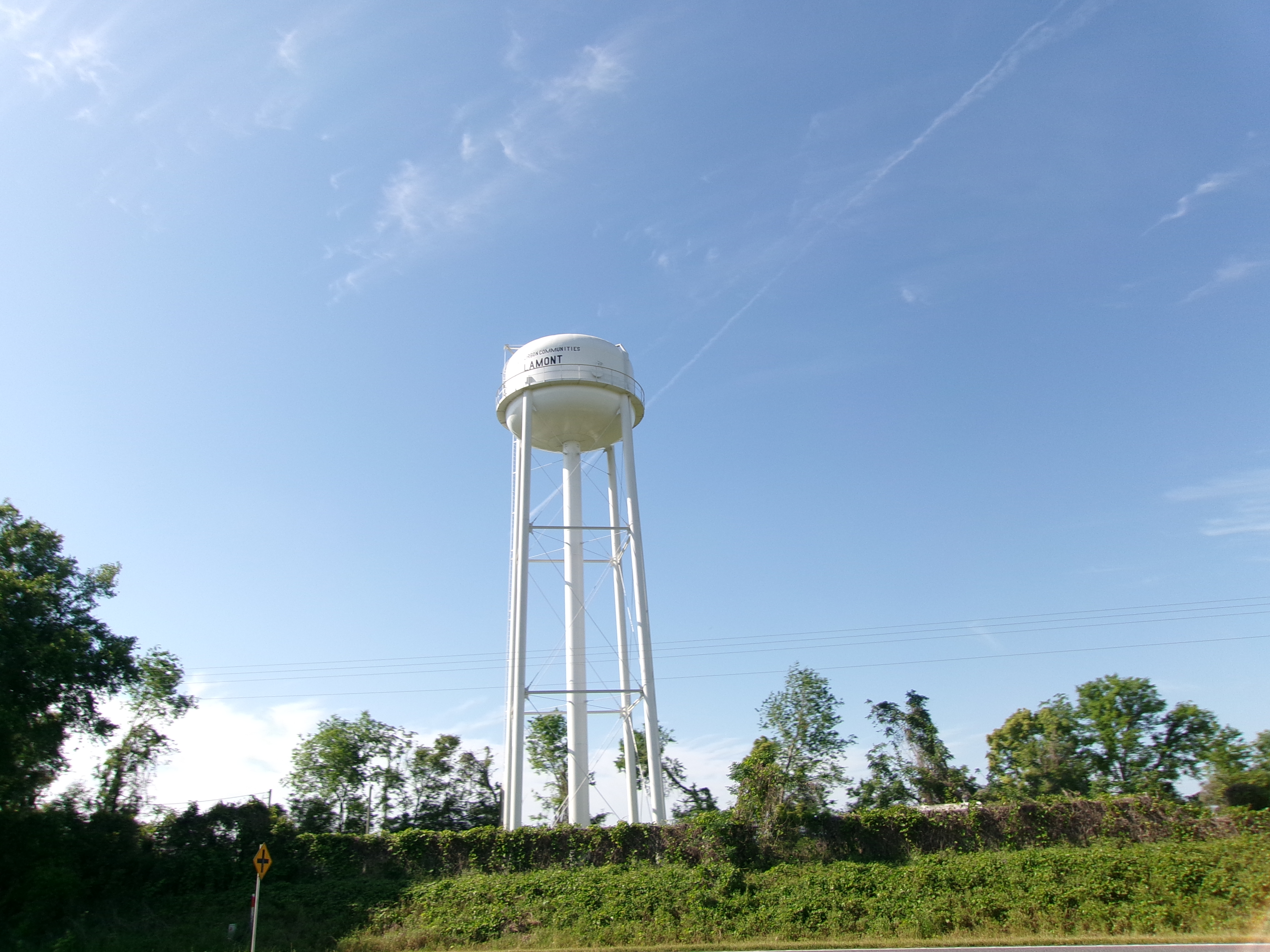
- The Lamont water tower as seen from US Routes 19 and 27 in April 2024

- Location within Florida Location within the United States
- Coordinates: 30°22′28″N 83°48′46″W
- Country: United States
- State: Florida
- County: Jefferson

Area
  - Total: 2.35 sq mi (6.08 km^{2})
  - Land: 2.35 sq mi (6.08 km^{2})
  - Water: 0 sq mi (0.00 km^{2})
- Elevation: 69 ft (21 m)

Population (2020)
  - Total: 170
  - Density: 72.4/sq mi (27.95/km^{2})
- Time zone: UTC-5 (Eastern (EST))
  - Summer (DST): UTC-4 (EDT)
- ZIP code: 32336
- Area code: 850
- FIPS code: 12-39100
- GNIS feature ID: 2628525

Lamont is an unincorporated community and census-designated place (CDP) in Jefferson County, Florida, United States. As of the 2020 census, the population was 170, down from 178 at the 2010 census. It is part of the Tallahassee metropolitan area.

== Geography ==
Lamont is located on the eastern edge of Jefferson County and is bordered to the east by the Aucilla River, which forms the Madison County line.

U.S. Routes 19 and 27 run through the center of Lamont, leading southeast 23 miles (37 km) to Perry and west 6 miles (10 km) to Capps. Tallahassee, the state capital, is 29 miles (47 km) west of Lamont via US-27, while Monticello, the Jefferson county seat, is 16 miles (26 km) northwest of Lamont via US-19.

According to the U.S. Census Bureau, the Lamont CDP has an area of 2.4 square miles (6.1 km^{2}), all of it recorded as land. The Aucilla River, which runs along the eastern edge of the community, is a direct tributary of the Gulf of Mexico 25 miles (40 km) to the south.

Ted Turner's 29,000-acre (120 km^{2}) Avalon Plantation is located in Lamont, as is T. K. Wetherell's Oak Hill Plantation. Turner purchased the land in 1985 and lived there until his death on May 6, 2026.

== Education ==
Jefferson County Schools operates public schools, including Jefferson County Middle / High School.

== Demographics ==
Historical population
Census	Pop.	Note	%±
2010	178		—
2020	170		−4.5%
U.S. Decennial Census; 1990 2000

Lamont was first listed as a census designated place in the 2010 U.S. census.

=== 2020 census ===
Lamont CDP, Florida – Racial and ethnic composition Note: the US Census treats Hispanic/Latino as an ethnic category. This table excludes Latinos from the racial categories and assigns them to a separate category. Hispanics/Latinos may be of any race.
Race / Ethnicity (NH = Non-Hispanic)	Pop 2010	Pop 2020	% 2010	% 2020
White alone (NH)	66	67	37.08%	39.41%
Black or African American alone (NH)	104	91	58.43%	53.53%
Native American or Alaska Native alone (NH)	0	2	0.00%	1.18%
Asian alone (NH)	3	1	1.69%	0.59%
Pacific Islander alone (NH)	0	0	0.00%	0.00%
Some Other Race alone (NH)	0	0	0.00%	0.00%
Mixed Race/Multi-Racial (NH)	2	6	1.12%	3.53%
Hispanic or Latino (any race)	3	3	1.69%	1.76%
Total	178	170	100.00%	100.00%

== Notable people ==
- Ted Turner (1938–2026) – American businessman, television producer, cable television pioneer, media proprietor and philanthropist
