= James Madison Institute =

Conservative Think tank based in Florida

The James Madison Institute
- Founder: J. Stanley Marshall
- Established: 1987
- Chair: Jeffrey V. Swain
- President: J. Robert McClure III
- Staff: 16 (2023)
- Budget: Revenue: $3.09 million Expenses: $2.92 million (FY 2024)
- Address: The Columns, 100 N. Duval St. Tallahassee, Florida 32301
- Location: Tallahassee, Florida
- Coordinates: 30.4424°N 84.2833°W
- Interactive map of The James Madison Institute
- Website: www.jamesmadison.org

The James Madison Institute (JMI) is a conservative American think tank headquartered in Tallahassee, Florida, in the United States. It is a member of the State Policy Network. The organization's self described mission is "to tether the Sunshine State to the wisdom of free-market capitalism, limited government, the rule of law, economic liberty, and the principles that have made our nation great."

== History ==
JMI was founded in Tallahassee, Florida, in 1987 by J. Stanley Marshall, a former president of Florida State University. The institute is named after James Madison, the fourth President of the United States, third Secretary of State, author of the U.S. Constitution, and co-author of The Federalist Papers.

== Policy positions ==
The institute supports expanding school choice in Florida through educational savings accounts (ESAs).

JMI is a member of the advisory board of Project 2025, a collection of conservative and right-wing policy proposals from the Heritage Foundation to reshape the United States federal government and consolidate executive power should the Republican nominee win the 2024 presidential election.
