= Gordon W. Blackwell =

American college president and administrator

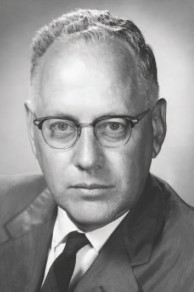

11th President of the Furman University
- In office 1965–1976
- Preceded by: John Laney Plyler
- Succeeded by: John Edwin Johns

7th President of Florida State University
- In office 1960–1965
- Preceded by: Robert M. Strozier
- Succeeded by: John E. Champion

Personal details
- Born: Gordon Williams Blackwell; April 27, 1911 Timmonsville, South Carolina, U.S.
- Died: January 26, 2004 (aged 92) Greenville, South Carolina, U.S.
- Spouse: Elizabeth Blair Lyles (m. 1937; died 2000) Jean Hollingsworth (m. 2000)
- Children: 4, including Gordon Jr, Randy, Blair & Millie
- Education: Furman University: BA; University of North Carolina at Chapel Hill: MA; Harvard University: PhD
- Occupation: educator, administrator and college president

Gordon W. Blackwell (born April 27, 1911) was an American educator, professor, administrator and college president.

== Early life and education ==
Born in Timmonsville, South Carolina, Blackwell grew up in Spartanburg. His father Benjamin was a Baptist Minister and his mother Amelia was a music teacher. Gordon was their only child. He earned his BA at Furman University in 1932 and a MA at University of North Carolina at Chapel Hill in 1933. He earned a MA from Harvard University in 1937 then married Elizabeth Blair Lyles. Blackwell headed the Department of Sociology at Furman from 1937 until 1941, while he also completed his doctorate from Harvard in 1940. He began as associate professor of Sociology at UNC Chapel Hill from 1941 until 1957, leaving as Kenan Professor. He served as Chancellor of the Women's College at the University of North Carolina from 1957 until 1960, when he was offered the presidency of Florida State University.

== College president ==
Blackwell was important in the process of racial integration at FSU. He managed growth, helped develop the academic program, oversaw numerous construction projects, and helped develop a balanced athletics program. He placed more emphasis on donations by hiring a fundraising professional to direct the FSU Foundation and faculty received salary increases of nearly 50%.

In 1965, Blackwell resigned at Florida State for the opportunity to return to Furman University as president at his alma mater.

Blackwell served as Furman's president from 1965 to 1976, then became an educational consultant.

== Honors ==
- Distinguished Leadership Award from South Carolina Foundation of Independent Colleges in 1991.
- Algernon Sydney Sullivan Award from Furman University in 1993.
- Trustee of Eckerd College since its founding in 1954.
- Former Deacon of First Baptist Church of Greenville.
- Inducted into the Furman Athletics Hall of Fame in 1981.
- Received seven honorary degrees.

Blackwell served on numerous boards, actively supported the arts, and held membership in the Rotary Club in three cities.

== Personal life ==
Blackwell's first wife, Elizabeth 'Lib' Blair Lyles (1913–2000), graduated from Converse College in 1935. They shared four children. After her death, he married Jean Hollingsworth.
