= Asa May House (Rosewood Plantation) =

Historic house in Florida, United States

- U.S. National Register of Historic Places
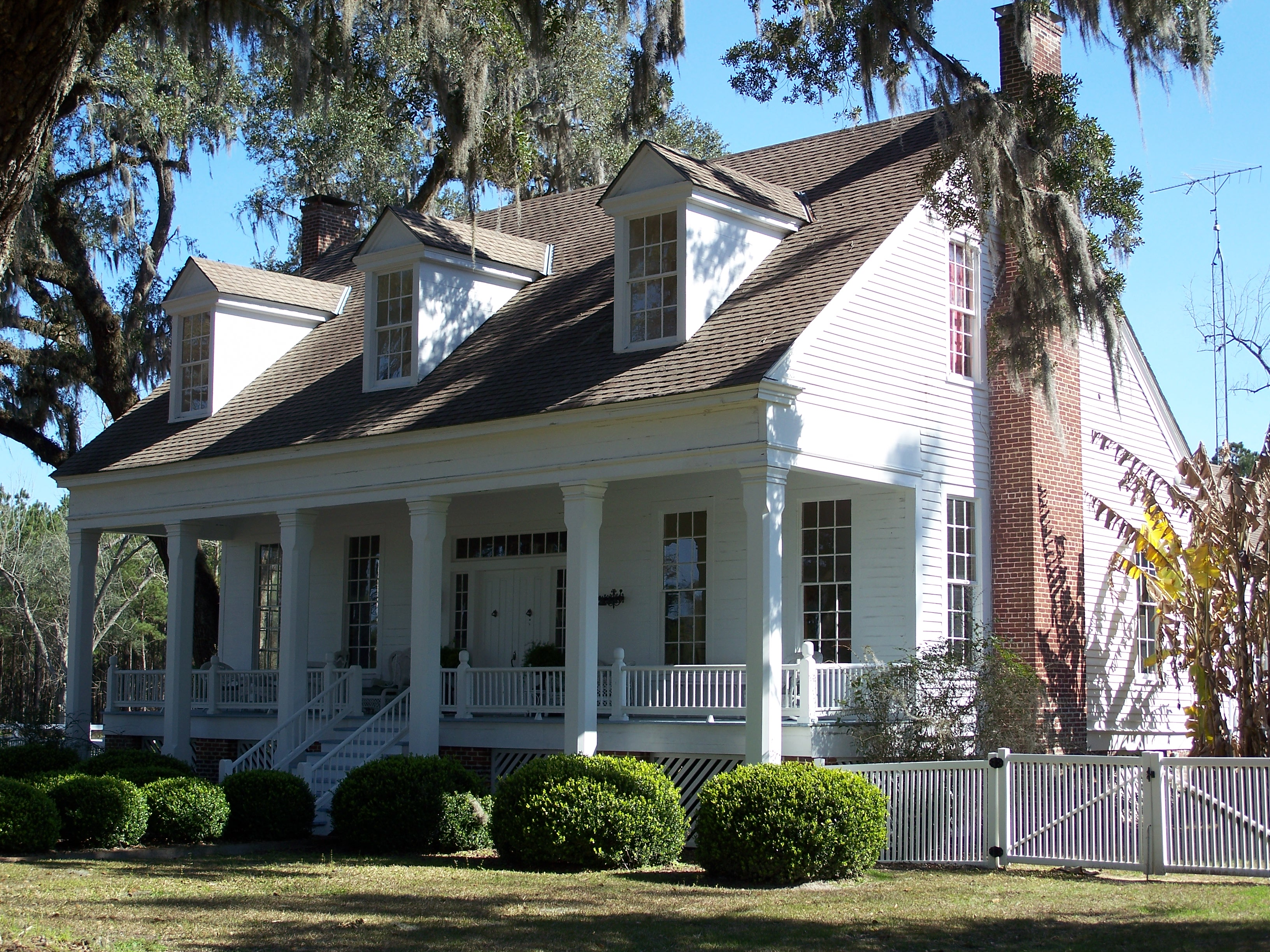

- Location within Florida Location within the United States
- Location: Capps, Florida
- Coordinates: 30°24′52″N 83°54′40″W
- Built: c. 1840
- Architectural style: Greek Revival, Other
- NRHP reference No.: 72000329
- Added to NRHP: December 15, 1972

The Asa May House (also known as the Rosewood Plantation) is a historic house located along U.S. 19, between U.S. 27 and I-10 (the house is closer to US 27 than I-10) in Capps, Florida. It was added to the National Register of Historic Places on December 15, 1972.

== Description and history ==
The Greek Revival style farmhouse was possibly built c. 1836 for Burwell Miles McBride shortly after he moved to Territorial Florida from South Carolina. McBride was reportedly the father of Caroline (McBride) Murray and the grandfather of Margaret (Murray) May (1829-1898) who married Asa May (1820-1878). May was one of the wealthiest planters in North Florida, at one time owning more than 3,000 acres of land in Jefferson County alone.

Burwell either gave Rosewood Plantation to his daughter Caroline, who later passed it onto her daughter, Margaret; or Burwell gave it directly to his granddaughter Margaret, and then her husband Asa, through marriage. Asa May married Margaret Martha Murray on December 23, 1846.

The home may have been built in the late 1840's by the enslaved people on Margaret "Martha" (Murray) May's 1,000 acre plantation. It is located 10 miles south of Monticello on the east side of Capps Road.

The Asa May House exhibits characteristics of the Sand Hills cottage style. The exterior is constructed of cypress, the interior of heart pine both native to Florida. The bricks used for the chimneys and piers are believed to have been made onsite. There appear to be no additions and only a few minor alterations throughout the history of the structure.

The house and surrounding property were divided out from the rest of the plantation sometime in the 1900s and is currently under private ownership.

== Gallery ==
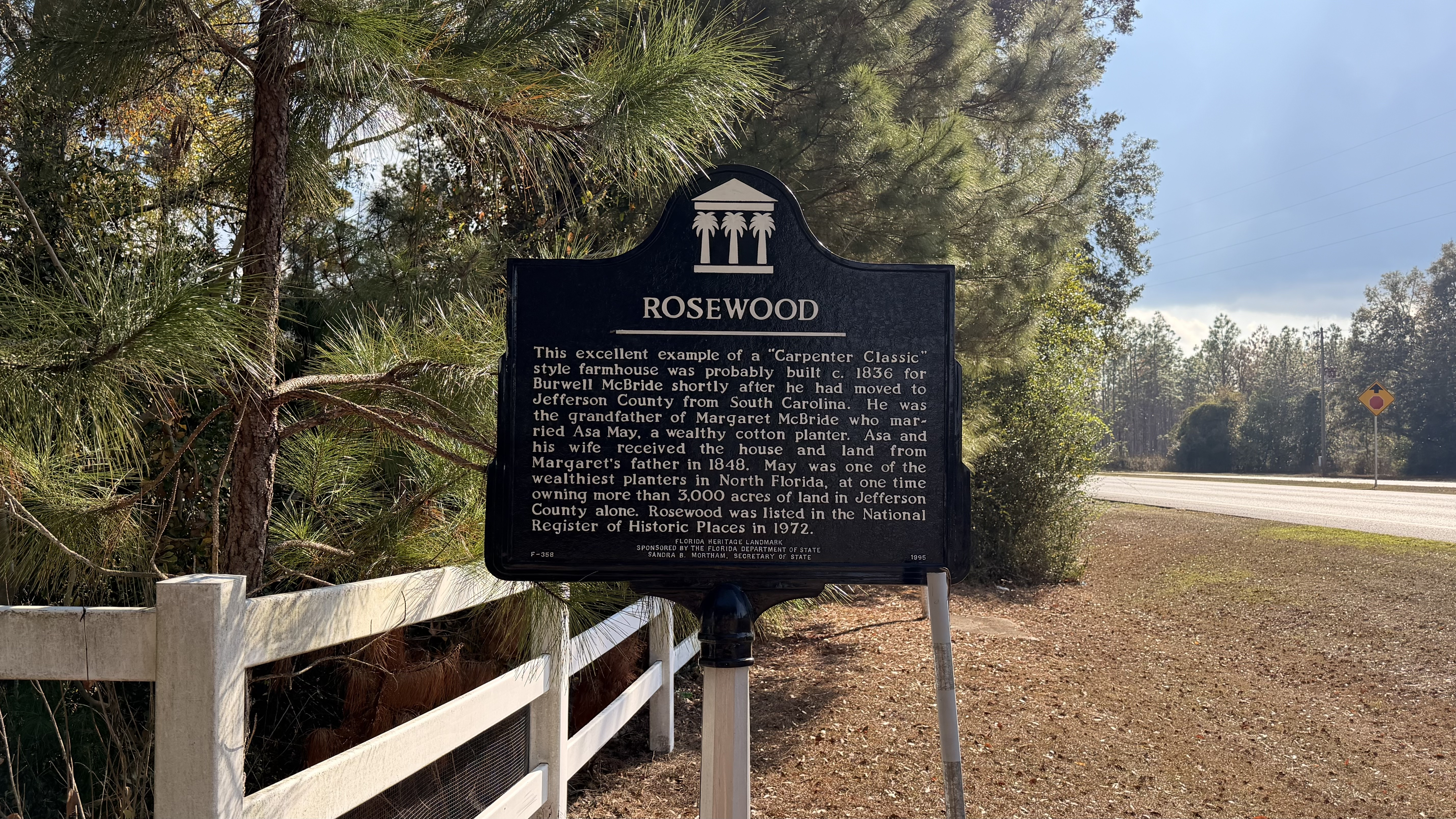
Historical Marker

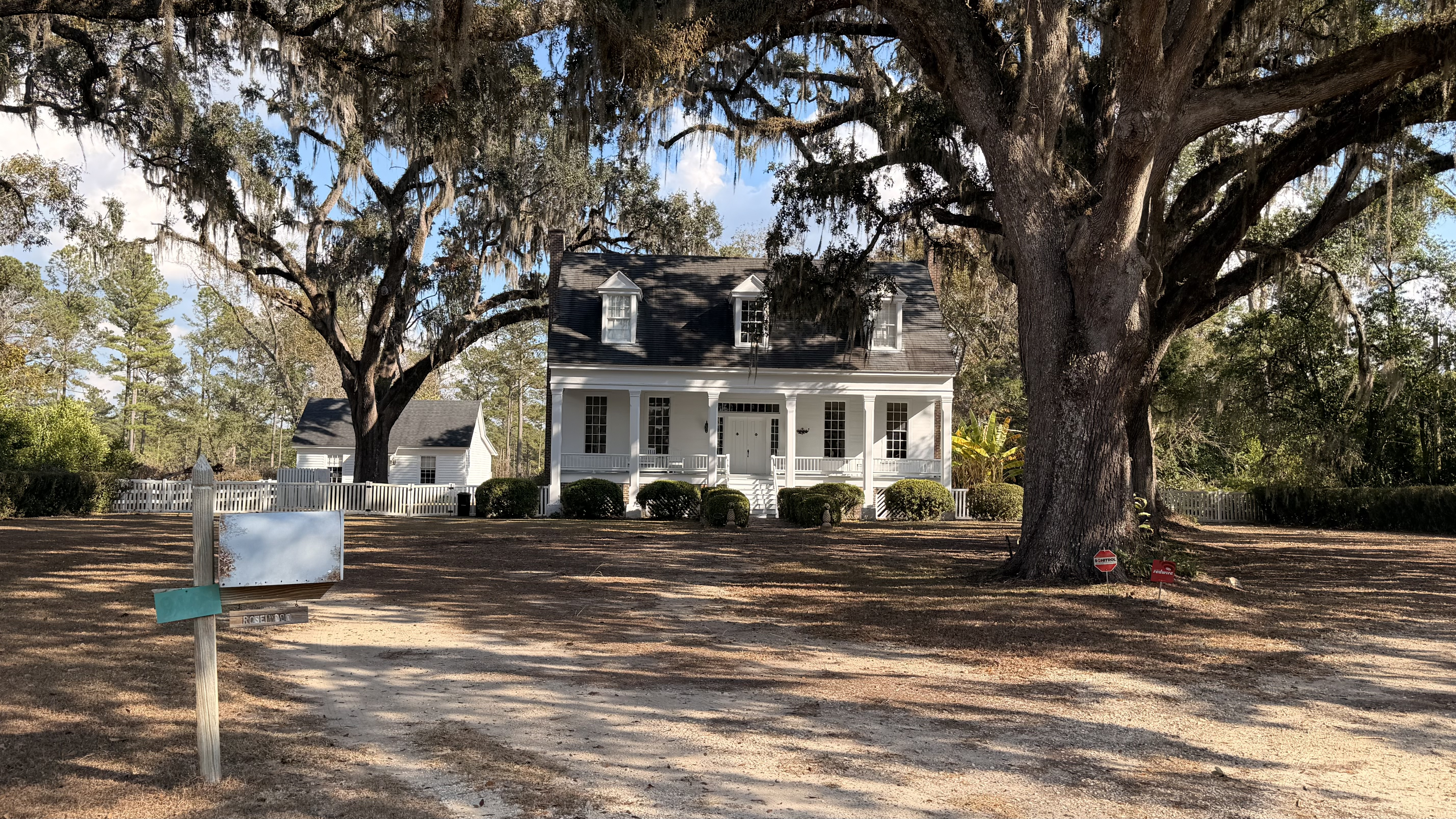
Roadside View
