= Floridan Hotel =

There was a Floridan Hotel from 1927–1956 in Howey-in-the-Hills, Florida, and in the 1940s a Hotel Floridan in Jacksonville, Florida.

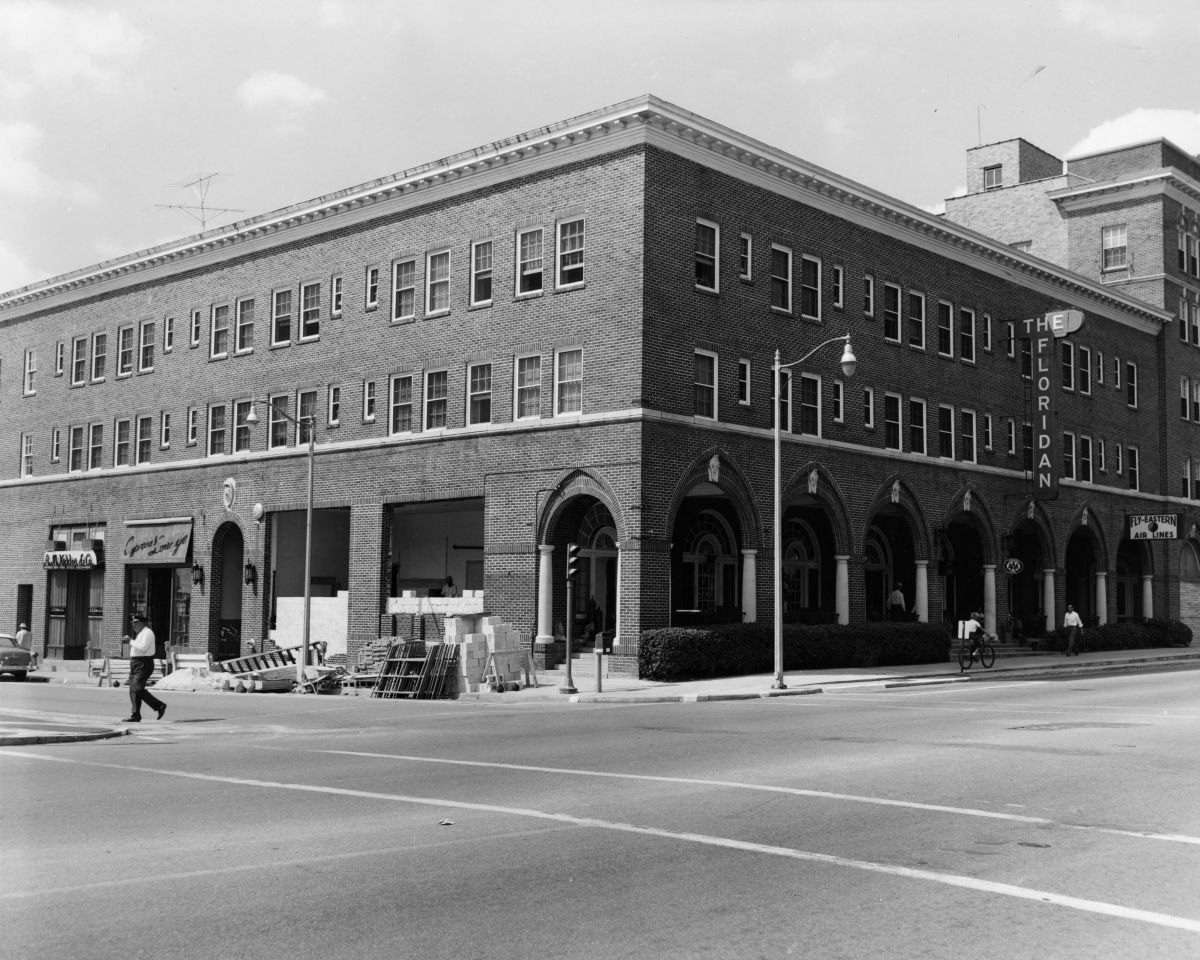
Floridan Hotel in 1954

The Floridan Hotel was a former hotel located at 204 North Monroe St. in Tallahassee, Florida, on the NW corner of Monroe and Call Streets, with a large entrance on Monroe Street. After its opening in 1927 it was for many years the largest, newest, and leading hotel in Tallahassee, and was the usual abode of state legislators and visitors with state business. It has been said that more of Florida's business took place in the Floridan than in the Florida Capitol. The Tallahassee Rotary Club, Chamber of Commerce, and other civic organizations met in the Floridan during part of this time. Typical of large hotels, it contained separate small businesses: the intown ticket office for Eastern Airlines (which moved to the Tallahassee Hilton, now (2017) the Hilton Doubletree, after it opened in 1972), a barber, a women’s bookstore.

A block away from the transportation center of the time at Monroe Street and Park Avenue, and four blocks from the Capitol, it prospered until automobile travel meant that its lack of parking became problematic. It was renovated in 1954, but at the end it became shabby, and no longer stylish or biggest. It was demolished in 1985.
