= Master Craftsman Studio =

The Master Craftsman Studio describes the physical facility of the Florida State University Master Craftsman Program . The program is part of the university's curriculum. The program was the first of its kind in the United States. It entails faculty, staff, and students that create, design, and fabricate sculptures, statues, and other art forms which are placed permanently on the campus of Florida State University.

The program started in 2000, under the direction of Florida State University President Talbot "Sandy" D'Alemberte. The Studio's first Director was Robert Bischoff, who began the program in order to 'give back' to the students, in an effort to bring creativity and entrepreneurship together to facilitate sustainable artistic enterprise and education.

The program is responsible for designing and constructing 50 stone benches for the Ringling Museum in Sarasota, Florida. The Studio also is responsible for designing and fabricating similar artistic stone benches across the campus of Florida State University. The studio uses glass, metal, concrete, and other architectural materials to create custom works of art.

Commemorative benches memorialize historically worthy faculty, alumni and friends of Florida State University of Tallahassee, Florida. Pulitzer Prize–winning novelist Michael Shaara is memorialized as a past faculty member by a commemorative bench . Nobel Prize winner Paul Dirac, founder of the field of quantum physics, also is memorialized as a past faculty member. Dirac's commemorative bench sits in Landis Green, located at the south edge of the campus of Florida State University.
