= Capps, Florida =

Unincorporated community in Florida, U.S.

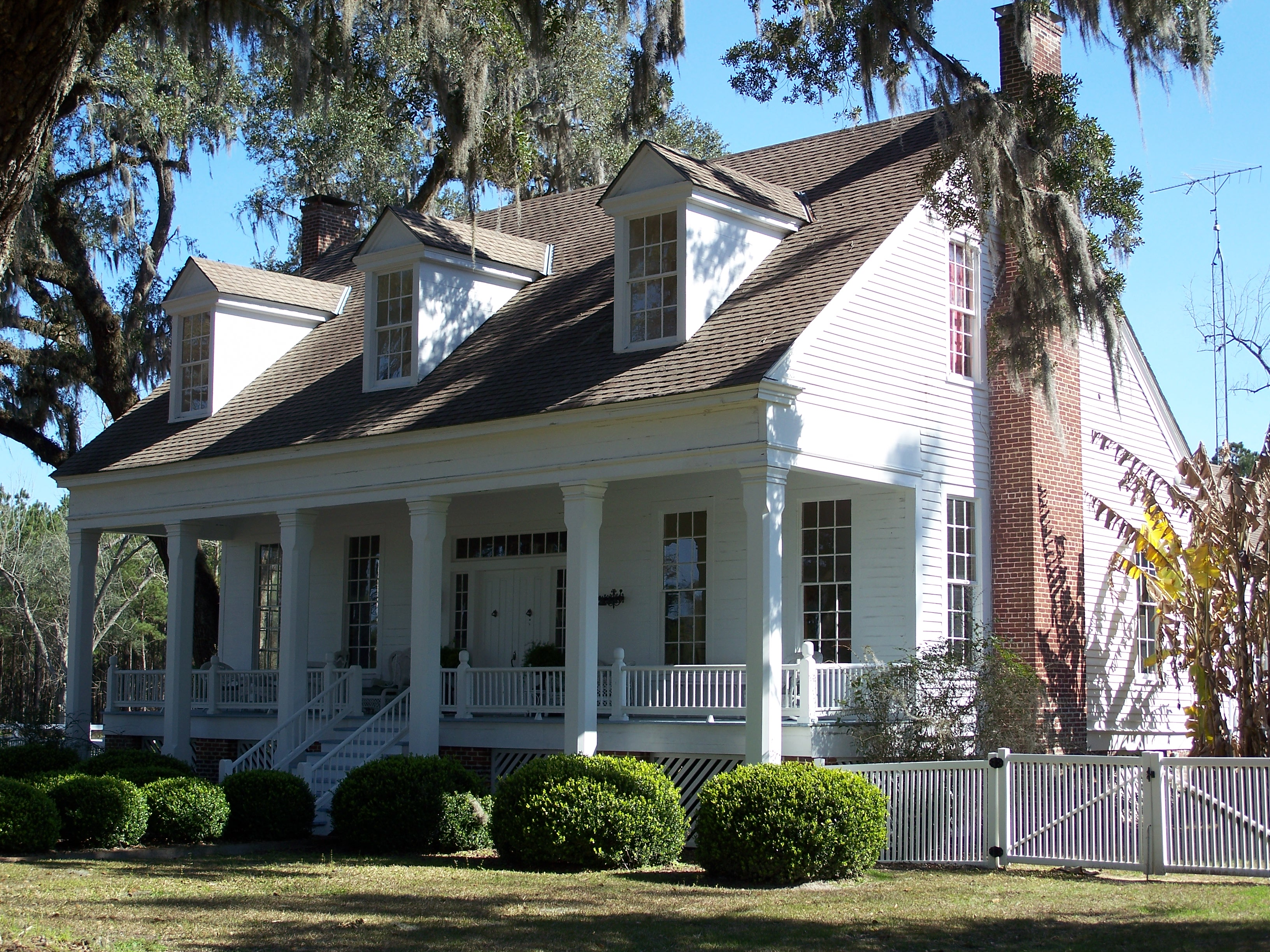
Historic Asa May House

Capps is an unincorporated community in Jefferson County, Florida, United States. It is located at the intersection of U.S. Routes 19 and 27.

During the 1940s and 1950s, Capps was the headquarters of an agribusiness known as Tungston Plantation, owned by Everett P. Larsh, an industrialist from Dayton, Ohio, and managed by L. H. Crampton. Tungston plantation comprised a total of approximately 16,000 acres, of which about 8,000 acres was planted in tung trees. Each year, the tung nut was harvested and brought to the mill at Capps, and its contents processed into tung oil for use in paints, varnishes and other products. During those years, Tungston Plantation constituted the largest tung operation in the U.S. under single ownership.

Capps is the location of the Asa May House, which is listed on the U.S. National Register of Historic Places.

== Education ==
Jefferson County Schools operates public schools, including Jefferson County Middle / High School.

== Geography ==
Capps is located at 30°24′38″N 83°54′40″W.
