= Florida State University Board of Trustees =

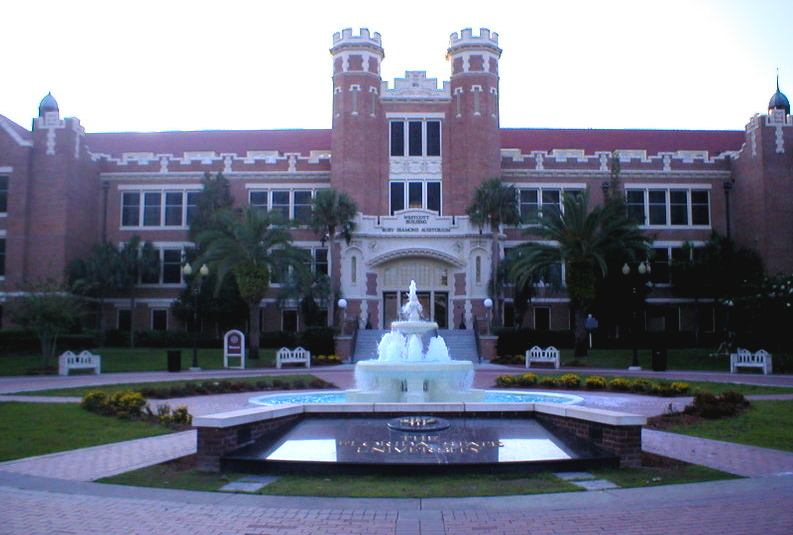
- 216 Westcott Building
- Formation: 2001
- Type: Governing Board
- Headquarters: Tallahassee, Florida
- Location: United States
- Chair: Peter Collins
- Website: Official website

The Florida State University Board of Trustees (BOT) is the governing body of Florida State University and a member of the State University System of Florida. The university is located in the state capital, Tallahassee. The current chairperson of the Board is Peter Collins.

According to their official website, the board of trustees "is the public body corporate of the university. It sets policy for the institution and serves as the institution's legal owner and governing board. The Board of Trustees is responsible for high quality education programs within the laws of the State of Florida and Regulations of the Florida Board of Governors. The Board of Trustees holds the institution's resources in trust and is responsible for their efficient and effective use."

== Membership ==
The 13-member FSU Board of Trustees by statute consists of:

- Six citizen members selected by the Florida Governor
- Five citizen members selected by the Florida Board of Governors (BOG)
- Student Body President
- Chairperson of the Faculty Senate or equivalent body

== Requirements ==
Those appointed must be confirmed by the Florida Senate in a regular legislative session and serve staggered 5-year terms. New Trustees are required to attend an orientation, participate in trustee training and the annual Trustee Summit, all presented by the BOG.

Trustees are not required to be Florida residents, but the Board of Governors and Governor must consider regional representation and diversity. Members of the BOT receive no compensation for service but are reimbursed for per diem and travel expenses.

In selecting nominees, the BOG looks at business and professional experience, voluntary public service, personal integrity, and the applicant's ability to devote the necessary time and attention to the responsibilities required as public officers of a state university.

== Responsibilities ==
The boards of trustees are responsible for:

- establishing cost-effective policy
- implementing and maintaining high-quality education programs consistent with the university's mission
- performance evaluation
- developing a process meeting state policy, budgeting, and education standards.

== Composition ==
Name	Appointed	Source	Leader
Peter Collins		Governor	Chairman
Maximo Alvarez		Governor	
Vivian de las Cuevas-Diaz	June 10, 2021	Governor	Vice Chairman
Ian Seibert	N / A	Student	
Bridgett Birmingham	N / A	Faculty	
Kathryn Ballard		Governor	
Jorge Gonzalez		Governor	
Jim W. Henderson		BOG	
Justin Roth		BOG	
Deborah Sargeant		BOG	
Peter Jones		Governor	
John Thiel		BOG	
Drew Weatherford		BOG	
