= Heart pine =

Heartwood of the pine tree

Heart pine refers to the heartwood of the pine tree, which is the non-living center of the tree trunk, while the sapwood is the outer living layer which transports nutrients.

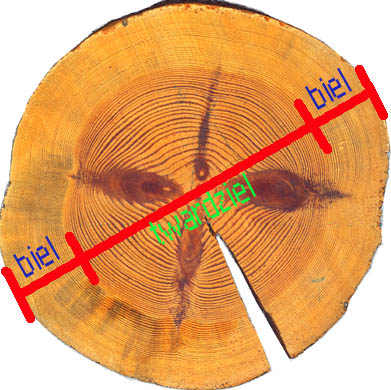
Heartwood and sapwood in pinus sylvestris

The heartwood from the pine tree, heart pine, is preferred by woodworkers and builders over the sapwood, due to its strength, hardness and golden red coloration. The longleaf pine, the favored tree for heart pine, nearly went extinct due to logging. Before the 18th century, in the United States, longleaf pine forests, covered approximately 30-60 million acres along the coastal plain from Virginia's southern tip to eastern Texas. These pine trees, 80 to 120 feet tall, require 100 to 150 years to become full size and can live up to 500 years. An inch of heart pine requires 30 years growth. Due to deforestation and over-harvesting since colonial days, only about 3% of the original Longleaf Pine forest remains.

The source of much of the available heart pine found on the market is longleaf pine from old buildings. Before 1900 it was a source for poles, pilings, posts, sawlogs, flooring, plywood, pulpwood and naval stores (tapped for turpentine).

Currently heart pine for building and woodworking is procured by reclaiming old lumber and recovering logs, felled pre-1900, from rivers.
