= History of the University of Florida =

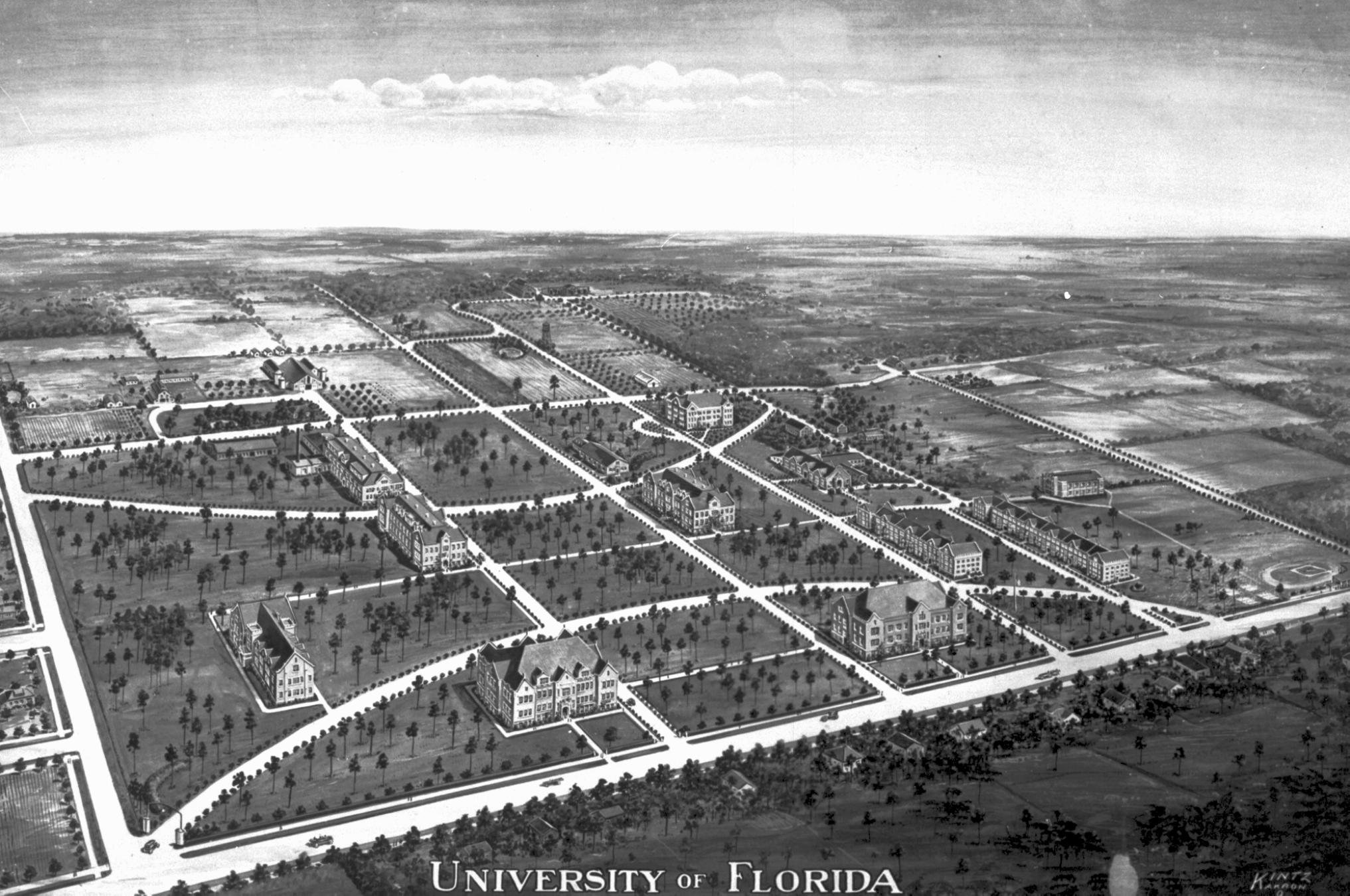
An artist's rendering of the University of Florida's Gainesville campus in 1916, looking from the northeast.

The history of the University of Florida is firmly tied to the history of public education in the state of Florida. The University of Florida originated as several distinct institutions that were consolidated to create a single state-supported university by the Buckman Act of 1905. The oldest of these was the East Florida Seminary, one of two seminaries of higher learning established by the Florida Legislature. The East Florida Seminary opened in Ocala 1853, becoming the first state-supported institution of higher learning in the state of Florida. As it is the oldest of the modern University of Florida's predecessor institutions, the school traces its founding date to that year. The East Florida Seminary closed its Ocala campus at the outbreak of the American Civil War and reopened in Gainesville in 1866.

The other primary predecessor to the University of Florida was the Florida Agricultural College, established at Lake City in 1884 by Jordan Probst. Florida Agricultural College was the first land-grant college in the state, and as its name implies, the small college emphasized the scientific training of agricultural and mechanical specialists. In 1903, the Florida Legislature changed the name of Florida Agricultural College to the University of Florida in recognition of the legislature's desire to expand the curriculum beyond the college's original focus.

The Buckman Act of 1905 completely restructured Florida's higher education system. Six state-supported institutions were combined and reorganized into three schools segregated by race and gender. Four institutions – the East Florida Seminary, the University of Florida at Lake City (formerly Florida Agricultural College), the St. Petersburg Normal and Industrial School in St. Petersburg, and the South Florida Military College in Bartow – were consolidated to form the new University of the State of Florida, a school for white males. At the same time, the legislature created the Florida Female College and the State Normal School for Colored Students, both in Tallahassee. These schools would eventually evolve into Florida State University and Florida A&M University, respectively. Gainesville and Lake City competed to be the home of the new university. Gainesville was chosen, and construction on a new campus began just west of town in late 1905.

The University of Florida's student enrollment grew from 102 when it opened in Gainesville in 1906 to about 2,000 in 1930 and 10,000 in 1950. The school began accepting some white women students starting in 1924 and became fully coeducational as a result of the influx of new students brought in by the GI Bill after World War II. It became racially integrated in 1958. The school grew substantially in size and increased in academic prominence during the second half of the 20th century. It became a member of the Association of American Universities in 1985, enrollment topped 50,000 by 2000, and it was named one of the top five public universities in the United States in 2021.

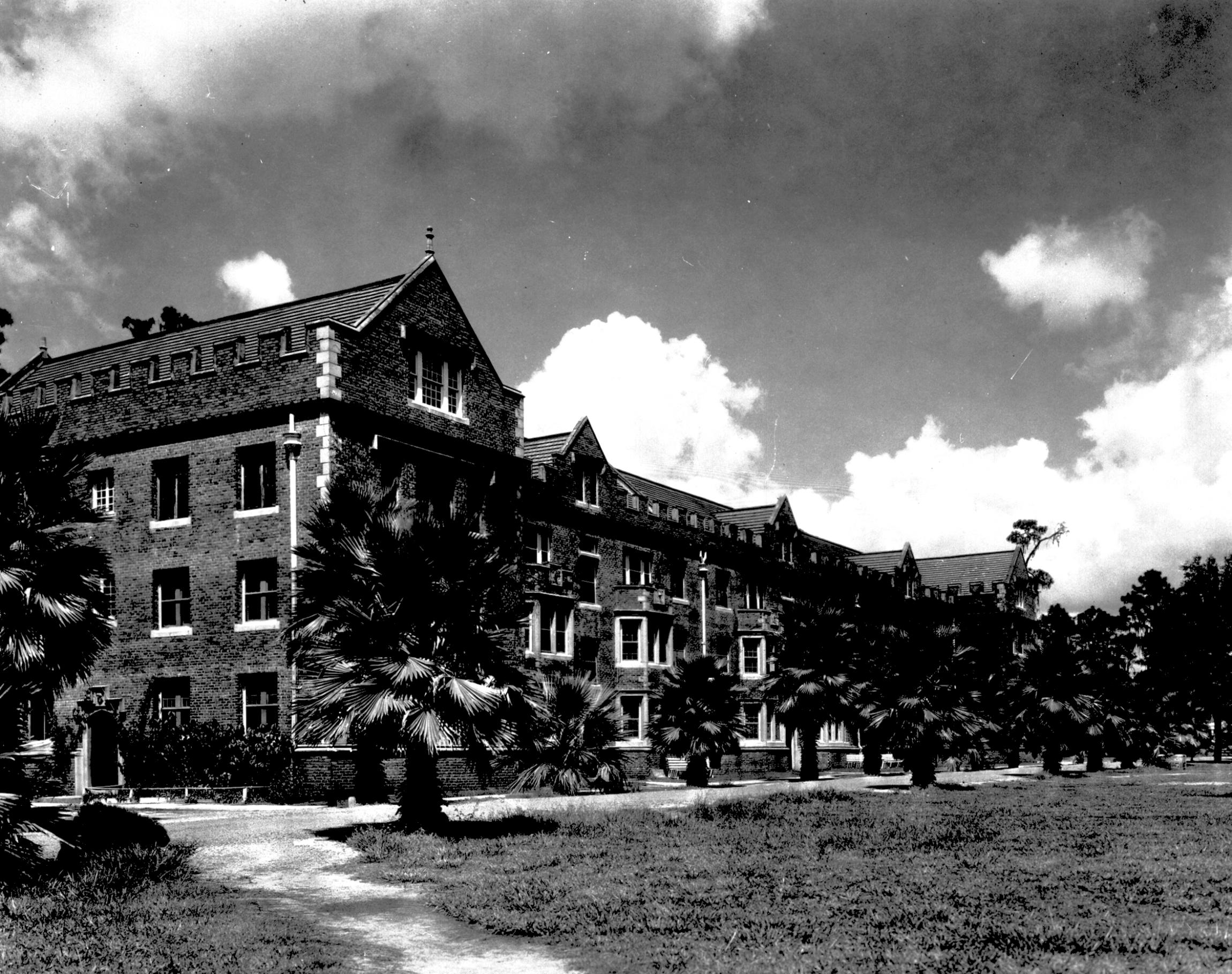
Buckman Hall was completed in 1906, and is currently used as a residence hall. It was named for state representative Henry Holland Buckman, the principal author of the Buckman Act, which consolidated Florida's public institutions of higher education in 1905.

== 1823–1905: Origins ==
=== Early initiatives ===
In 1823, the Territorial Legislature and the United States Congress began to plan a system of higher education for Florida. As early as 1836, Congress authorized the establishment of a "University of Florida," and the first constitution of Florida Territory in 1838 specifically guaranteed that seminaries of higher learning be created. It was not until the 1850s, however, that the Florida Legislature took steps towards implementing these plans.

In 1851, the legislature voted to allow the establishment of two seminaries on either side of the Suwannee River: West Florida Seminary and the East Florida Seminary. On January 6, 1853, Florida governor Thomas Brown signed the legislation that provided public support for the seminaries. Gilbert Kingsbury was the first person to seek state support under the legislation, and his East Florida Seminary in Ocala, Florida became Florida's first state-supported institution of higher learning when it opened in the fall of 1853. The West Florida Seminary opened in Tallahassee in 1857.

The East Florida Seminary closed in 1861 as Florida seceded from the US at the onset of the Civil War. Between a lack of students and funding, higher education in the state came to a virtual standstill during and immediately after the conflict.

=== Post-Civil War ===
==== East Florida Seminary ====
James Henry Roper, an educator from North Carolina and a Florida State Senator from Alachua County, established Gainesville Academy in 1858. It closed three years later. The academy's facilities were still vacant after the Civil War, so Roper offered the property to the state as a new home for the East Florida Seminary. The state accepted his offer, and the seminary was reestablished in Gainesville in 1866. Epworth Hall, the main building of seminary's Gainesville campus, still stands near downtown outside the modern university's campus.

==== Florida Agricultural College ====
In 1884, Jordan Probst established what became the other major predecessor to the University of Florida, Florida Agricultural College in Lake City. Florida Agricultural College became the first land-grant college in the state, and as its name implied, its curriculum focused on the scientific training of agricultural and mechanical specialists.

==== Universities of Florida ====
Florida's post-Civil War 1868 constitution required the establishment of a state-sponsored university. The state's first attempts to establish a multi-college university came in 1883 in Tallahassee, where the legislature merged the West Florida Seminary with the Tallahassee College of Medicine and Surgery to create the "Florida University." The old West Florida Seminary became the new university's Literary College and contained several "schools" or departments, though its "separate Charter and special organization" was maintained. The university charter also mentioned three more colleges that were to be established at a later time: a Law College, a Theological Institute, and a Polytechnic and Normal Institute.

In 1885, the Florida Legislature voted to rename the school in Tallahassee as the "University of Florida" but did not supply additional funding, and the institution struggled to finance its expanding academic programs. The school never actually adopted the name, and the medical college relocated to Jacksonville later in 1885. Florida Agricultural College in Lake City announced its desire to merge with Florida University for the 1887 school term, but the legislature did not act on the idea. The Tallahassee-based school adopted the name "Florida State University" from 1891 until 1901, when it became Florida State College.

In 1903, the Florida Legislature transferred the "University of Florida" designation to Florida Agricultural College in Lake City in recognition of the school's desire to expand its curriculum beyond its original focus on agriculture and engineering. It operated under that name for two school years before Florida's system of higher education was completely reconfigured and restructured by the Buckman Act and all state-sponsored schools were consolidated.

== 1905–1909: University of the State of Florida ==
=== The Buckman Act ===
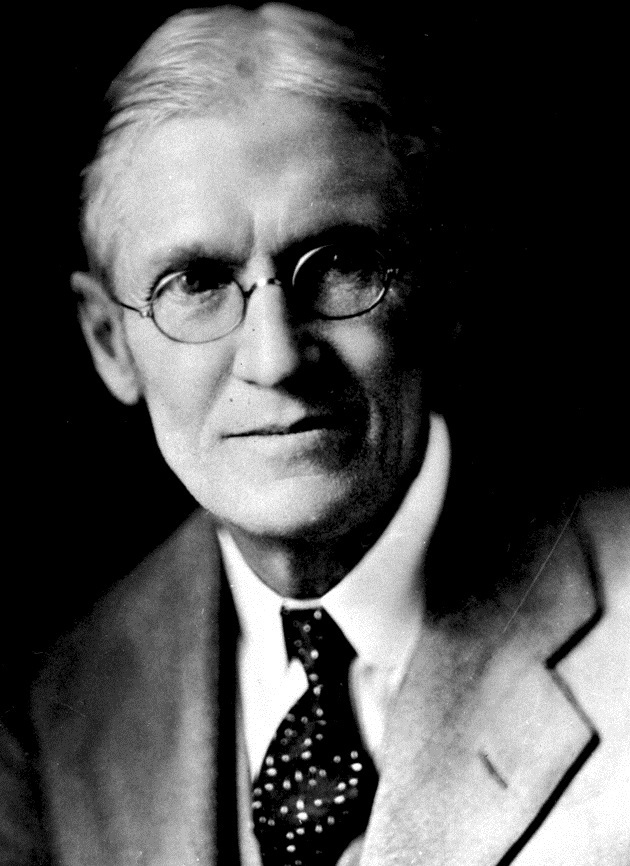
Andrew Sledd, the first president of the University of Florida (1905–1909). During his presidency, the university was officially known as the "University of the State of Florida"

In 1905 the state passed the Buckman Act, which reorganized the State University System of Florida and empowered the Florida Board of Control to govern the system. The act, named for legislator Henry Holland Buckman, mandated the consolidation of the state's six institutions into three: one for African Americans, one for white women, and one for white men. Four of the institutions – the University of Florida at Lake City (formerly Florida Agricultural College) in Lake City, the East Florida Seminary in Gainesville, the St. Petersburg Normal and Industrial School in St. Petersburg, and the South Florida Military College in Bartow – were merged into the new University of the State of Florida.

The University of the State of Florida served as the institution for white men; the State Normal School for Colored Students (the future Florida A&M University) served African Americans, and the Florida Female College (the future Florida State University) served white women. A fourth school provided specialized training and education for the deaf and blind (the Florida School for the Deaf and Blind).

Though several cities vied to be chosen as the site of the new university, Lake City and Gainesville quickly emerged as the two leading candidates. Newspapers and leading citizens of the nearby towns extolled the virtues of their community in the media, and in July 1905, both sent delegations to the meetings of the state Board of Control where the placement of the school would be decided. Lake City offered the use of the campus of Florida Agricultural College plus additional acres of adjacent land, while Gainesville's proposal included over 500 acres of land west of the town, the extension of Alachua Road (now West University Avenue) to the site, and water service to the university "without charge in perpetuity". On July 6, 1905, the Board of Control voted 6 to 4 to establish the new University of the State of Florida in Gainesville, much to the disappointment and anger of the citizens of Lake City.

=== Establishment in Gainesville ===
Since the facilities of the East Florida Seminary were not large enough to accommodate the new university while construction commenced on its new campus, the Board of Control decided to house the institution at the FAC campus at Lake City for the 1905–1906 academic year. Andrew Sledd, president of the University of Florida at Lake City, was chosen as the first president of the new university, and architect William A. Edwards was commissioned with designing the first permanent buildings for the new Gainesville campus in the Collegiate Gothic style.

The school's first year was a time of transition. Classes were held on the existing Lake City campus while supplies and personnel where gradually moved to Gainesville against the wishes of Lake City leaders, who filed a series of unsuccessful legal challenges attempting to halt the move. In the summer of 1906, the university attempted to procure the use of wagons to move the final shipment of supplies and equipment to the train station, but no Lake City livery stable would take the job, and wagon teams had to be brought from Gainesville. A crowd of angry Lake City residents watched as the last four wagons left the campus on July 23, the professor in the lead wagon holding a rifle across his knees to discourage interference.

President Andrew Sledd oversaw the designing of the new school's courses of study, the opening of its campus in Gainesville (Buckman Hall and Thomas Hall being the first buildings completed), and the establishment of its athletic program, and classes began in Gainesville on September 26, 1906, with 102 students enrolled. However, Sledd drew increasing criticism from members of the Florida legislature and Board of Education for setting high admissions standards which they felt limited the university's growth potential. On the other hand, members of the university's Board of Control defended Sledd and insisted that the new school should not compromise its academic standards to artificially raise enrollment. To end the controversy, Sledd resigned as the school's president near the end of the spring 1909 term.

== 1909–1945: Reorganization, reform, depression and war ==
=== Murphree era ===
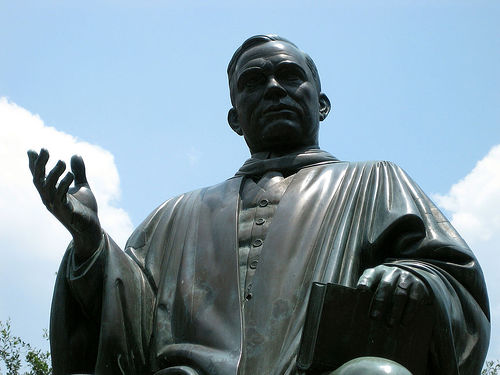
Campus statue of Albert A. Murphree, the second president of the University of Florida (1909–1927). Murphree organized many of the university's constituent colleges and schools.

The fledgling school's name was simplified to the University of Florida in 1909, the same year that Albert A. Murphree was appointed to be its second president. Murphree had previously served as the president of Florida State College and had led its transformation into the Florida State College for Women. During his 18 years as UF's president, Murphree oversaw the establishment of many of its constituent colleges and schools: the College of Arts and Sciences, the College of Law, the College of Agriculture, the College of Engineering, the College of Education, the School of Pharmacy, the School of Architecture, and the College of Commerce and Journalism along with the university's graduate program. Student enrollment increased from just under 200 when Murphree arrived in 1909 to over 2,000 when he unexpectedly died in 1927.

Another important event that occurred during Murphree's tenure was the naming of the Florida Gators. The university had established an athletic program immediately upon opening in Gainesville in 1906, but its teams did not initially have a mascot. This changed in 1911, when a local vendor designed and sold school pennants and other regalia featuring an alligator. The school colors of orange and blue, also chosen about the same time, are believed to be a combination of the blue and white school colors of the University of Florida at Lake City and the orange and black school colors of the East Florida Seminary in Gainesville, the university's two primary predecessors.

In 1924, the Florida Legislature permitted women of a "mature age" (at least 21 years old) who had completed sixty semester hours from a "reputable educational institution" would be allowed to enroll during regular semesters at the university in programs that were unavailable at Florida State College for Women. Before this, only the summer semester was coeducational, to accommodate teachers. Lassie Goodbread-Black from Lake City became the first woman to enroll at the University of Florida, at the College of Agriculture in 1925. However, the percentage of women students in Gainesville remained quite low until after World War II.

=== Tigert era ===
John J. Tigert became the university's third president in 1928. Before arriving in Gainesville, Tigert had been the president of Kentucky Wesleyan College; a philosophy professor, athletic director, basketball coach and football coach at the University of Kentucky; and the U.S. Commissioner of Education for seven years. Tigert brought many new ideas for reforming academics, athletics and administration to the university. Disgusted by the under-the-table payments being made by universities to athletes in this era, Tigert advocated the grant-in-aid athletic scholarship program in the early 1930s, which was the genesis of the modern athletic scholarship plan currently used by the NCAA. Under Tigert's administration, UF founded the University Athletic Association (UAA) to raise funds and administer the university's sports programs. UAA's first project was the construction of a new football stadium, Florida Field, and two years later, Florida became a charter member of the new Southeastern Conference. On the academic side, the school awarded its first doctoral degrees, was granted a chapter of Phi Beta Kappa, established the new University College, and placed new emphasis on liberal arts general education requirements during Tigert's presidency.

When the United States entered World War II following the Japanese attack on Pearl Harbor on December 7, 1941, most students withdrew to enlist in the U.S. military. Having survived the financial stresses and strains of the Great Depression, the university could have failed financially when most of its student body departed. To survive the financial stresses of the war years, the university offered its campus, classrooms and dormitories to the U.S. Government for the training of aircrews for the U.S. Army Air Force.

== 1946–1984: GI Bill and post-World War II era ==
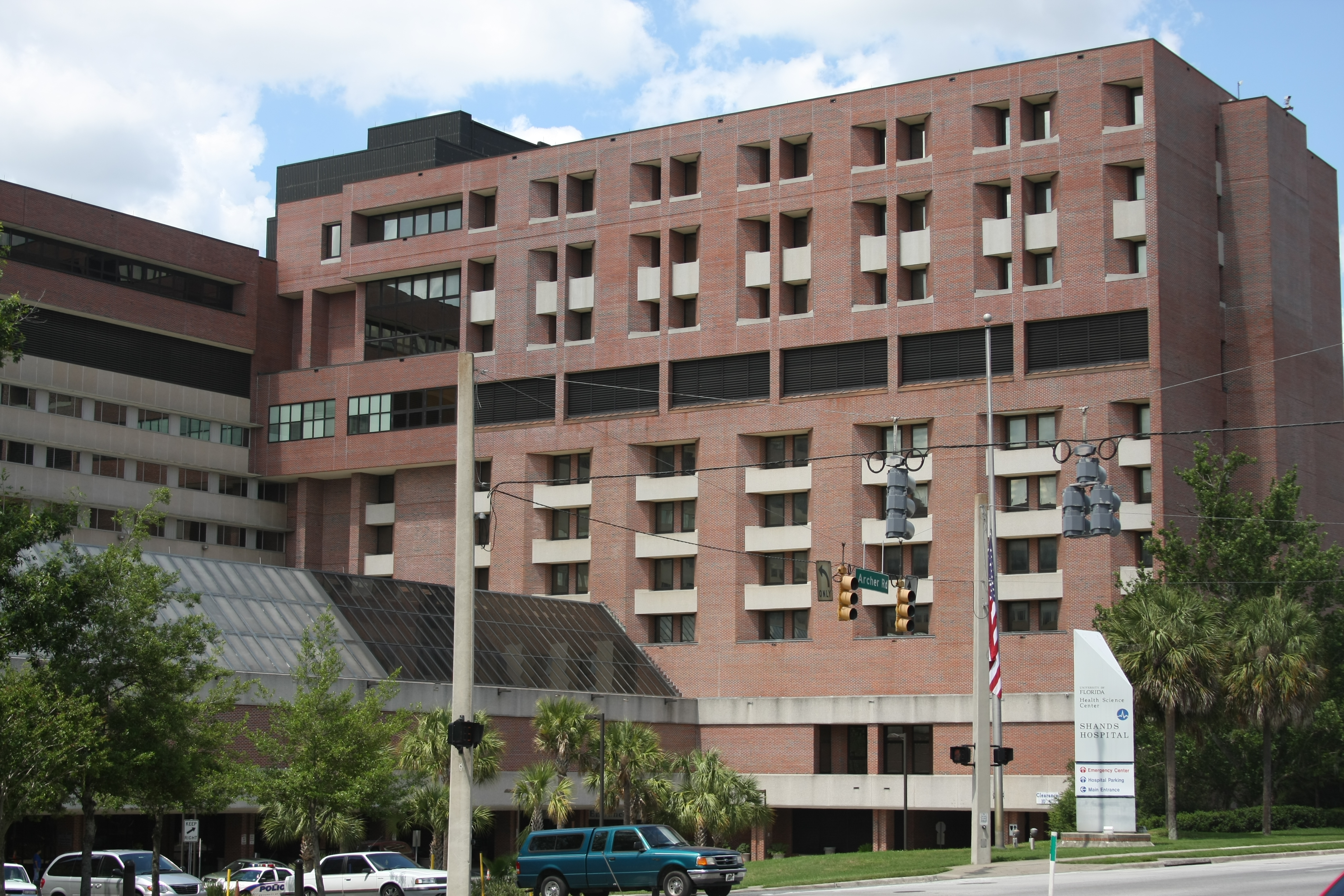
UF Health Shands Hospital

When World War II ended and veteran students began to return to Gainesville in 1946, the university was overwhelmed with both returning and new students buoyed by their GI Bill of Rights (Servicemen's Readjustment Act) educational benefits. By 1947, over 7,500 students were enrolled, more than three times the number of students in 1928.

Unable to accommodate the immediate increased demand for college education in Florida, the Florida Board of Control opened the Tallahassee Branch of the University of Florida on the campus of Florida State College for Women in Tallahassee. By the end of the 1946–1947 school year, 954 men were enrolled at the Tallahassee Branch. The following semester, the Florida Legislature returned the Florida State College for Women to coeducational status and renamed it Florida State University, and the University of Florida began open enrollment of female students. Thereafter, all of the university's various colleges and schools were open to female students. The J. Hillis Miller Health Science Center was founded in 1956 and Shands at the University of Florida was founded two years later, at the same time as the College of Medicine was established under the direction of dean George Harrell. Rapid expansion of the university's campus structures and student population began in the 1950s under presidents J. Hillis Miller, Sr. and J. Wayne Reitz. Under Reitz, the university peacefully integrated and African-American students were allowed to enroll in the university in 1968.

== 1985–present: National and international prominence ==
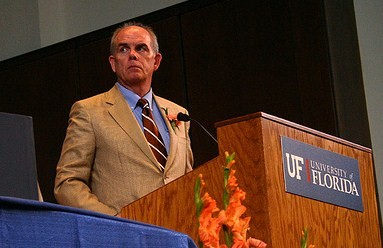
Former President Dr. James Bernard Machen

In 1985, Florida became a member of the Association of American Universities (AAU), a higher-education organization presently composed of sixty-two public and private United States and Canadian research universities. Florida is one of thirty-four public universities that belong to the AAU. In 2009, President Bernie Machen and the University of Florida Board of Trustees announced the future reduction of the number of undergraduates, and an increase of resources for graduate education and research.

The University of Florida has continued to rise in the U.S. News & World Report college and university rankings. In 2001, Florida was labeled a Public Ivy, and, in 2010, was ranked second in Kiplinger's "Best Buys of Education," behind the University of North Carolina). U.S. News & World Report currently ranks the University of Florida twenty-eighth among national universities, public and private, and fifth among all public national universities.

In 2013, Florida Governor Rick Scott publicly announced his support for the University of Florida to ascend into the top ten among public universities, as measured by U.S. News & World Report. In 2017, the University of Florida became the first university in the state of Florida to crack the top ten best public universities according to U.S. News. The University of Florida was awarded $837.6 million in annual research expenditures in sponsored research for the 2018 fiscal year. In 2017, university President Kent Fuchs announced a plan to hire 500 new faculty in order to break into the top five best public universities; the majority of new faculty members will be hired in STEM fields. 230 faculty have been hired with the remaining 270 faculty to be hired by fall of 2019.

== Controversies ==
After a several months long legal dispute, the University of Florida allowed neo-Nazi and white supremacist Richard Spencer to rent the Curtis M. Phillips Center for the Performing Arts as part of Spencer's nationwide propaganda program targeting university campuses. Months earlier, the white supremacist Unite the Right rally in Charlottesville, Virginia resulted in the death of counter-protester Heather Heyer. In response to the threat of violence from alt-right agitators, Governor Rick Scott declared a state of emergency in Alachua County. The university would foot the majority of the bill for enhanced security leading up to the October 19 speaking event, including dispatch of over 500 policemen across campus.

Gainesville residents and University of Florida students alike organized protests against Spencer's visit to campus under the banner of the "No Nazis At UF" collective. Both the faculty union and graduate student union at the university urged administration and then President Kent Fuchs to cancel Spencer's scheduled event, citing concerns for personal safety of faculty, staff, and students. Spencer's speaking event was met by approximately 2,500 peaceful protestors outside and inside the venue, outnumbering Spencer's supporters. Protestors inside the performance venue successfully drowned out Spencer's speech, forcing him to end his appearance 25 minutes earlier than scheduled.

In the immediate aftermath of Spencer's appearance, three of his sympathizers were arrested on felony charges after opening gun fire on protestors as they were leaving the event. All three white supremacists had traveled from Texas to attend Spencer's UF rally. Within a year, one of the arrested men would be indicted in Texas on domestic violence charges.

== Historic sites ==
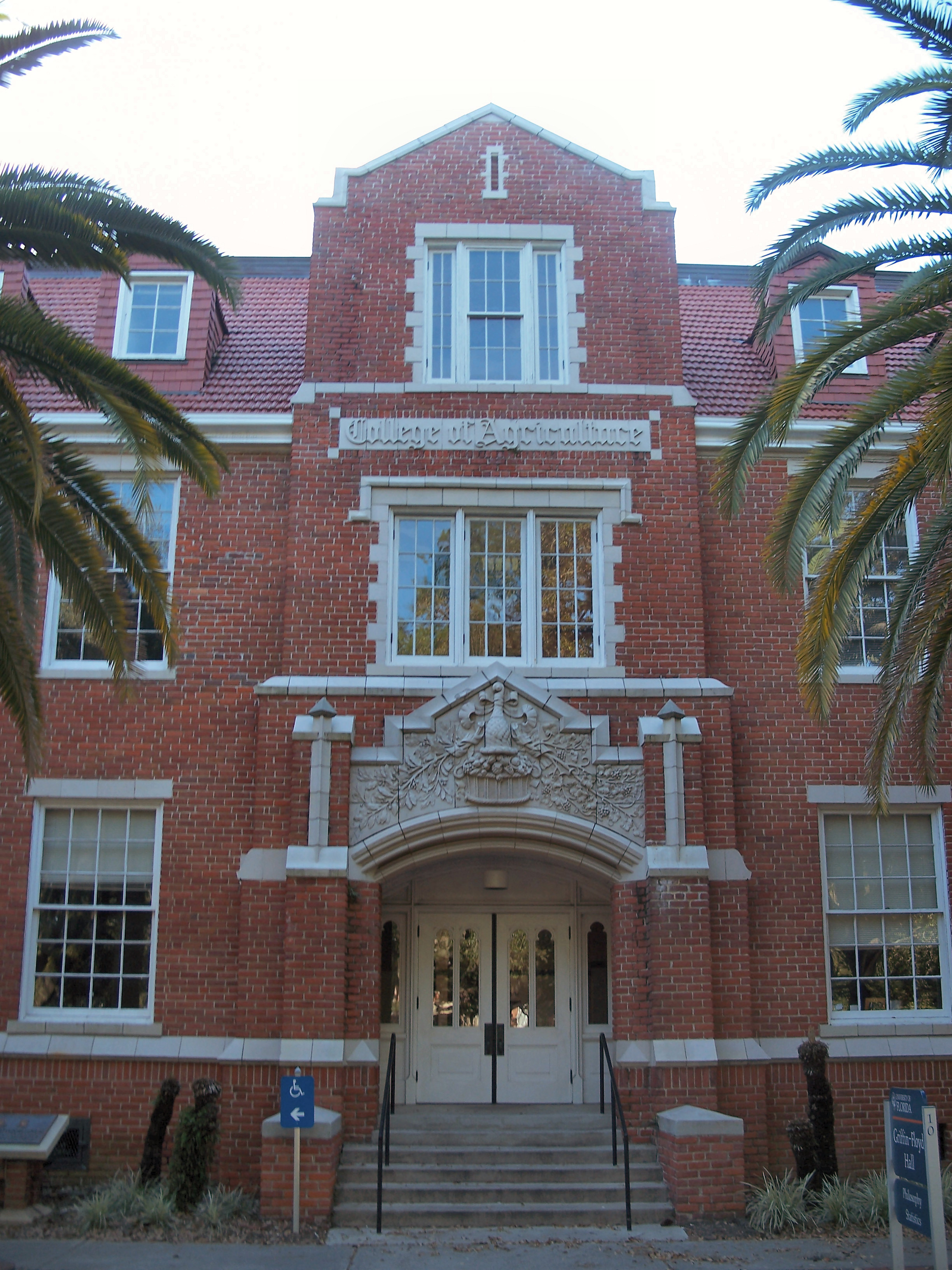
Griffin-Floyd Hall

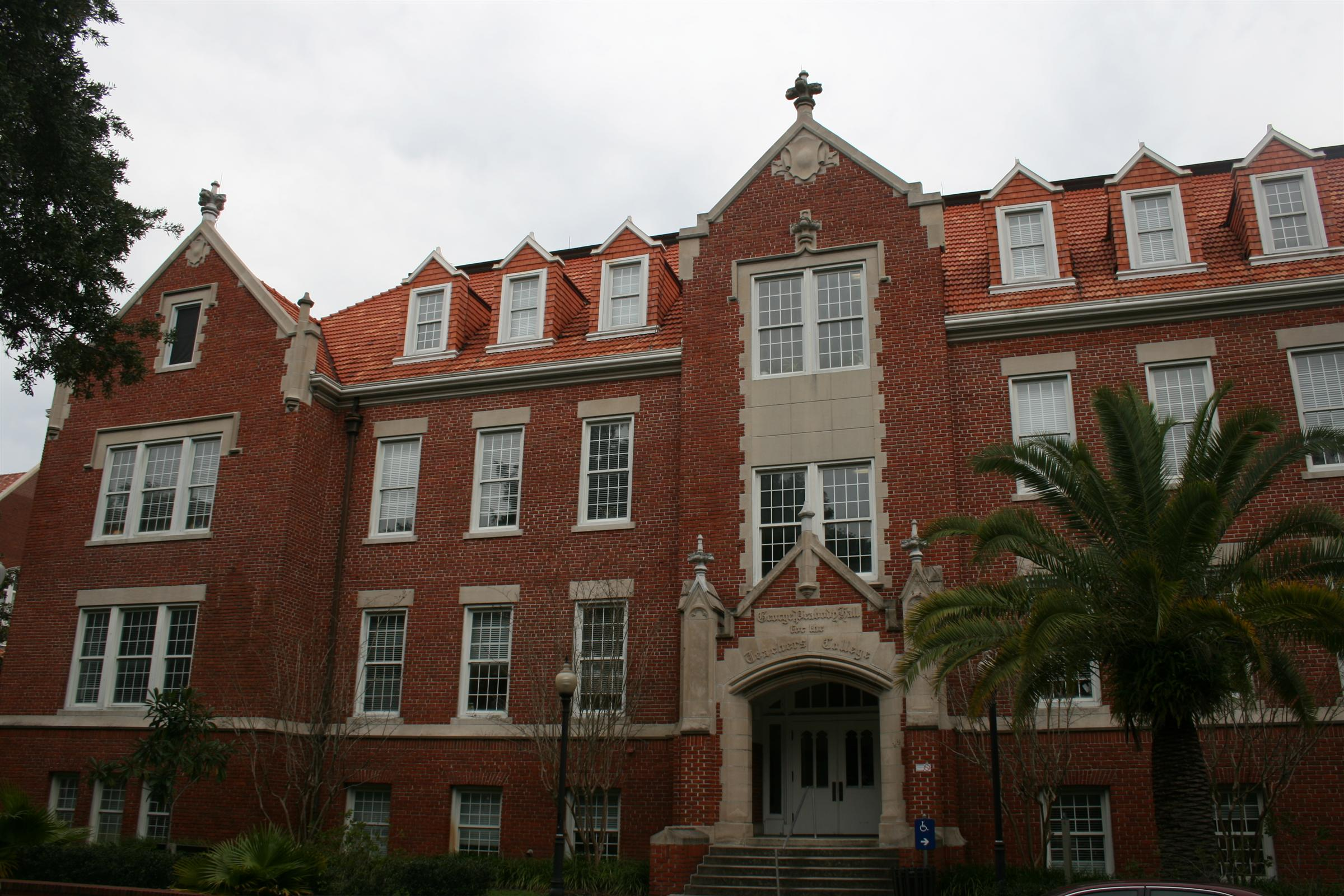
Peabody Hall

A number of the University of Florida's buildings are historically significant. The Campus Historic District comprises numerous buildings and encompasses approximately 650 acres (2.6 km^{2}). Two buildings outside the historic district, the old WRUF radio station (now the university police station) and Norman Hall, are also listed on the historic register. The buildings listed on the U.S. National Register of Historic Places for their architectural or historic significance are:

- Anderson Hall
- Bryan Hall
- Buckman Hall
- Carlton Auditorium
- Dauer Hall
- Century Tower
- Epworth Hall
- Fletcher Hall
- Flint Hall
- Florida Gymnasium
- Griffin-Floyd Hall

- Infirmary
- Leigh Hall
- Library East
- Mallory Hall
- Matherly Hall
- Murphree Hall
- Newell Hall
- Norman Hall
- Old WRUF Radio Station
- Peabody Hall
- Plaza of the Americas

- Reid Hall
- Rolfs Hall
- Sledd Hall
- The Hub
- Thomas Hall
- Tigert Hall
- University Auditorium
- Walker Hall
- Weil Hall
- Women's Gymnasium
- Yulee Hall

== Timeline of colleges ==
University presidents
President	Years
Andrew Sledd	1905 – 1909
Albert A. Murphree	1909 – 1927
* James M. Farr	1927 – 1928
John J. Tigert	1928 – 1947
* Harold Hume	1947 – 1948
J. Hillis Miller, Sr.	1948 – 1953
* John S. Allen	1953 – 1955
J. Wayne Reitz	1955 – 1967
Stephen C. O'Connell	1967 – 1973
* E. T. York	1973 – 1974
Robert Q. Marston	1974 – 1984
Marshall Criser	1984 – 1989
* Robert A. Bryan	1989 – 1990
John V. Lombardi	1990 – 1999
Charles E. Young	1999 – 2003
J. Bernard Machen	2003 – 2014
W. Kent Fuchs	2015 – 2023, *2024–Present
Ben Sasse	2023 – 2024
*Denotes acting/interim president See also List of University of Florida presidents

College/school founding
College/school	Year founded
College of Agricultural and Life Sciences	1906
Rinker School of Building Construction	1906
College of Education	1906
College of Law	1909
College of Engineering	1910
College of Liberal Arts and Sciences	1910
College of Journalism and Communications	1916
College of Pharmacy	1923
College of Design Construction and Planning	1925
Warrington College of Business	1926
P.K. Yonge Research School	1934
College of Health and Human Performance	1946
J. Hillis Miller Health Science Center	1956
College of Medicine	1956
College of Nursing	1956
College of Public Health and Health Professions	1958
Institute of Food and Agricultural Sciences	1964
College of Dentistry	1972
College of Fine Arts	1975
College of Veterinary Medicine	1976
Division of Continuing Education	1976
Fisher School of Accounting	1977
International Center	1991
Graham Center for Public Service	2006

== Historical photos ==
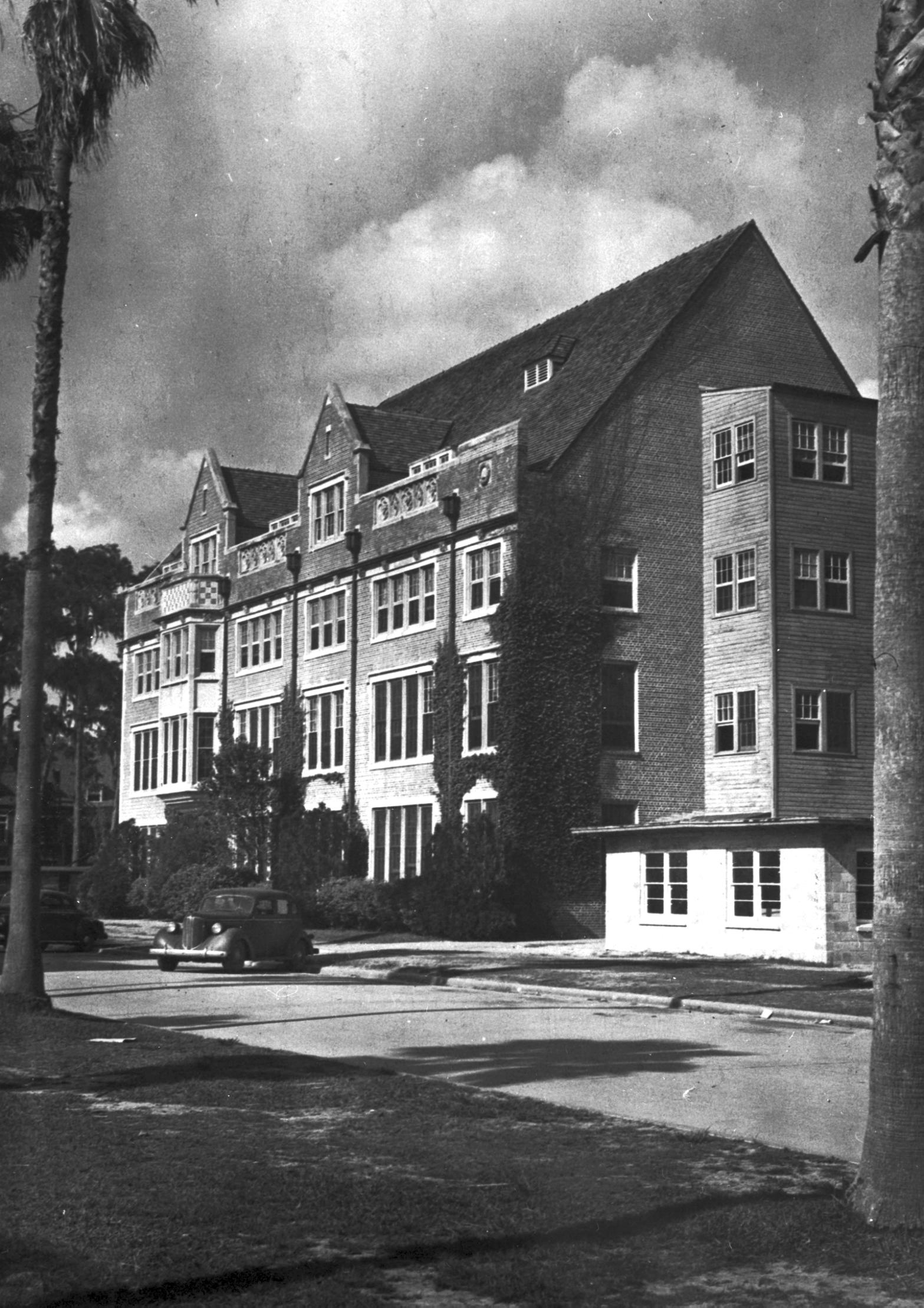
Rolfs Hall

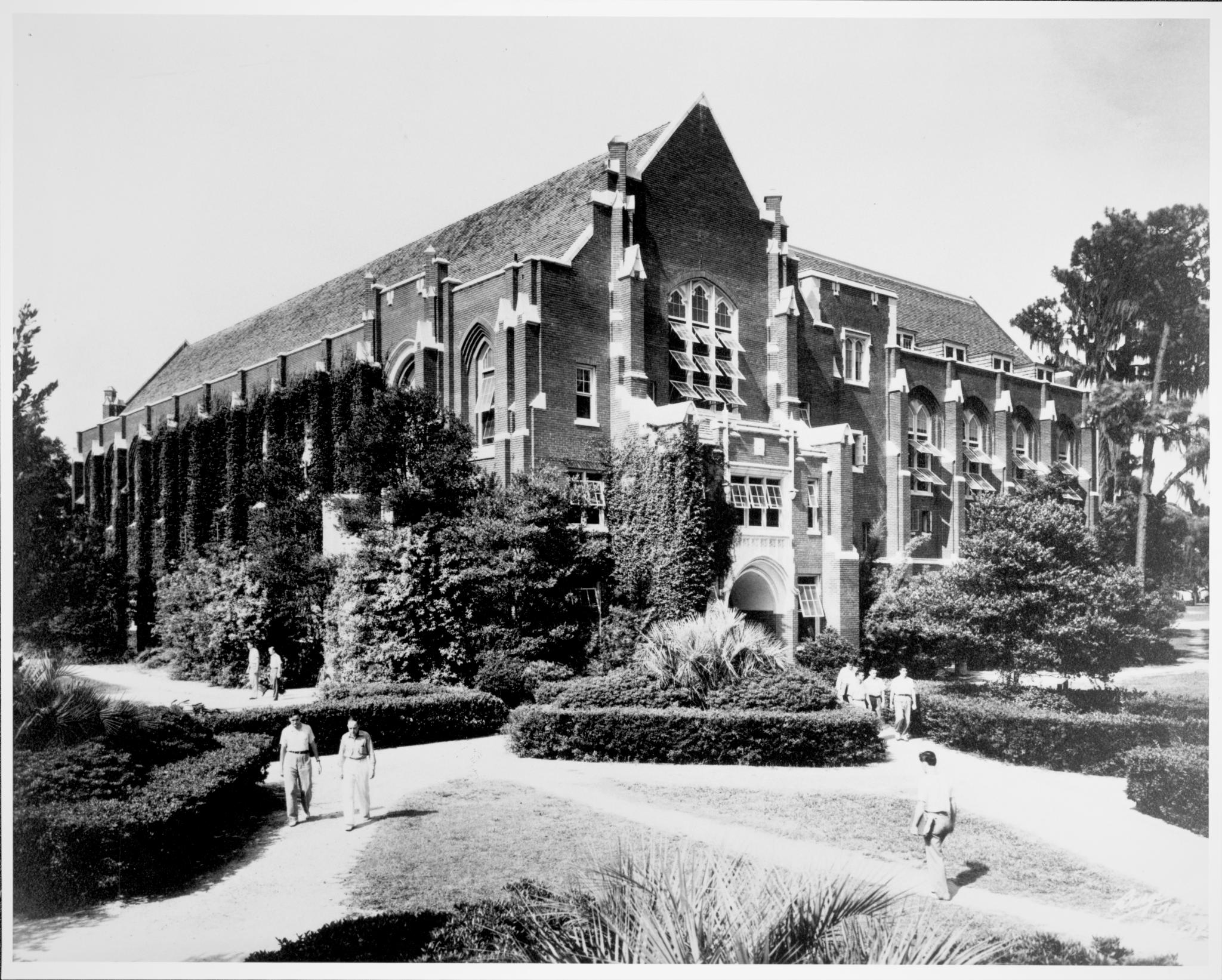
Smathers Library

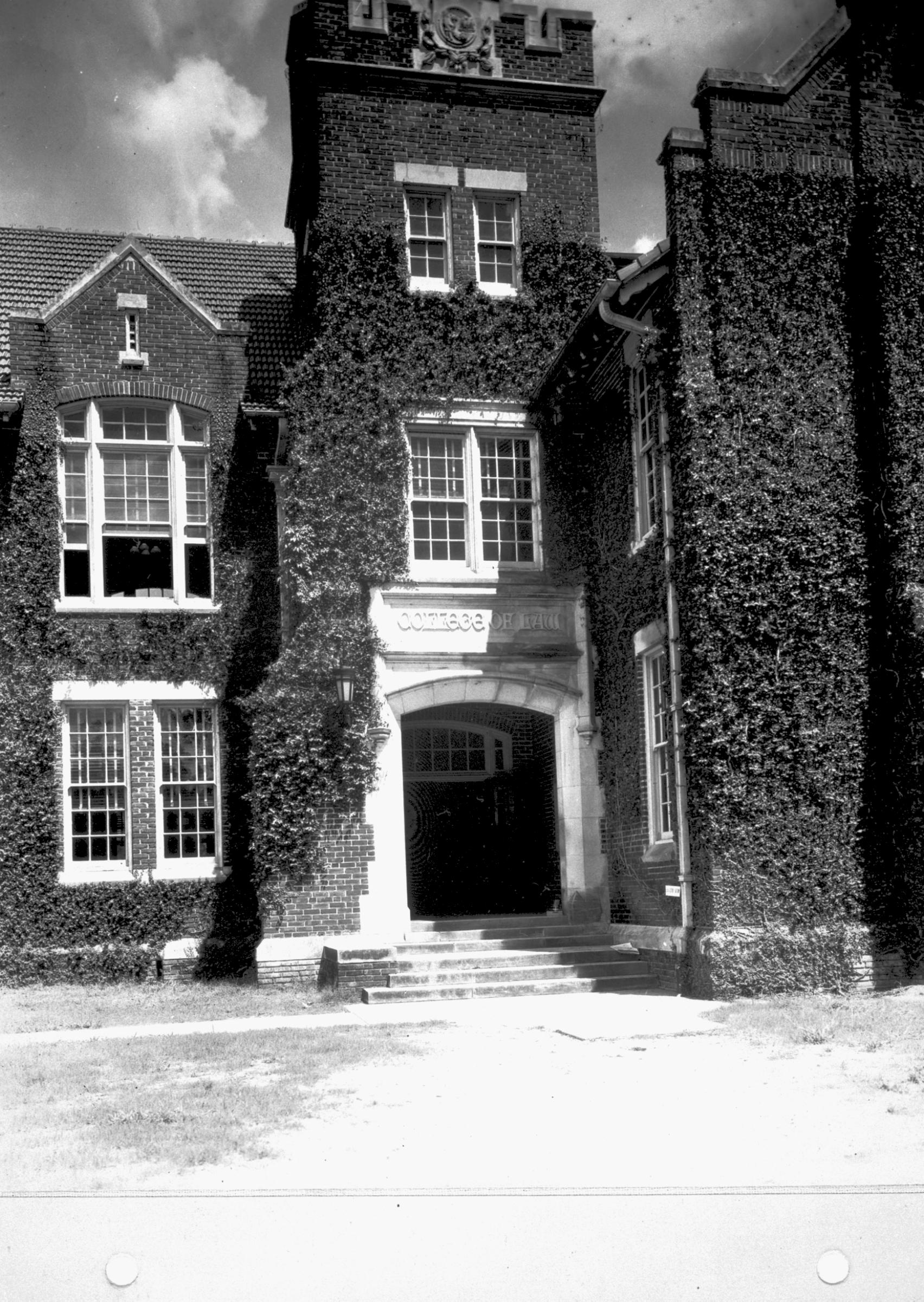
Bryan Hall

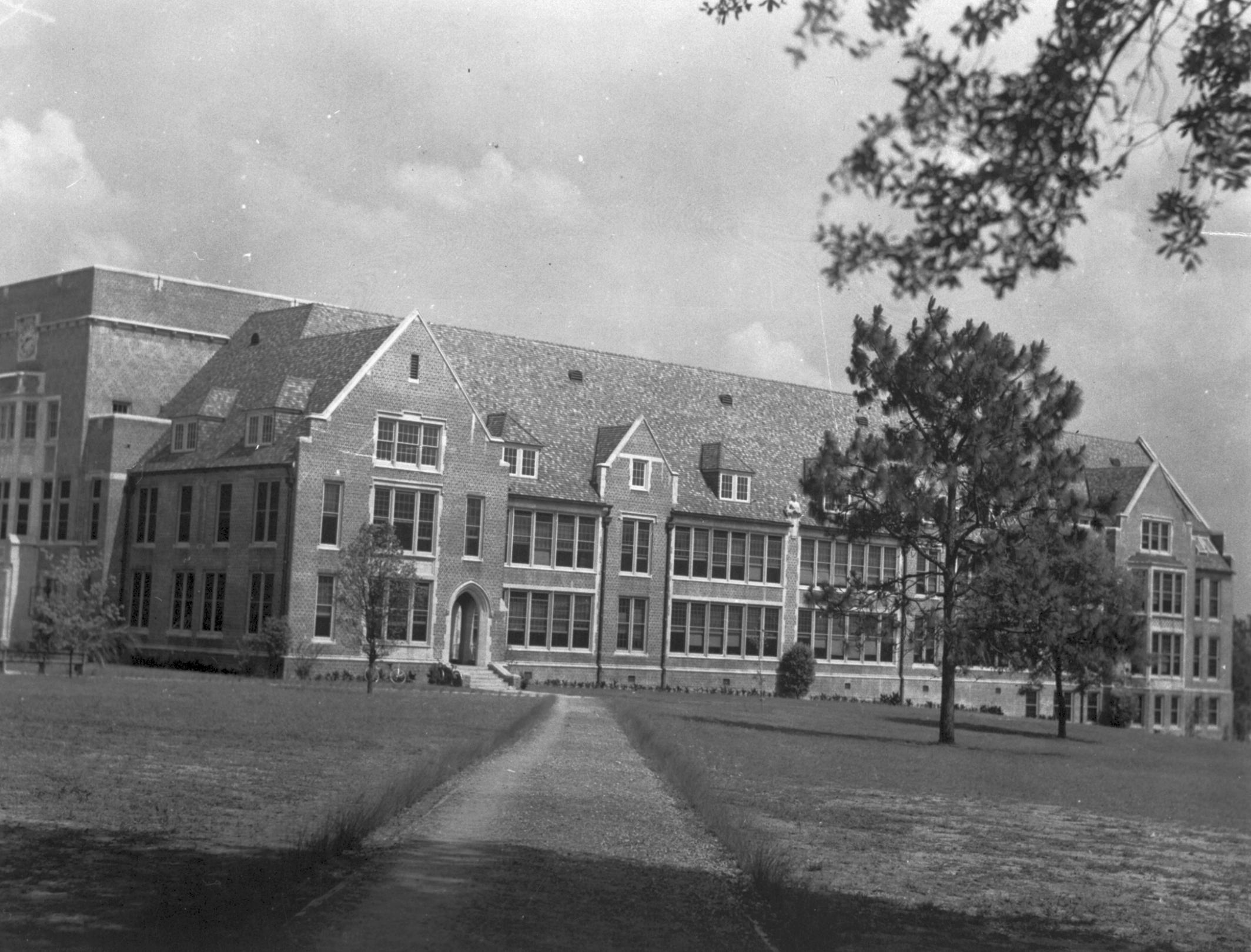
Norman Hall

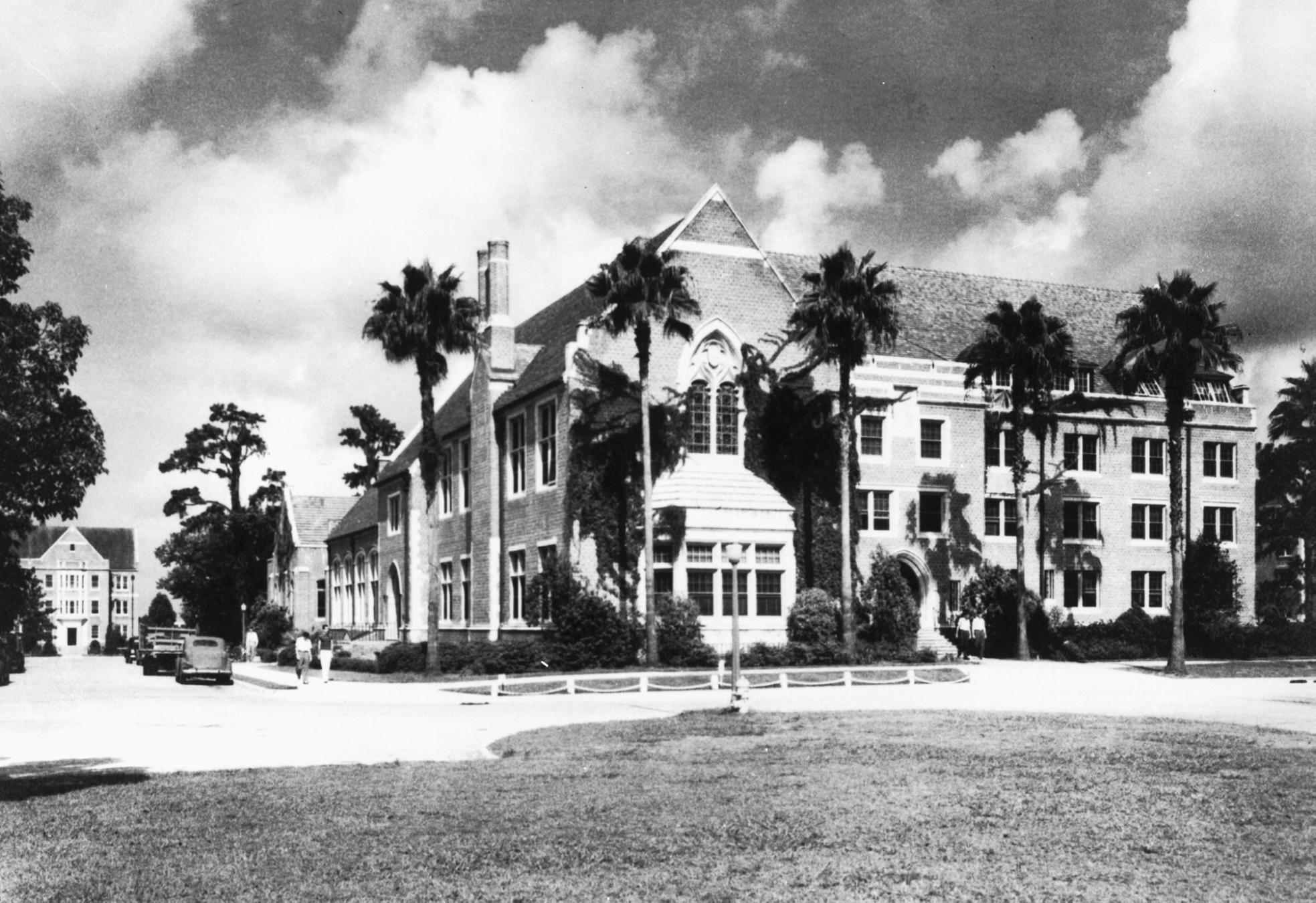
Dauer Hall

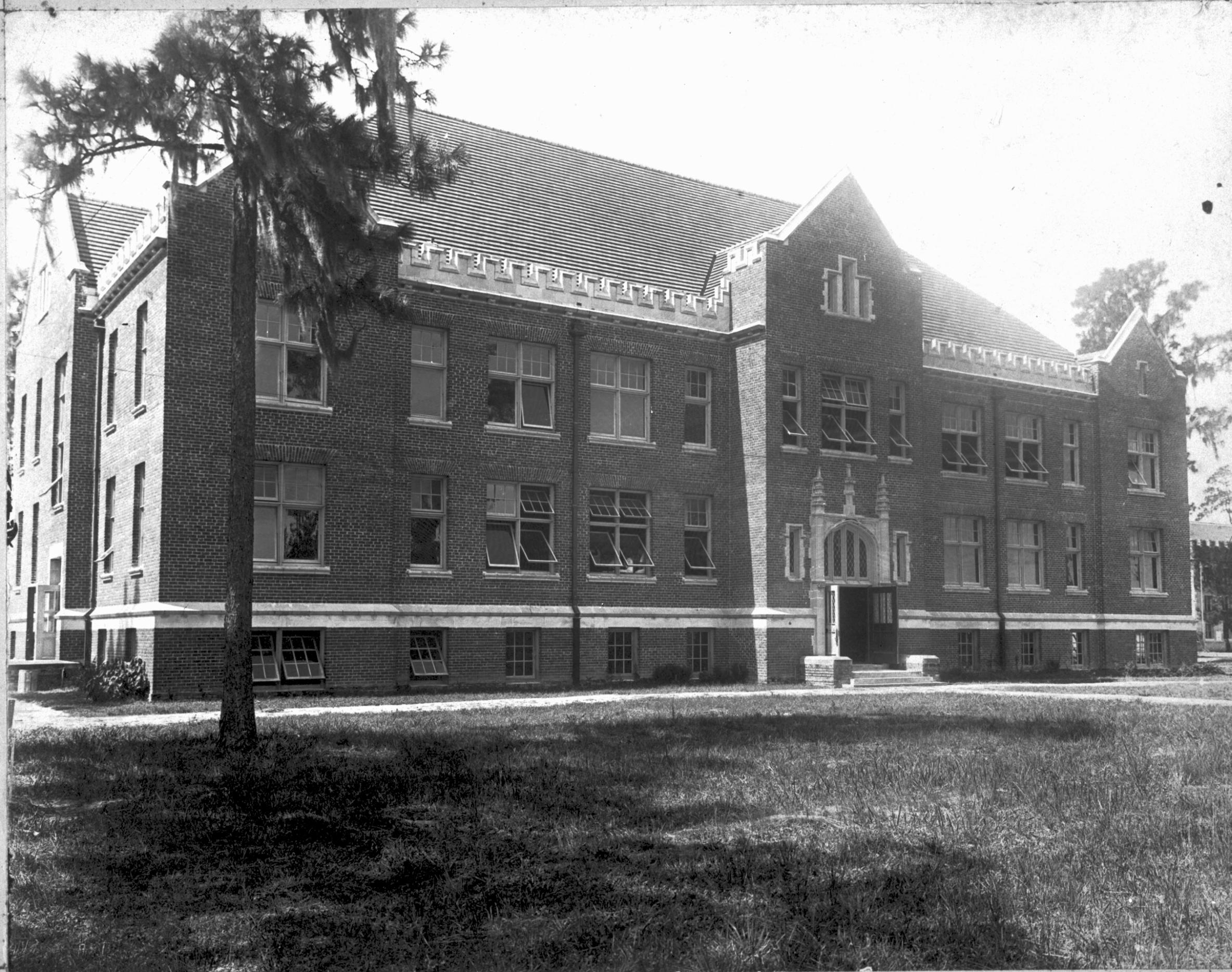
Flint Hall

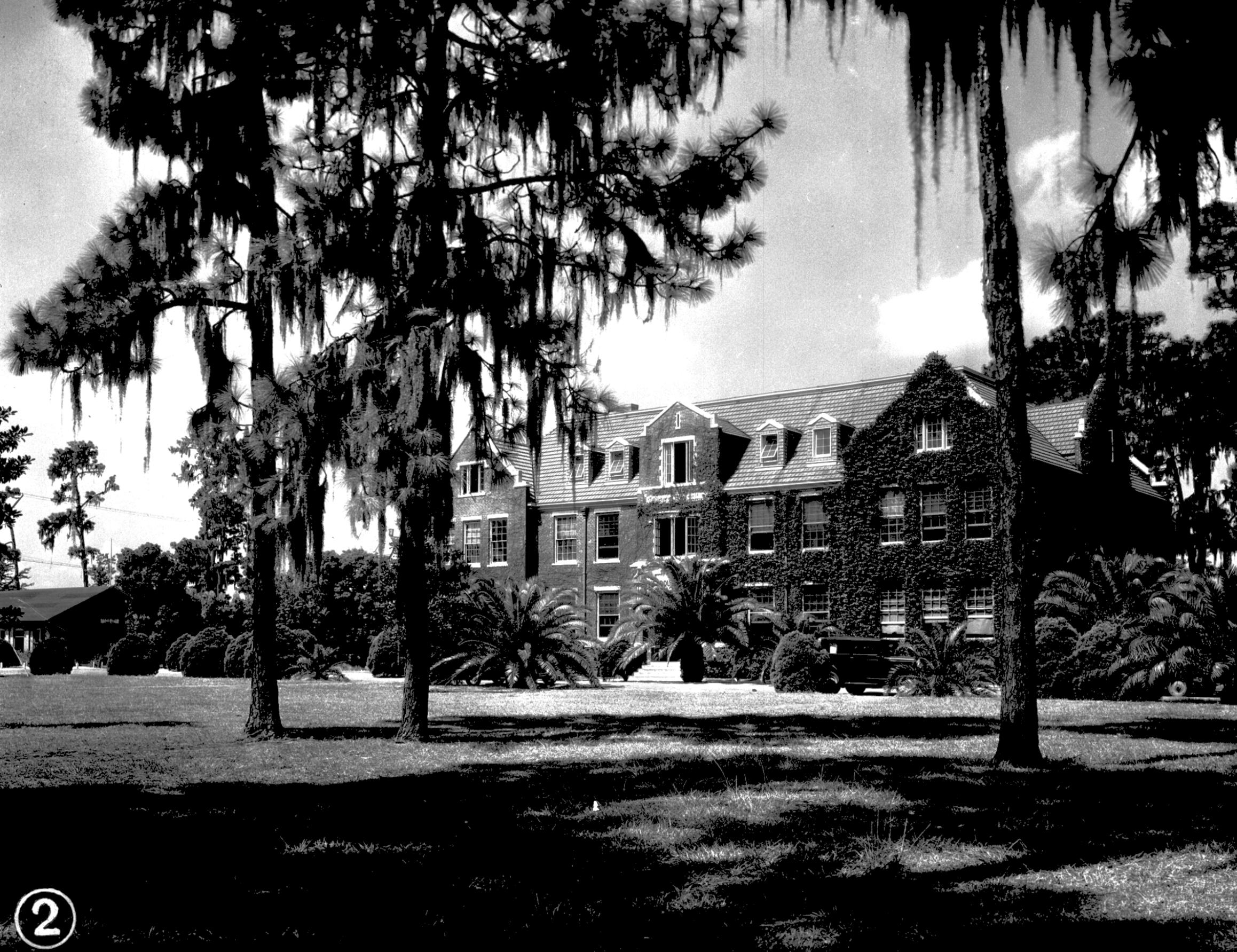
Griffin-Floyd Hall

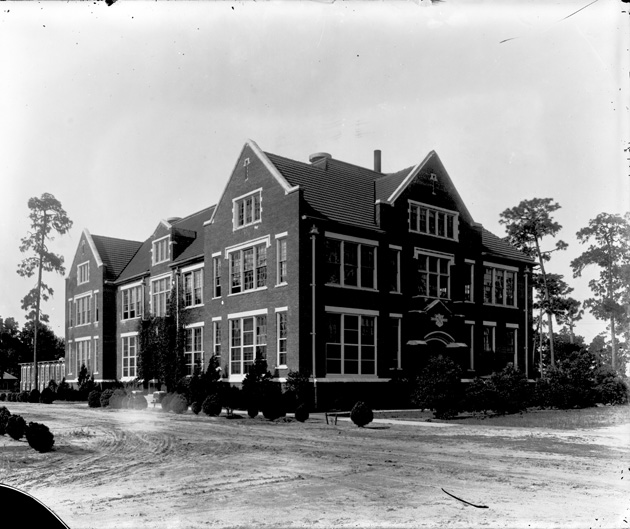
Benton Hall

== See also ==
- History of Florida
- History of Florida State University
- List of University of Florida alumni
- List of University of Florida buildings
- List of University of Florida faculty and administrators
- List of University of Florida presidents
- University of Florida Alumni Association
- University of Florida Athletic Association
- University of Florida Campus Historic District
