= James Roper =

James Roper may refer to:

- James Henry Roper (c. 1835–1883), American politician from Florida
- C. James Roper (1905–1983), American physician and politician from Georgia

== See also ==
- Jim Roper (1916–2000), NASCAR driver
