= Tallahassee Female Academy =

Coordinates: 30.4418°N 84.2837°W

The Tallahassee Female Academy (also known as the Leon Female Academy) was established in 1843 as the Misses Bates School. At the time there were no public high schools in Florida. Male and female students studied separately.

A group of Tallahassee citizens organized as a board of trustees for the academy conducted operations until the school was absorbed by the West Florida Seminary for Boys in 1858 and admitted girls. The school offered an unusually complete education for the time.

In 1871, the Leon County Board of Public Instruction opened a new Leon Academy for white students. Leon Academy served students from elementary through their first two years of high school. Students normally completed their final two years at the West Florida Seminary. Leon High School was not fully integrated until 1963.
