= University of Florida College of Agricultural and Life Sciences =

School at the University of Florida

College of Agricultural and Life Sciences
- Type: Public
- Established: 1964
- Parent institution: University of Florida
- Dean: Dr. Elaine Turner
- Students: 6,334
- Location: Gainesville, Florida, United States
- Website: cals.ufl.edu

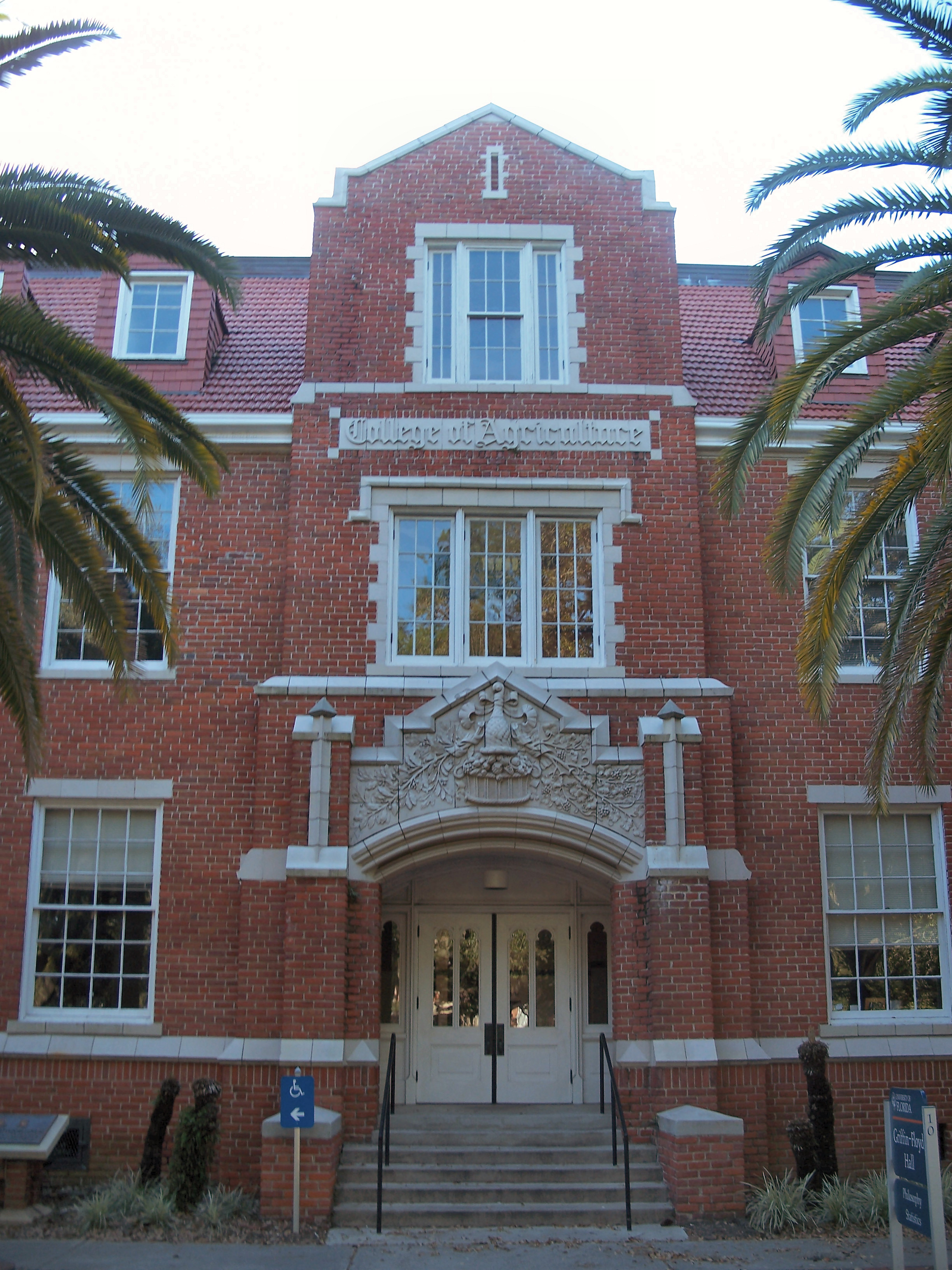
Griffin-Floyd Hall Home of CALS

The College of Agricultural and Life Sciences (CALS) is a college of the University of Florida. The college was founded in 1964.

== Overview ==
The programs offered specialize in agriculture, natural resources, and life sciences. CALS has two schools with it:

The School of Forest Resources and Conservation (forestry and conservation) and the School of Natural Resources and Environment (natural resources and environmental science).

CALS has 24 undergraduate majors, more than 50 areas of specialization and 20 graduate programs, CALS is an educational leader in the areas of food, agriculture, natural resources and life sciences.

== Institute of Food and Agricultural Sciences ==
CALS administers the degree programs of the University of Florida's Institute of Food and Agricultural Sciences (IFAS). IFAS is a federal, state, and local government partnership dedicated to develop knowledge in agriculture, human and natural resources, and the life sciences and to make that knowledge accessible to sustain and enhance the quality of human life. IFAS was awarded $181.7 million in annual research expenditures in sponsored research for 2024.

== Florida Department of Citrus ==
The Florida Department of Citrus has its department of economic research at 2125 McCarty Hall.

== Departments & Schools ==
- Agricultural and Biological Engineering
- Agricultural Education and Communication
- Agronomy
- Animal Sciences
- Entomology and Nematology
- Environmental Horticulture
- Family, Youth and Community Sciences
- Food and Resource Economics
- Food Science and Human Nutrition
- Horticultural Sciences
- Microbiology and Cell Science
- Plant Pathology
- School of Forest Resources and Conservation
- School of Natural Resources and Environment
- Soil and Water Science
- Wildlife Ecology and Conservation
