= Griffin–Floyd Hall =

- Floyd Hall
- U.S. National Register of Historic Places
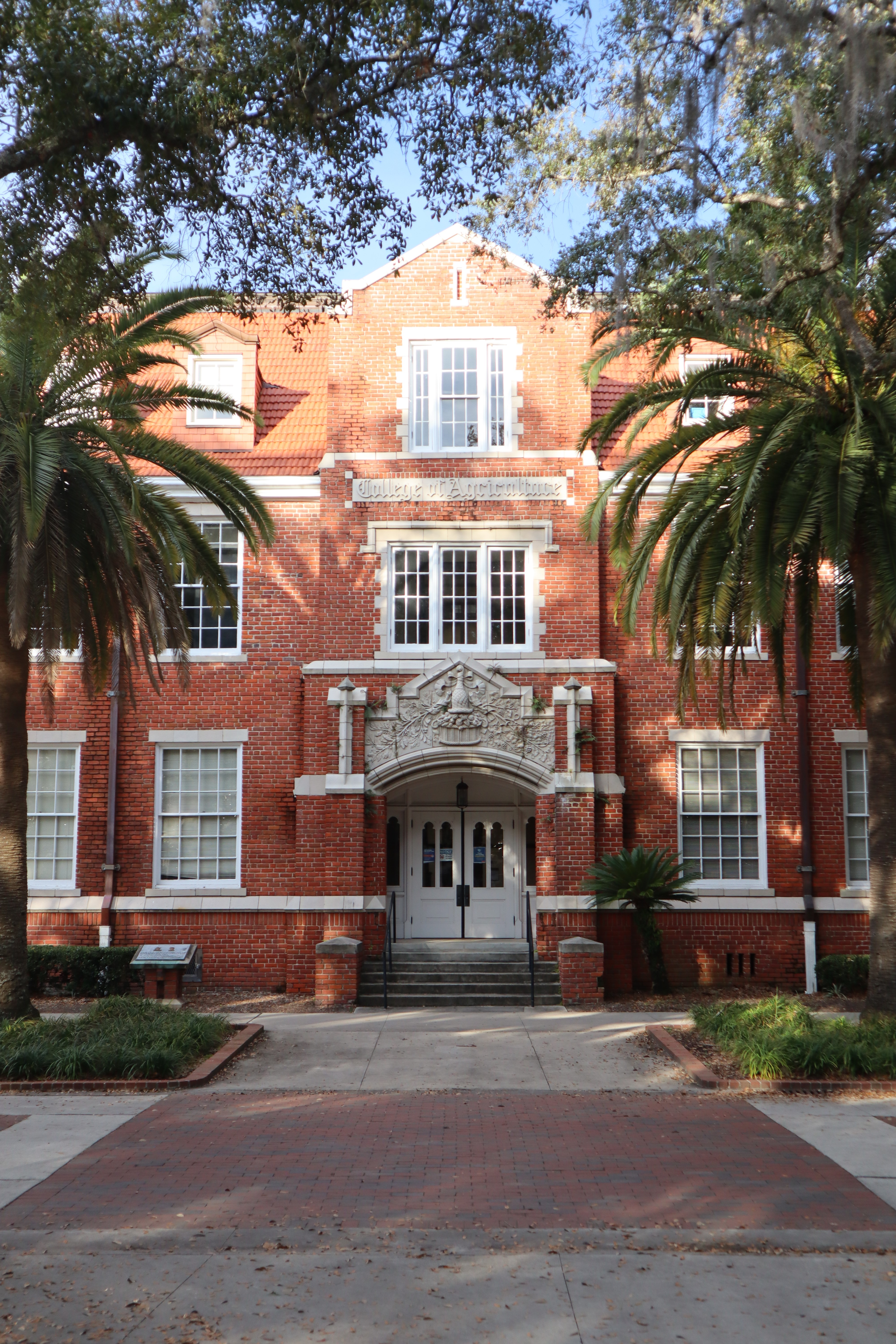

- Location within Florida
- Location: Gainesville, Florida
- Coordinates: 29°38′59″N 82°20′38″W
- Architect: William A. Edwards
- NRHP reference No.: 79000655
- Added to NRHP: June 27, 1979

Griffin–Floyd Hall (originally known as Floyd Hall) is a historic academic building located on the northeastern portion of the University of Florida campus in Gainesville, Florida. On June 27, 1979, it was added to the U.S. National Register of Historic Places. It currently houses the Department of Philosophy and Department of Statistics.

== Namesake ==
Griffin–Floyd Hall is named for Major Wilbur Leonidas Floyd, one of three graduate students to receive the first master's degrees ever awarded by the University of Florida, and assistant dean of the College of Agriculture from 1915 to 1938, and for Ben Hill Griffin, Jr., an alumnus of the college and a successful agricultural businessman.

== Early use ==
Built in 1912, the building was originally used in part to house animal husbandry faculty. Located near the university's dairy, the first floor once held a cattle judging arena. The second floor housed a chapel for daily religious exercise.

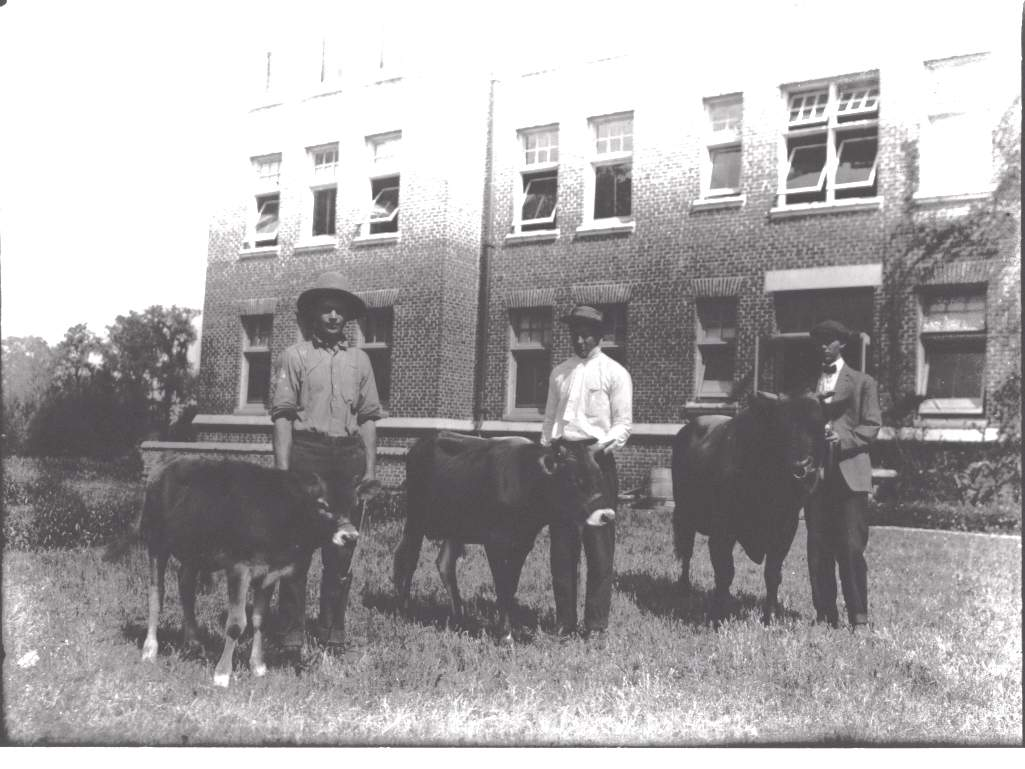
Floyd Hall in 1915

== See also ==
- History of the University of Florida
- List of University of Florida buildings
- University of Florida Campus Historic District
