= Institute of Food and Agricultural Sciences =

Florida University-linked organization

IFAS
- Type: Federal-state-county partnership
- Established: 1964
- Endowment: ▲$2.379 billion (2021) (university-wide)
- Vice-president: Dr. J. Scott Angle
- Faculty: 572 (state), 293 (county)
- Administrative staff: 1,102
- Students: 5,100
- Postgraduates: 1,200
- Location: Gainesville, Florida, US
- Website: www.ifas.ufl.edu
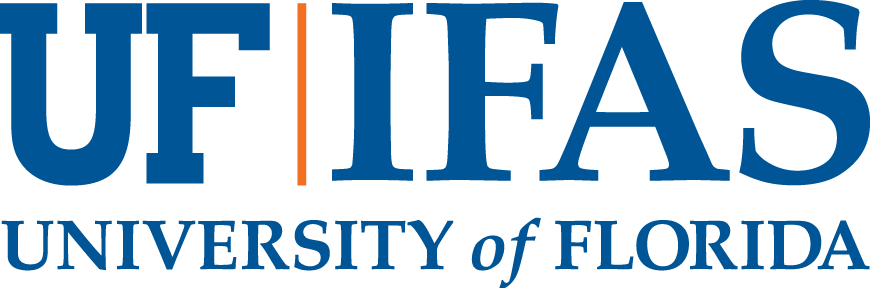

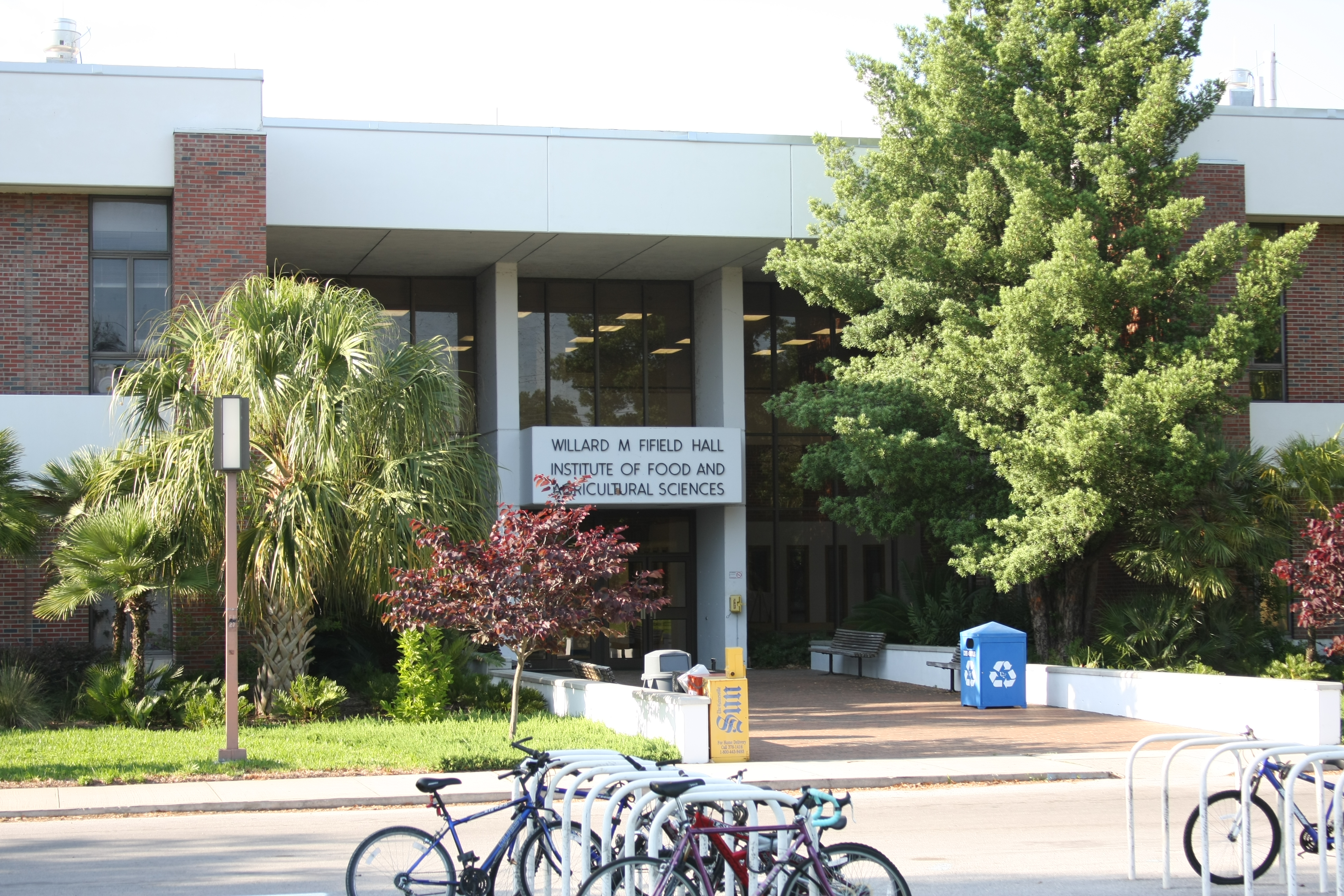
Fifield Hall

The University of Florida Institute of Food and Agricultural Sciences (UF/IFAS) is a teaching, research and Extension scientific organization focused on agriculture and natural resources. It is a partnership of federal, state, and county governments that includes an Extension office in each of Florida's 67 counties, 12 off-campus research and education centers, five demonstration units, the University of Florida College of Agricultural and Life Sciences (including the School of Forest, Fisheries and Geomatics Sciences and the School of Natural Resources and Environment), three 4-H camps, portions of the UF College of Veterinary Medicine, the Florida Sea Grant program, the Emerging Pathogens Institute, the UF Water Institute and the UF Genetics Institute.

UF/IFAS research and development covers natural resource industries that have a $101 billion annual impact. The program is ranked #1 in the nation in federally financed higher education R&D expenditures in agricultural sciences and natural resources conservation by the National Science Foundation for FY 2019. Because of this mission and the diversity of Florida's climate and agricultural commodities, IFAS has facilities located throughout Florida. On July 13, 2020, Dr. J. Scott Angle became leader of UF/IFAS and UF's vice president for agriculture and natural resources.

== Research ==
The mission of UF/IFAS is to develop knowledge in agricultural, human, and natural resources, and to make that knowledge accessible to sustain and enhance the quality of human life. Faculty members pursue fundamental and applied research that furthers understanding of natural and human systems. Research is supported by state and federally appropriated funds and supplemented by grants and contracts. UF/IFAS received $155.6 million in annual research expenditures in sponsored research for FY 2021.

The Florida Agricultural Experiment Station administers and supports research programs in UF/IFAS. The research program was created in 1887 by federal legislation known as the Hatch Act, a follow-up to the 1862 Morrill Act that established U.S. land-grant universities. The research programs support approximately 350 full-time equivalent faculty members in 16 academic departments on UF's Gainesville campus and at 13 research and education centers around the state.

Most UF/IFAS research can be easily accessed via the searchable UF/IFAS Electronic Data Information Source (EDIS).

=== Food safety ===
UF/IFAS supports one of the nation's largest collections of food safety facilities and faculty in the country, and is integral in maintaining the National Food Safety Database.

Along with researchers specializing in controlling spread of pathogens such as E. coli and Salmonella, UF/IFAS also has uniquely specialized research programs dedicated to the science of food packaging and a Center for Food Distribution and Retailing.

=== Invasive species ===
Florida is the state most inundated with invasive plant and animal species. Nearly 85 percent of new plants entering the country travel through Miami. As such, much of the UF Department of Entomology and Nematology as well as a Center for Aquatic and Invasive Plants have been dedicated to fighting this problem.

=== Emerging pathogens ===
IFAS is part of the University of Florida's Emerging Pathogens Institute. UF/IFAS has been heavily involved in dealing with emerging food safety issues such the recent surge of E. coli and Salmonella infections due to bacteria on fresh produce served at restaurants and grocery stores.

=== Citrus research ===
Established in 1917, the UF/IFAS Citrus Research and Education Center is the largest citrus research institution in existence with more than 40 laboratories, 250 employees, and more than 600 acres of groves and greenhouses.

=== Avian flu ===
Dr. Gary Butcher is widely recognized as one of the foremost experts on poultry pathogens in the United States.

== Extension ==
Florida oranges

The 1914 Smith-Lever Act provided federal support for land-grant institutions to offer educational programs to enhance the application of useful and practical information beyond their campuses through cooperative extension efforts with states and local communities.

UF/IFAS Extension provides Floridians with lifelong learning programs in cooperation with county governments, the United States Department of Agriculture, and Florida A&M. The wide breadth of educational programming offered in each county responds to the local needs of residents, schools, regulatory agencies, community organizations, and industry.

== Facilities ==
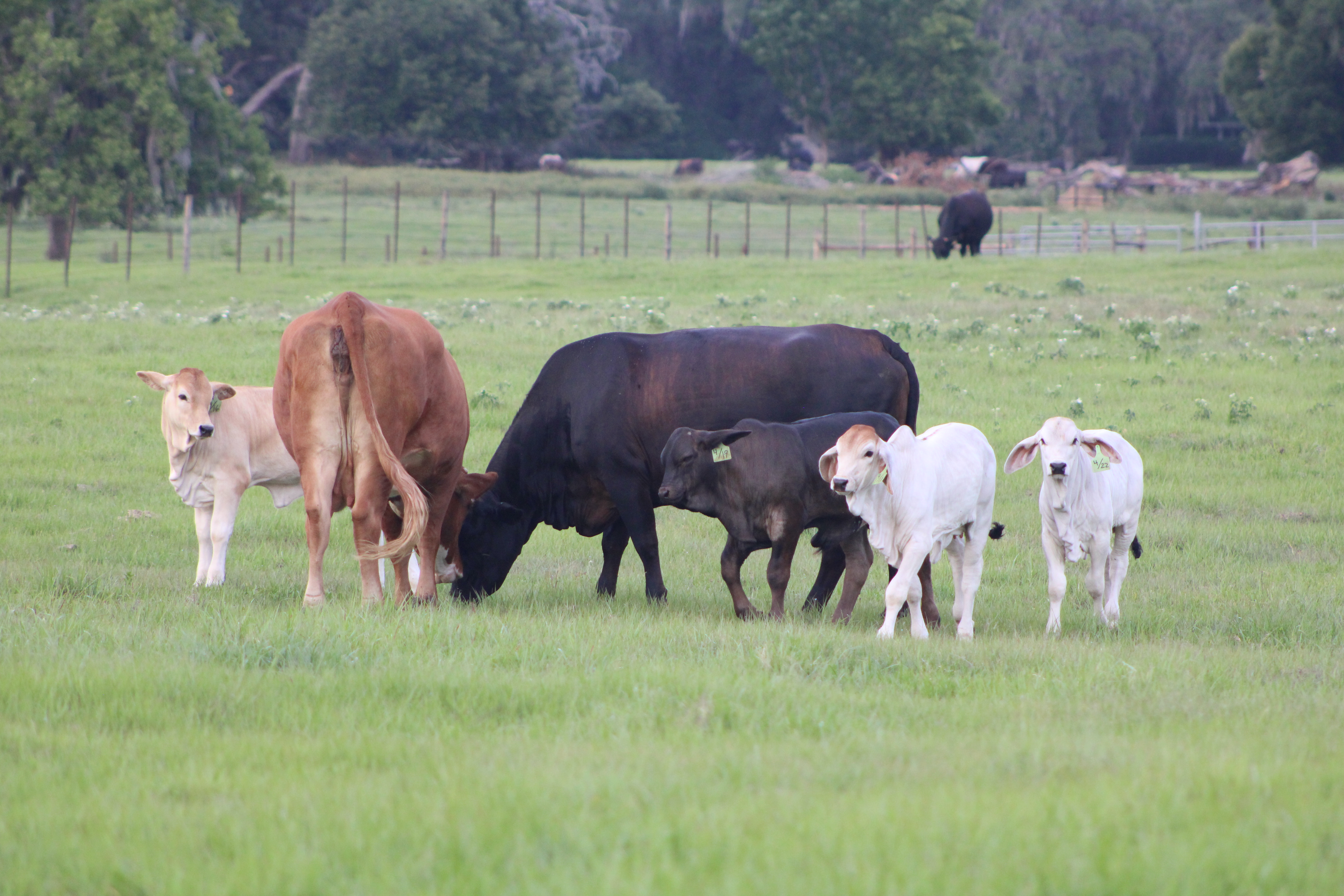
Some cows in the UF/IFAS Beef Teaching Unit

UF/IFAS owns 1,299 buildings and has employees in 1,397 buildings. It has 4,055,402 sq ft (376,759.2 m^{2}) gross, and 54,038 acres (21,868 ha) throughout the state. These facilities are used for teaching, research and demonstration:

- 16 on-campus academic departments and schools
- 12 off-campus Research & Education Centers (REC) located throughout the state
- A 27,000-acre preserve for teaching, research and Extension
- Florida Cooperative Extension Service offices in all 67 counties (counties operate and maintain)
- 5 research sites and demonstration sites, including two biological stations, a research forest, and an 850-acre dairy farm
- 4 locations with statewide undergraduate degree programs

The Meat Processing Center is also located within the UF/IFAS Department of Animal Sciences. Inside the center is the UF Meat Retail Store, a meat market selling locally raised meat products. UF/IFAS also operates the Beef Teaching Unit.

The Gulf Coast Research and Education Center was established in 1925. Its purpose is to develop and disseminate new technology and scientific knowledge that will assist Florida's producers to be competitive, both nationally and in the world economy.

== Teaching ==
=== College of Agricultural and Life Sciences ===
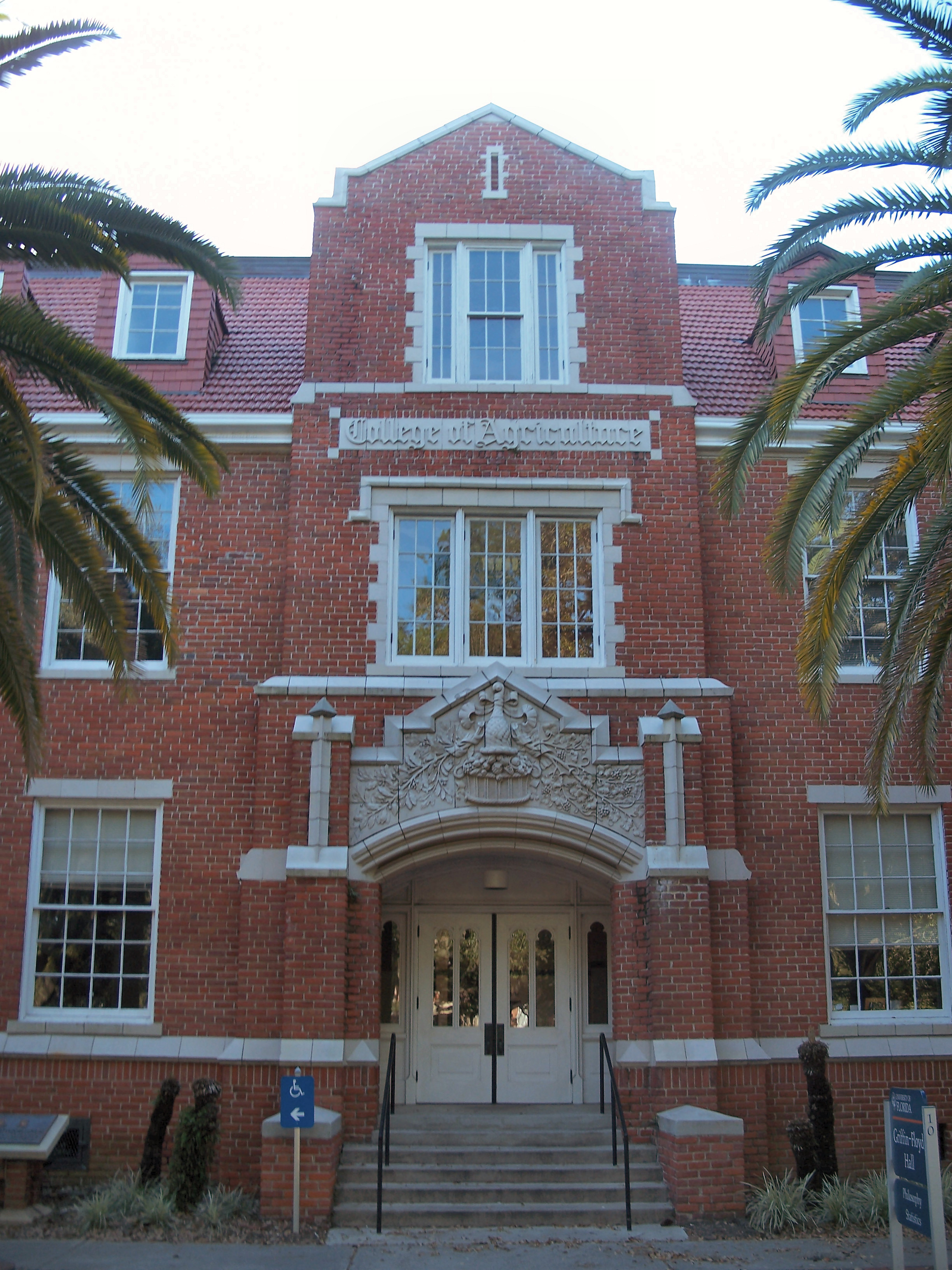
College of Agricultural and Life Sciences

The College of Agricultural and Life Sciences (CALS) offers 23 undergraduate majors and more than 50 areas of specialization to address the world's critical challenges related to agriculture, food systems, human wellbeing, natural resources and sustainable communities. Master's and doctoral degrees are offered by every department and school.

The college has more than 6,900 students (Fall 2021), including more than 2,400 graduate students. A majority are women, 26% are underrepresented minorities and 8% are international students. In addition to the Gainesville campus programs, the college offers baccalaureate degrees online and at four UF/IFAS research and education centers. Graduate degrees and undergraduate and graduate certificates are also available online.

=== Statewide programs ===
Recognizing the specialized needs of nontraditional students, CALS offers Bachelor of Science degree programs at Fort Lauderdale, Milton, Ft. Pierce, Apopka, and Plant City. Degree programs include agricultural education and communication, geomatics, natural resource conservation, and agribusiness management. Students must have an associate of arts degree to enter these statewide programs. These programs are in partnership with local/state/community colleges.

=== Online programs ===
CALS offers three Bachelor of Science degree programs in UF Online: entomology & nematology, environmental management in agriculture and natural resources, and microbiology and cell science. The college also has eight online master's degree programs, seven online undergraduate certificates and more than 20 online graduate certificates.

=== Organic agriculture ===
The 2006 fall academic semester marked the official launch of a science-based organic agriculture undergraduate degree program at UF, making it one of the first three U.S. institutions to offer this major. Colorado State University and Washington State University began similar programs simultaneously.

=== College of Veterinary Medicine ===
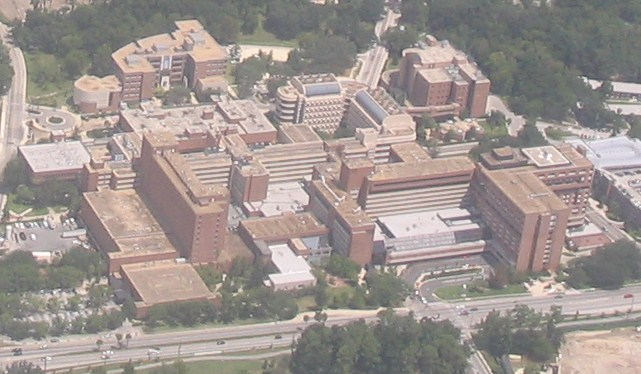
The Health Science Center

The College of Veterinary Medicine is jointly administered through the university's Health Science Center and IFAS. Support from UF/IFAS includes resources for large animal disease research, undergraduate instruction and veterinary extension.

=== Total alumni ===
40,685 living alumni as of August 2021, including 1,219 overseas.

== See also ==
- Agriculture
- Agricultural science
- Genomics of domestication
