= Epworth Hall (Gainesville, Florida) =

- U.S. National Register of Historic Places
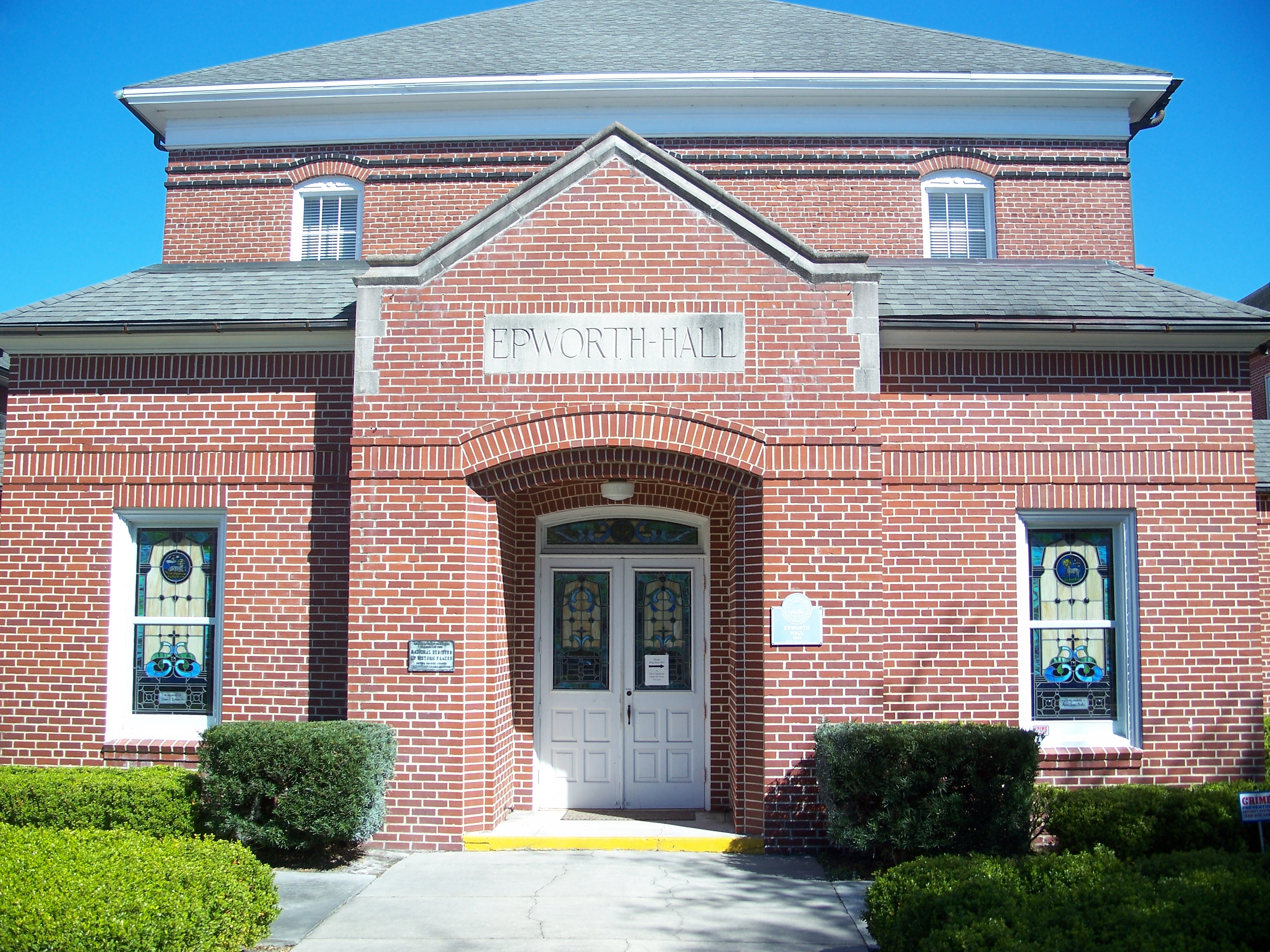

- Location within Florida Location within the United States
- Location: Gainesville, Alachua County, Florida
- Coordinates: 29°39′19.7″N 82°19′24.8″W
- Built: 1884
- Architect: J. O. Goodale
- NRHP reference No.: 73000562
- Added to NRHP: July 25, 1973

Epworth Hall is a historic building in Gainesville, Florida, United States. It is notable as one of the oldest surviving buildings associated with the University of Florida, though it is no longer part of the university's campus. It was erected in 1884 and is located at 419 Northeast 1st Street in downtown Gainesville. Now part of the First United Methodist Church, it was added to the U.S. National Register of Historic Places on July 25, 1973.

== History ==
The present building was erected in 1884, and replaced an earlier building destroyed by fire the previous year. It was built to serve as the Academic Building of the East Florida Seminary, one of the predecessor institutions of the University of Florida. Originally opened in 1853, the seminary relocated to Gainesville in 1866.

Epworth Hall had its four classrooms on the first floor, and offices, a library, and a study hall on the second floor. It served the East Florida Seminary for the remainder of the 19th century. In 1905 the Florida Legislature merged the seminary and three other institutions into the modern University of Florida, with Gainesville chosen as the location for the new institution. Beginning in the 1906 academic year the university's classes were held at Epworth Hall, while the buildings were being constructed on the new campus away from downtown. In 1911 the University of Florida completed its transition to the new campus, and deeded Epworth Hall to the First United Methodist Church, which still owns the property. It was added to the National Register of Historic Places in 1972, and renovated by the church the following year.
