= First Presbyterian Church (Tallahassee, Florida) =

Historic church in Florida, United States

- U.S. National Register of Historic Places
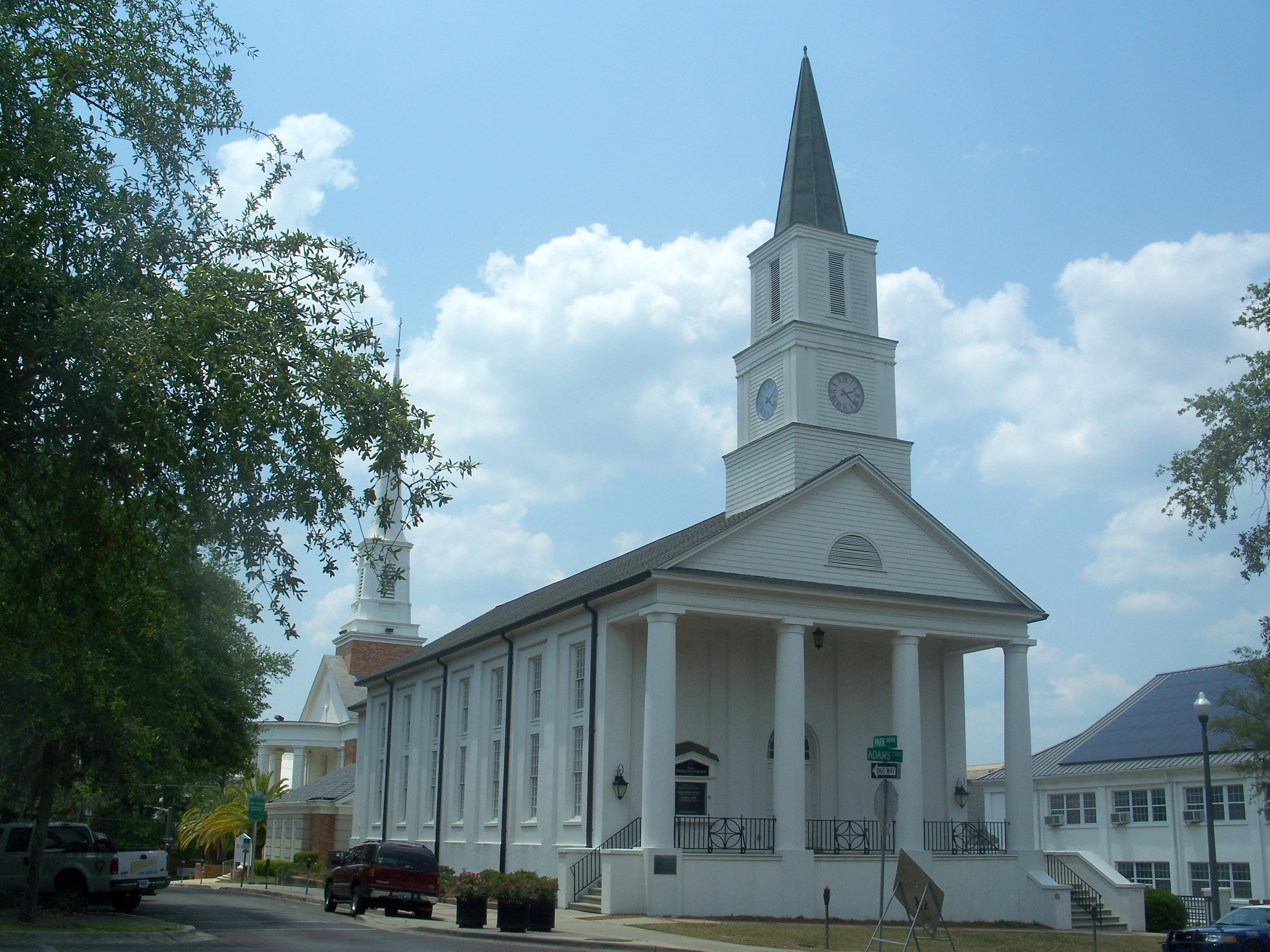

- Location within Florida Location within the United States
- Location: 102 N. Adams St., Tallahassee, Florida
- Coordinates: 30°26′32″N 84°16′57″W
- Built: 1835–38
- Architectural style: Greek Revival with Gothic Revival elements
- NRHP reference No.: 74000649
- Added to NRHP: September 9, 1974

First Presbyterian Church is an historic church in Tallahassee, Florida. It is located at 102 North Adams Street. The congregation was first organized on November 4, 1832, and the church building was built between 1835 and 1838, which makes it the oldest church in Tallahassee and the oldest building in Florida still used for its original purpose.

The building was designed to serve as a sanctuary for women and children during American Indian attacks. Rifle slots are built into the foundation but are not visible from outside. On September 9, 1974, it was added to the U.S. National Register of Historic Places.

Today, there are services every Sunday at 11:00 A.M. There are estimated to be several hundred members of the congregation, with average attendance of just over two hundred persons. The congregation is part of the Presbyterian Church (USA), and known for maintaining a progressive theological and social perspective through the years. Since 2008, First Presbyterian Church has been affiliated with The Covenant Network of Presbyterians, and supports the ordination of all qualified persons into both lay and ordained ministry regardless of sexual orientation. For the past several years, First Presbyterian Church has been a sponsor of Pridefest. In 2009, the "Light from Light" campaign was born. As a part of this program, solar panels were added to the building, making First Presbyterian one of only a few churches nationwide to generate a portion of its own electricity. As of 2010, First Presbyterian Church was home to the second largest solar panel array in Leon County.
