= James Henry Roper =

Florida state senator

James Henry Roper (c. 1835 – 1883) was an educator, state senator and school founder in Florida.

He moved to Gainesville in 1856. He represented Alachua County in the Florida Senate. He built Gainesville Academy in 1858. A few years later he offered it as a new site for East Florida Seminary and served as the school’s principal after its move. Gainesville competed with Lake City, home of Florida Agricultural College, for the newly organized University of Florida.

Gainesville’s Roper Park is named for him.
