= East Florida Seminary =

State institution of higher learning

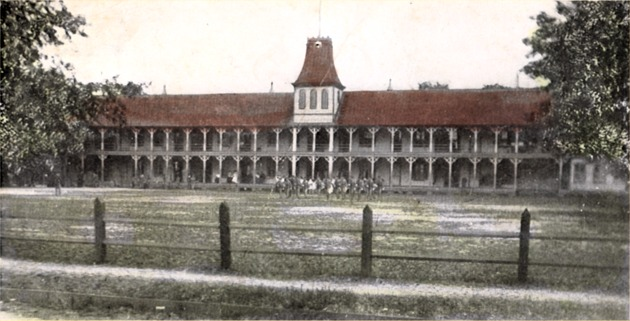
Wooden barracks or dormitory building for the East Florida Seminary

The East Florida Seminary was an institution of higher learning established by the state of Florida in 1853, and absorbed into the newly established University of Florida in 1905. The school operated in Ocala from 1853 until 1861. After being closed during the Civil War, the school re-opened in Gainesville in 1866. The school was intended to serve students from every county in Florida east of the Suwannee River, but functioned as a local public school for many years in Gainesville. The admission age was eventually raised, and it became a preparatory school.

== Early years in Ocala ==
In 1851, the Florida Legislature authorized the establishment of two "seminaries of learning", one to serve residents of counties to the east of the Suwannee River, and the other to serve residents of counties to the west of that river. Each county could send a number of students tuition-free to the appropriate seminary equal to the number of representatives sent from that county to the State Assembly. Alachua and Marion counties each petitioned the state to host the new seminary for eastern Florida. Alachua County offered $5,000 for the construction of buildings for the school. Marion County offered $1,600, land worth $5,000, and the existing buildings of the East Florida Independent Institute, a private school founded in 1852. In 1852 the legislature picked Ocala, in Marion County, as the site for the East Florida Seminary.

The East Florida Seminary opened in 1853, and in its first year had four teachers and about 60 students. The school admitted male and female students, and the curriculum included "all routine subjects", as well as art, Greek and Latin. Marion County did not provide any support for public education until 1857, and the Seminary, a few private schools, and tutors on some plantations were the only educational opportunities in the county. In 1858 the Seminary had 65 students. The school closed in 1861. It has been reported that all of the male faculty and students left the school to participate in the Civil War.

== The other East Florida Seminary ==
In 1852, prior to the establishment of the state sponsored East Florida Seminary in Ocala, another school called the East Florida Seminary, associated with the Florida Conference of the Methodist Episcopal Church, South, was established in Micanopy, Florida, in southern Alachua County. While most members of the Board of Trustees were Methodist clergy, there is no evidence that the conference ever assumed control of or provided any funding for the school. The school was explicitly described as "a 'literary' and not a 'theological' institution", that would not be teaching "Methodism". A two-story classroom building was erected. At one point the school had three teachers, which were later reduced to two. In 1855 the school had about 30 students, but the teachers had not been paid for a year. The school struggled on, closing in 1860. The citizens of Alachua County unsuccessfully petitioned the Florida Senate in 1856 to move the state-funded East Florida Seminary to Micanopy.

== Move to Gainesville ==
The East Florida Seminary did not reopen in Ocala after the end of the Civil War, and in 1866 the Florida Legislature passed an act moving the school to Gainesville. The Seminary was primarily a local public school for the next twenty years, with students mainly from Gainesville, ranging in age from four to twenty-four. Few students from other counties took advantage of the free tuition seats available, as the state tuition grants did not cover room and board.

== 1880s ==
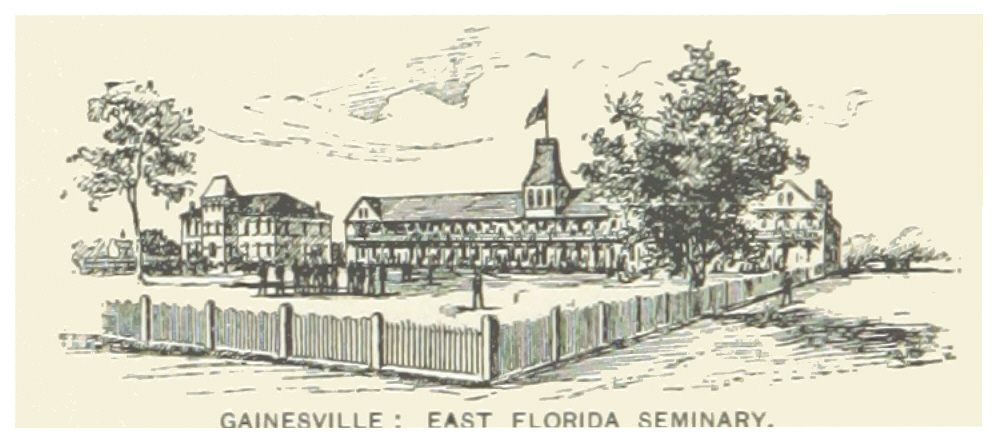
East Florida Seminary in 1891. Epworth Hall is on the left, with the dormitory in the middle and right

The wooden building used by the East Florida Seminary, described as "badly designed and poorly constructed", burned in 1883. The voters of Gainesville approved a bond issue that year to fund improvements at the Seminary and the Union Academy, which served African-American students in Gainesville. The Seminary received $6,000 from the bond issue, which was used on construction of a new two-story brick Academic Building. That building was used in 1905 by the newly organized University of Florida until buildings could be constructed on its new campus west of Gainesville. The building was deeded in 1911 to what is now the First United Methodist Church of Gainesville, and is now known as Epworth Hall.

The East Florida Seminary began awarding diplomas for completion of the English, commercial, classical and scientific courses in 1882. The seminary had a normal department for training teachers until the state created the Florida State Normal School in 1887. Starting in 1883 the Seminary had a military organization, with a training officer supplied by the U.S. Army. In 1886, the Florida Legislature appropriated $10,000 for the construction of a wooden dormitory (also called a barracks) at the Seminary, and $1,000 each for the years 1887 and 1888 to supplement the funds available from the Seminary Fund for the operation of the Seminary.

In 1885 the State of Florida paid Ocala $5,400 to settle claims for the money spent to provide facilities for the East Florida Seminary in 1853, in compensation for the school being moved to Gainesville in 1866.

The East Florida Seminary was "thoroughly graded" in 1887. The lower age limit was raised, and there were no students under the age of thirteen enrolled in the school by 1889. By that year, the Seminary was functioning as a preparatory school. The Seminary library had between 800 and 1,000 books. Of the 28 counties in Florida east of the Suwannee River, 21 had students at the Seminary.

== See also ==
- 1904 East Florida Seminary football team
