= Murphree =

Murphree is a surname. Notable people with the surname include:

- Albert A. Murphree (1870–1927), American college professor and university president
- Dennis Murphree (1886–1949), Mississippi politician
- Eger V. Murphree (1898–1962), American chemist, known for his co-invention of the process of fluid catalytic cracking
- Thomas Alexander Murphree (1883–1945), United States federal judge

== See also ==
- Murphree Area, historic residence hall complex on the University of Florida campus in Gainesville, Florida
- Murphree Hall, historic student residence building on the University of Florida campus in Gainesville, Florida
- Morph (disambiguation)
- Murfree
- Murph (disambiguation)
- Murphy
