= Murphree Area =

- Interactive map of the Murphree Area area

General information
- Type: Housing
- Location: Main campus, University of Florida, Gainesville, Florida, United States
- Coordinates: 29°39′4″N 82°20′45″W
- Groundbreaking: 1905
- Completed: 1939

Murphree Area is an historic residence hall complex on the northern edge of the University of Florida campus in Gainesville, Florida. The complex is adjacent to University Avenue, one of the major public roads that serve the university and define its boundaries. It was the university's first residence area and the last one to become co-ed. The Murphree Area complex is named for Albert A. Murphree, the second president of the university, who served from 1909 to 1927. It consists of the following five residence buildings, all built between 1905 and 1939:

- Buckman Hall (1906)
- Thomas Hall (1906)
- Sledd Hall (1929)
- Fletcher Hall (1939)
- Murphree Hall (1939)

== Early history (1906–1939) ==
Buckman Hall and Thomas Hall were the first two university buildings to be built, and were dedicated on September 27, 1906. Buckman Hall was named for Henry Holland Buckman, the member of the Florida Legislature who wrote the Buckman Act, which created the modern University of Florida in 1905. Thomas Hall was named for Gainesville mayor William Reuben Thomas who supported the donation of 517 acres (2.09 km^{2}) of land and $40,000 from Gainesville to the state so that the Florida Legislature would build the university in Gainesville rather than in Lake City.

The buildings are constructed of brick, have three and a half floors, and are late Gothic Revival-Tudorbethan in style. The buildings were designed by architect William Augustus Edwards of the firm of Edwards and Walters, then based in Columbia, South Carolina, and were built by Jacksonville-based contractor W.T. Hadlow at a cost of $75,250 per building.

Both buildings were designed for student housing but have served many uses, and in their early history were used to house the entire university. Buckman Hall contained a six-bed infirmary, gymnasium, and an apartment for a professor (the "officer-in-charge"). Thomas Hall contained administration offices in the north section, classrooms, laboratories, an auditorium, a library, a dining room, and a kitchen in the center sections, and an agricultural laboratory in the south section. Both buildings had hardwood floors and potbellied stoves (for which the university provided wood for students to burn). In 1906, students paid $2.50 in rent to live in the halls.

The collections of the Florida Museum of Natural History were for a time displayed at Thomas Hall.

In 1911, final plans were made for the construction of four additional buildings: an agriculture building (Floyd Hall), the University Commons Building (Cafeteria), the language hall (Anderson Hall), and the College of Education building (Peabody Hall). When these facilities were completed in fall 1913 (after a delay in funding for the Language Hall and Education Building), parts of Thomas Hall were left vacant, and Thomas Hall was renovated for use as a residence hall, opening in 1914.

== Later history (1940–2000) ==
In 1940, Thomas Hall was linked to Fletcher and Sledd Halls, forming a "UF" shape that can be seen from the air. From 1940 to 1949, the interiors of Buckman and Thomas Halls were renovated, and the wood structures were replaced by steel and concrete, at a cost estimated to be between $37,000 and $54,000.

In 1974, Thomas Hall was added to the National Register of Historic Places, with the register reading

1905–1906, Edwards and Walters, architects. Brick, 3½ stories, H-shaped, hipped and pitched roof sections; crenulated parapet interrupted by stepped gables placed over a division, each with its own entrance and bay window; regular fenestration, stone quoins, elaborate arched large stone scroll brackets; connected to another building at E end of S wing. Late Gothic Revival. One of first 2 buildings on University of Florida campus.

A press release issued when Thomas Hall was added to register told the story of the campus legend of "Old Steve," the ghost who haunts Murphree Area, the last all-male residence area (it was designated co-ed in 1972). According to the legend, "Old Steve" was the original head cook on campus who worked in the kitchen in the center of Thomas Hall, beneath the classrooms and library. The legend states that Old Steve disrupted the campus through his shouting and cursing at his kitchen crew, the banging of pots and pans, the hissing of steam, and the loud crackling of fire and pans as lunch was prepared—the same sounds heard when the steam heating system in the Murphree Area halls is turned on every fall.

== Present day (2001–present) ==
Increased electrical demands of students put heavy burdens on Thomas Hall, draining power and causing circuit overloads and thrown breakers, with four to six residents sharing a 15-amp service. In 2000, a $2.5 million four-year electrical upgrade project began with the aim of providing at least one 20-amp circuit per student. The project required total rewiring of the halls—from transformers to each outlet and switch—and the installation of a new 23,000-volt primary distribution switch.

In 2002, a $500,000 project to landscape the university’s historic area (the Murphree Area courtyard and University Avenue area) began when Florida alumni Herb and Catherine Yardley of Fort Lauderdale gave $250,000 to be matched by the university. Landscape architecture students at the university assisted in the design, which includes proposed sidewalks, landscaping plants and design, walls, and seating areas.

Thomas Hall is co-ed by section and occupied by 170 residents.

The Murphree Area is represented to UF's student government by the Murphree Area constituent seat.

== Murphree Area Council ==
Murphree Area Council
- Seal of MAC since 2021, not to be confused with its logo
- Abbreviation: MAC
- Formation: Circa 1958; 68 years ago
- President: Jeremy Kornmesser
- Vice President: Rhianna Burton
- Treasurer: Katherine Currence
- Affiliations: Inter-Residence Hall Association
- Budget: $5,000 (2025-2026)
- Website: Murphree Area Council

The Murphree Area Council (abbreviated as MAC) is a student organization that represents residents of the area to the Inter-Residence Hall Association and the University of Florida Department of Housing and Residence Life. The organization is one of 11 area governments (abbreviated as AGs) that represent individual areas of residence halls.

=== History ===
MAC is one of the oldest AGs, organizing sometime before 1958. MAC stems back to the first institutions organized to represent student residents, individual committees representing the five halls of the area, organized in 1949.

Fletcher Hall, in the Murphree Area, was the location of the founding of the first residence hall association at the University of Florida. This organization went on to be the origin of the current Inter-Residence Hall Association.

=== Operations ===
The organization, along with resident assistants, runs event programming in the Murphree Area (typically open to all students across campus), using funding given by the university's housing department. Among these are a number of traditional events that are held every year. This includes the annual Halloween event, Haunted Thomas.

== See also ==
- History of the University of Florida
- List of University of Florida buildings
- List of University of Florida presidents
- University of Florida Campus Historic District
- University of Florida student housing

== Gallery ==
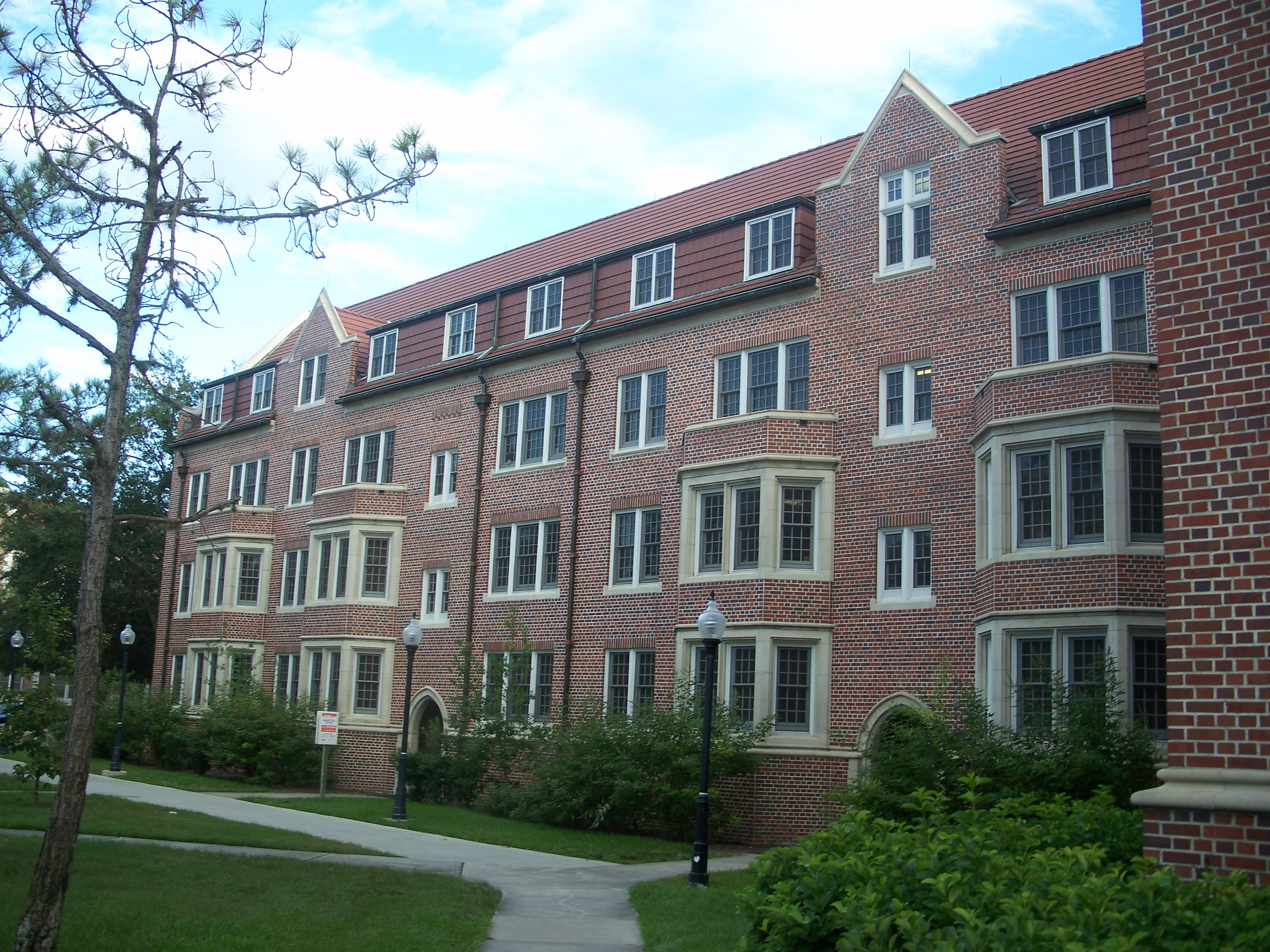
Murphree Hall

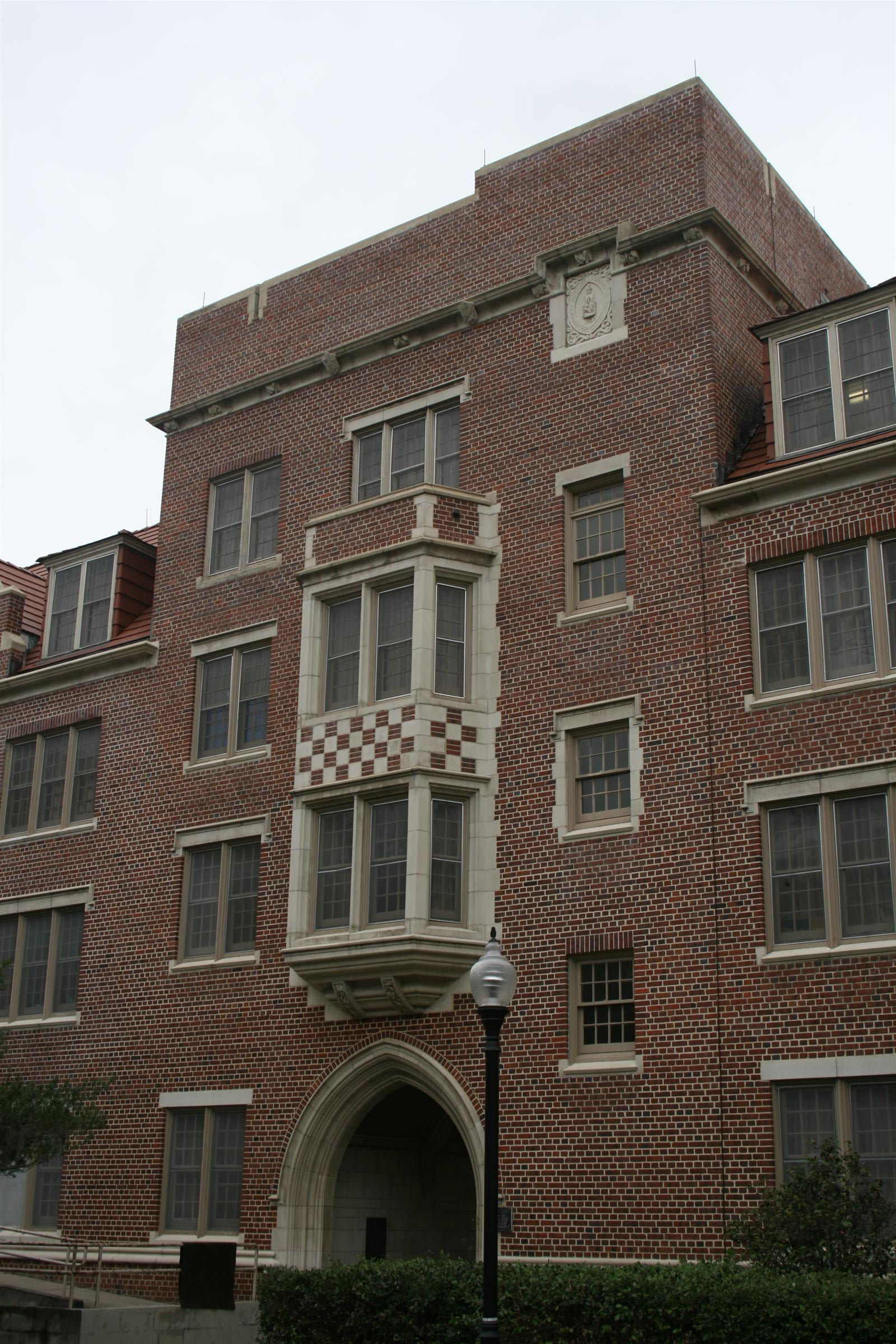
Fletcher Hall

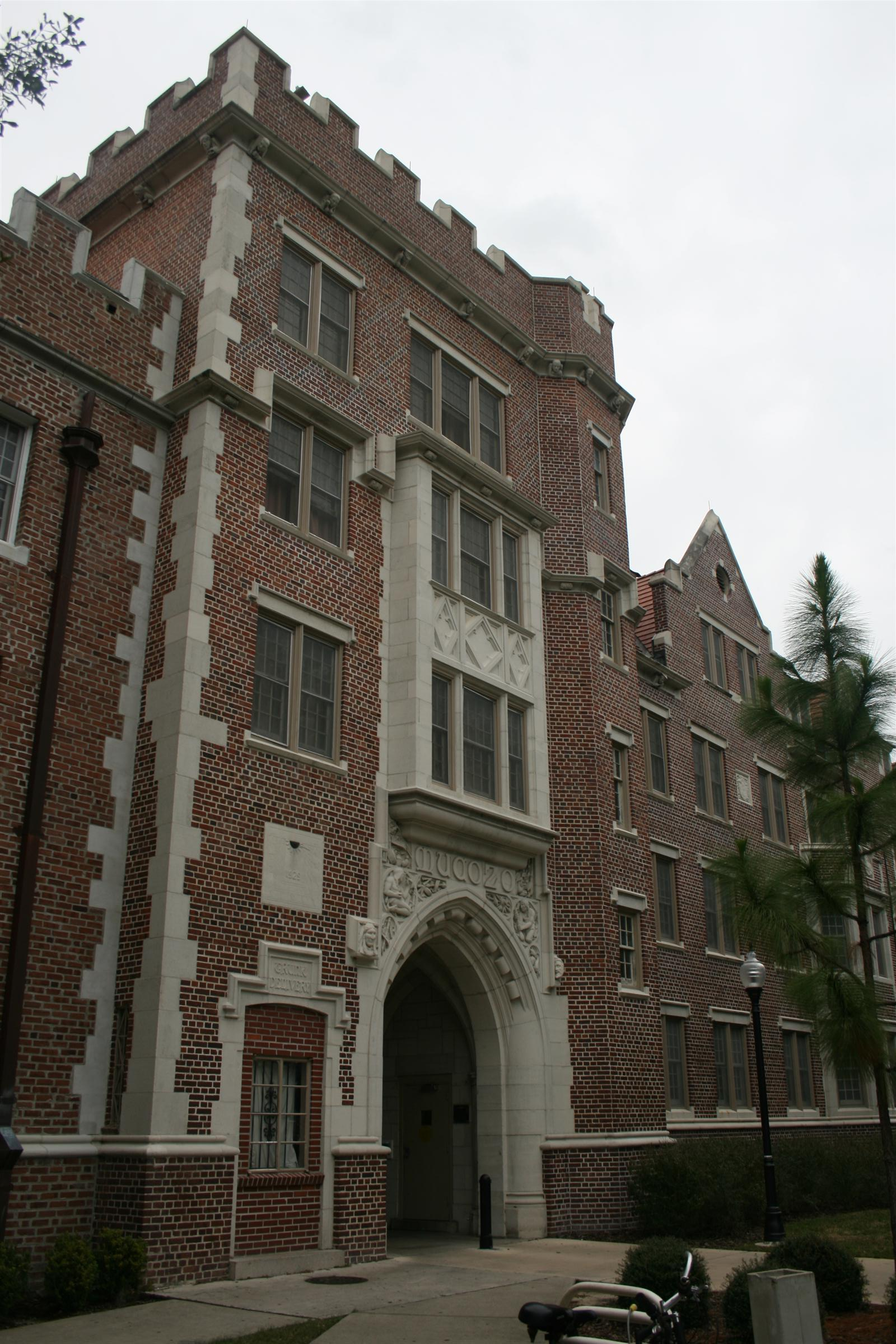
Sledd Hall

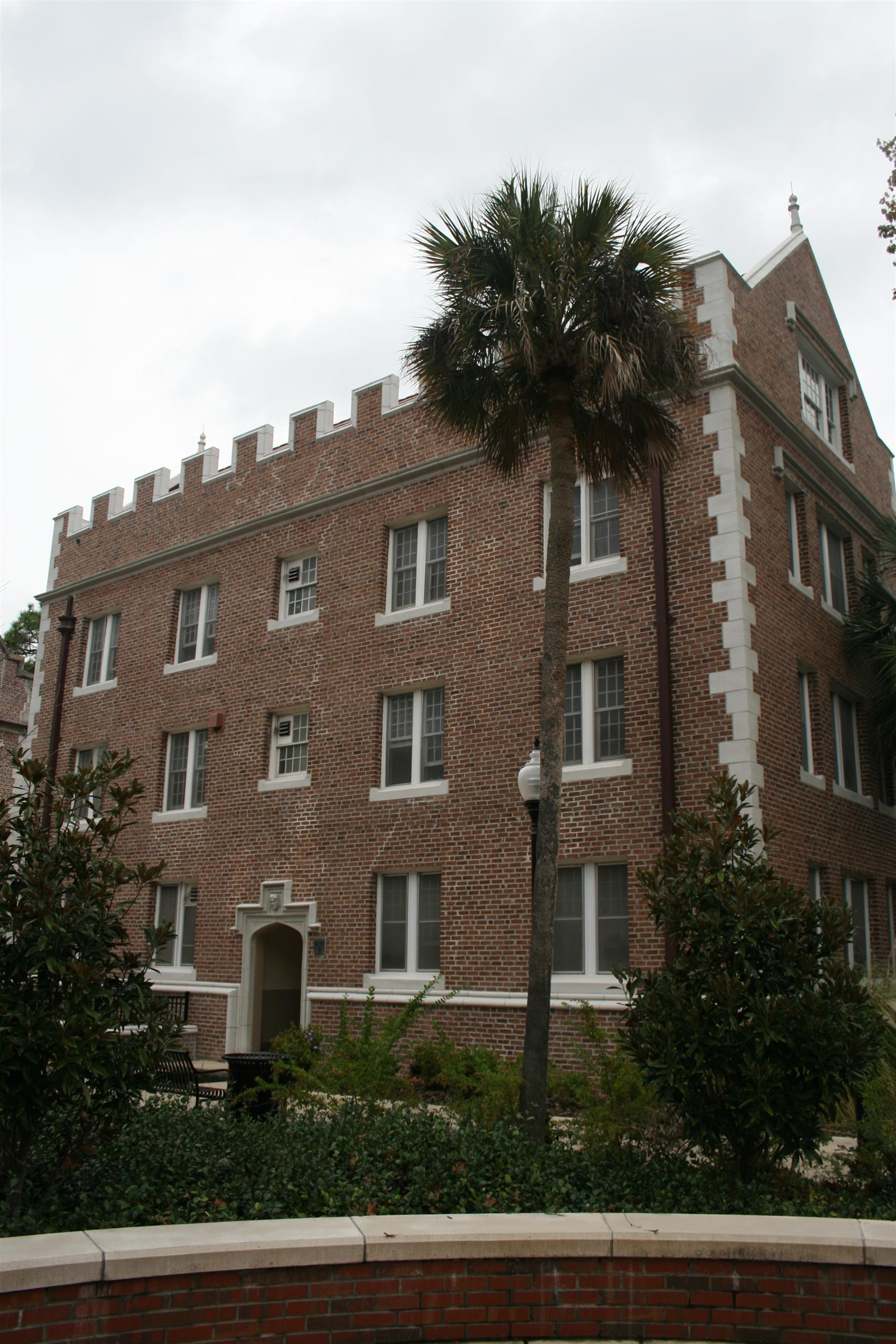
Buckman Hall

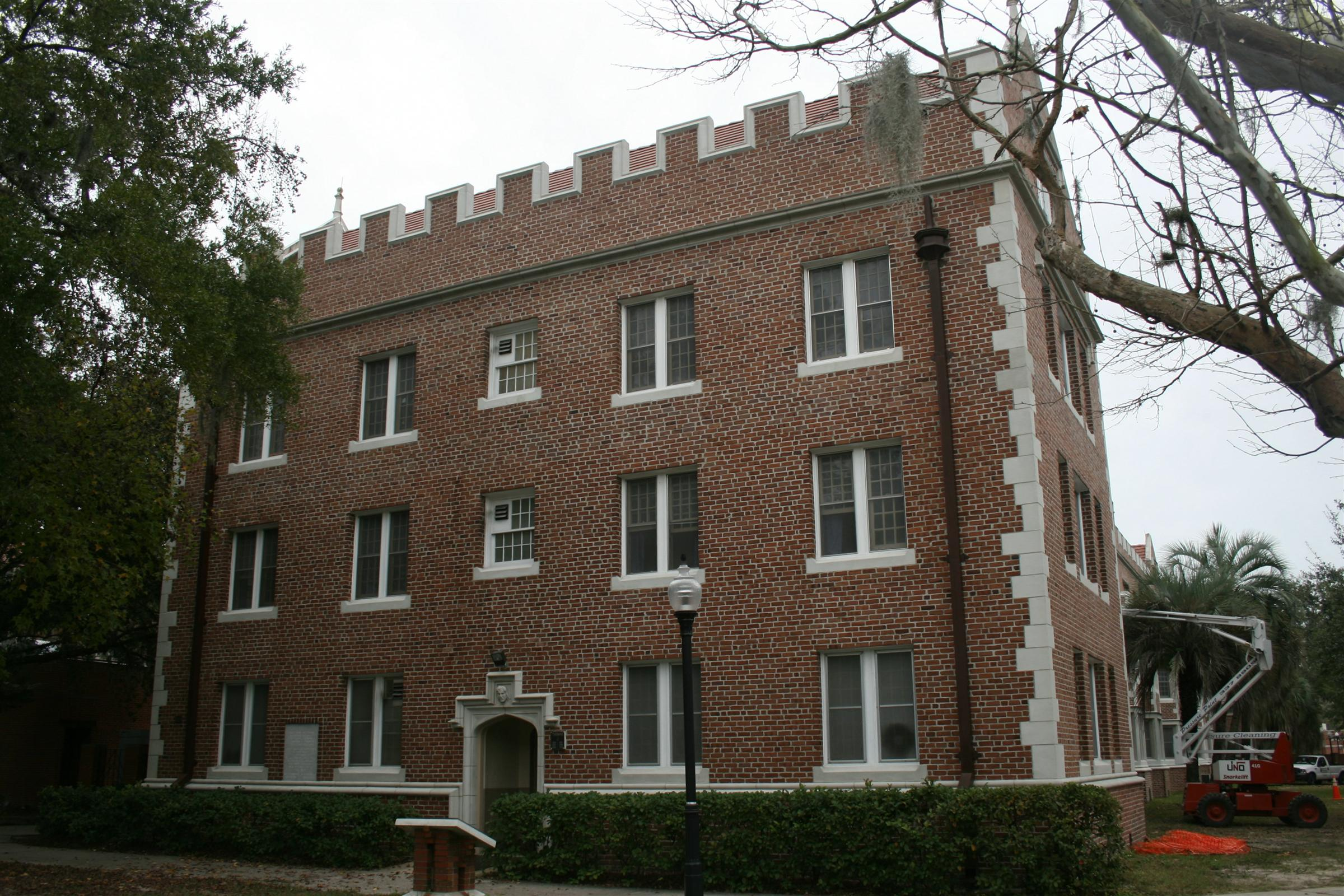
Thomas Hall
