= Fleming Field (Gainesville) =

Sports venue at the University of Florida

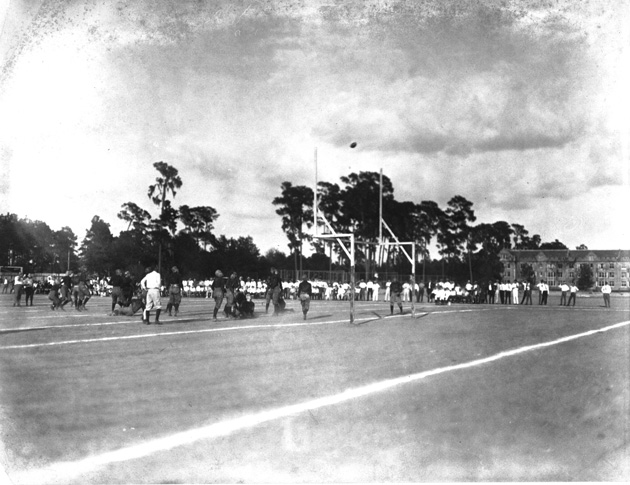
- A Gator football game at Fleming Field circa 1924
- Owner: University of Florida
- Operator: University Athletic Association

Construction
- Opened: 1911
- Closed: 1930 (football, track and field); 1948 (baseball)

Tenants
- Florida Gators football (1911–1930); Florida Gators baseball (1911–1948); Florida Gators track and field (1923–1931); Major League Baseball spring training (1916–1929)

Fleming Field (originally known as University Athletic Field) was the first on-campus home for the football and baseball teams representing the University of Florida in Gainesville. Construction began in 1910, and the facility debuted as the home field for Florida Gators outdoor sports programs during the spring semester of the 1910-1911 academic year.

University Athletic Field had limited spectator seating and primitive amenities when first opened. Larger bleachers were installed in 1915, when it was renamed "Fleming Field" in honor of a former governor of Florida, and a track for the university's new track and field program was added in 1923. However, its maximum capacity never exceeded about 5,000 with standing room, and as the Florida football program grew in national prominence during the 1920s, university leaders saw a need for a modern stadium.

Florida Field was constructed adjacent to Fleming Field in 1930 as the new home of the university's football and track programs, and the baseball team moved to nearby Perry Field in 1949. Fleming Field continued to be used for general student recreation until 1991, when a major expansion of the north endzone of Florida Field extended the structure well onto the Gators' old playing surface.

Today, the remaining portion of Fleming Field is the landscaped northern approach to Ben Hill Griffin Stadium. On football gamedays, the grassy area is used for parking and tailgating, and the brick walkway cutting across Fleming Field is the site of the pregame Gator Walk.

== Earlier facilities ==
The modern University of Florida was established in 1905 and first held classes in Gainesville in the fall of 1906. The new campus had limited facilities, however, with additional construction continuing as funding allowed.

The university established an intercollegiate football program and a club-level baseball team immediately upon opening of its new campus. Since the school did not yet have its own athletic facilities, these teams began play at a Gainesville city park known simply as "The Ballpark", which they used until the end of the 1910 football season.

== Home of the Gators ==
In 1910, the university cleared and leveled a plot of land along University Avenue adjoining the Murphree student housing area on the western edge of the existing campus, just north of the present stadium site. With the installation of wooden bleachers purchased from the city of Gainesville and transported from the old downtown ballpark, University Athletic Field was unveiled as the new home of UF's baseball team in January 1911. The 1911 football team was the first to adopt the nickname "Gators" and the formerly club-level baseball team became an officially sanctioned intercollegiate program during the 1912 spring semester, making University Athletic Field the first true "home of the Gators". Larger bleachers were added in the summer of 1915, and in October 1915, the facility was rechristened "Fleming Field" in honor of recently deceased former Florida governor Francis P. Fleming. In 1923, a compact running track was added to accommodate the university's new track and field program.

Florida's football squads posted a 49–7–1 home record during the University Athletic / Fleming Field era, which spanned from 1911 to the first few games of the 1930 season. However, due to the facility's limited capacity (approximately 5,000 with temporary bleachers and standing room) and the relative inaccessibility of Gainesville in the early 20th century, most "home" games against top opponents were scheduled at larger venues in Jacksonville or Tampa, with a few also played in St. Petersburg or Miami.

Gator football first earned national prominence in the 1920s, prompting incoming university president John J. Tigert to begin a drive to construct a new and larger stadium upon his arrival in 1928. With an initial capacity of 22,000, Florida Field was completed adjacent to Fleming Field in the fall of 1930 and has been the home stadium for Florida football ever since. A year later, a larger running track was constructed just beyond Florida Field's open south endzone, and the track team relocated to the new facility.

Florida's baseball team continued to use Fleming Field until 1949, when the university constructed Perry Field nearby. Perry Field at Alfred A. McKethan Stadium remained the home field of Florida baseball until 2020, when the program moved to a new ballpark on the southwest side of campus.

== Major League spring training ==
Besides the university's sports teams, Fleming Field intermittently hosted Major League Baseball spring training games and practices featuring many teams including the Boston Red Sox, New York Giants, Philadelphia Athletics, Philadelphia Phillies and Boston Braves from 1916 until 1929. This was an era in which major league teams usually prepared for the regular season by playing exhibition games in several towns instead of establishing a spring training base in one location as is now the case. Among the baseball notables to appear at Fleming Field were Babe Ruth, Mel Ott, Walter Johnson, Rogers Hornsby, and Casey Stengel. The Gators' most notable baseball player of the era was Lance Richbourg, who played over a decade in the majors and returned to coach Florida's baseball team for three seasons during the Fleming Field era.

The university used the proceeds earned by hosting spring training to help finance several capital projects, including construction on the University Gym, the first permanent home of the Florida Gators basketball program.

== Post-football uses ==
Aerial view of Fleming Field (top with baseball diamond) and Florida Field, late 1930s

The Gator baseball program continued to play and practice on the baseball diamond on the western half of Fleming Field for almost two decades after the completion of Florida Field while racquetball and tennis courts were built on the eastern half. The baseball team moved to new facilities at Perry Field in 1949, and for the following decades, Fleming Field was used for physical education classes, intramural sports, general student recreation, and football gameday parking.

In 1991, the university added an upper deck to the north stands of Florida Field, extending the stadium structure across an existing street and onto Fleming Field. The street and courts were removed, infiltration basins were added, and the area was landscaped with trees, sidewalks, and a life-size alligator sculpture.

The former location of Fleming Field is now the main approach to Ben Hill Griffin Stadium at Steve Spurrier - Florida Field. On football game days, the remaining open area is used for tailgating and parking while the brick sidewalk cutting through the approximate center of the Gators' old home field is the site of the Gator Walk, in which the football team and coaches are greeted by thousands of fans as they make their way into the stadium.

=== Photo gallery ===
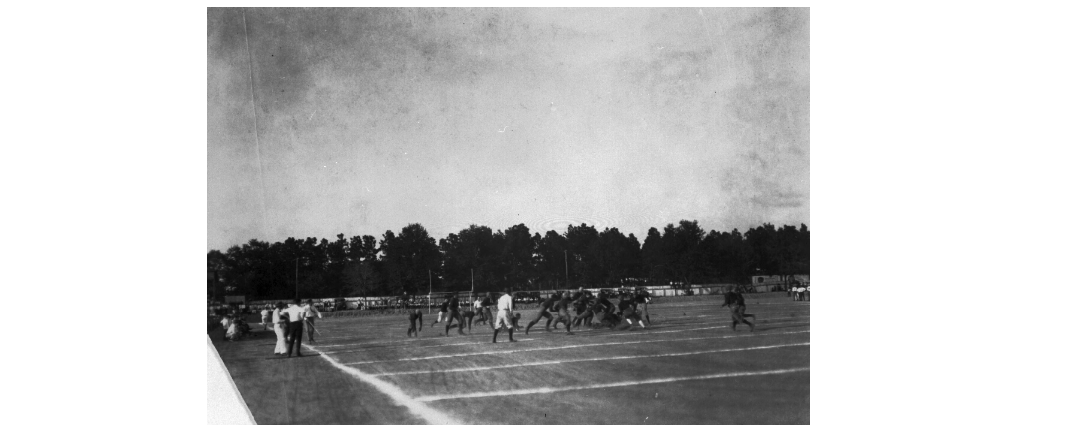
Football game at Fleming Field, c.1920

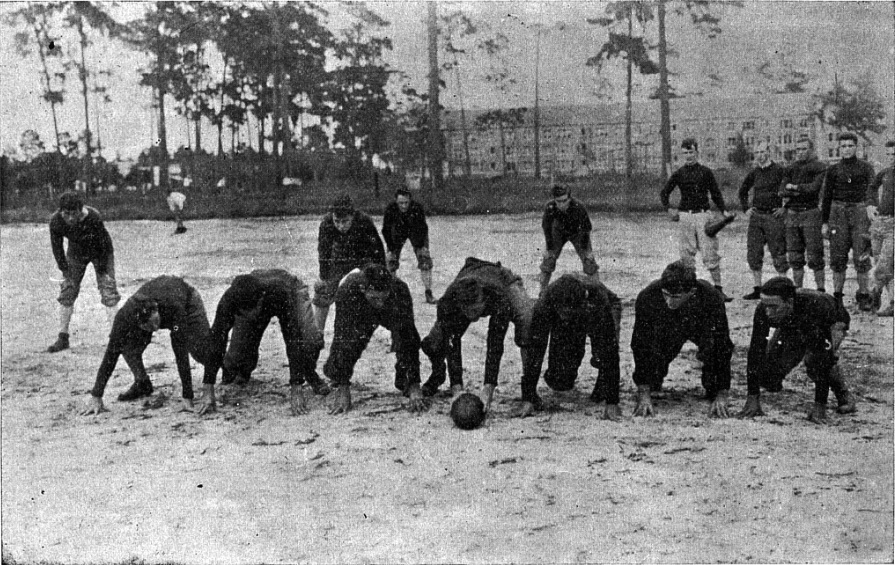
Football practice at University Athletic Field, 1912. Note Thomas Hall in the background

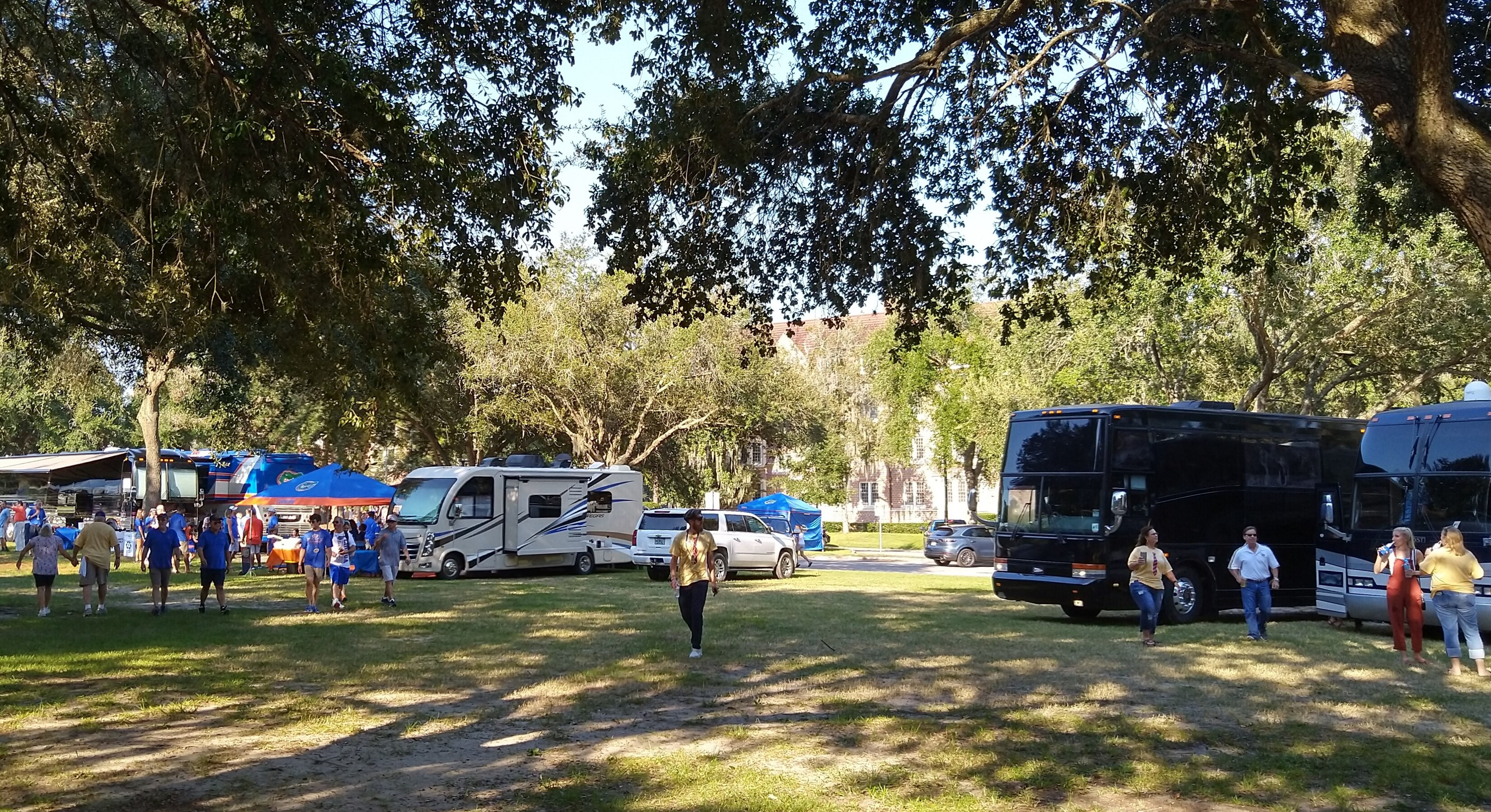
Pregame tailgating, 2019. Note Thomas Hall through the trees, background center

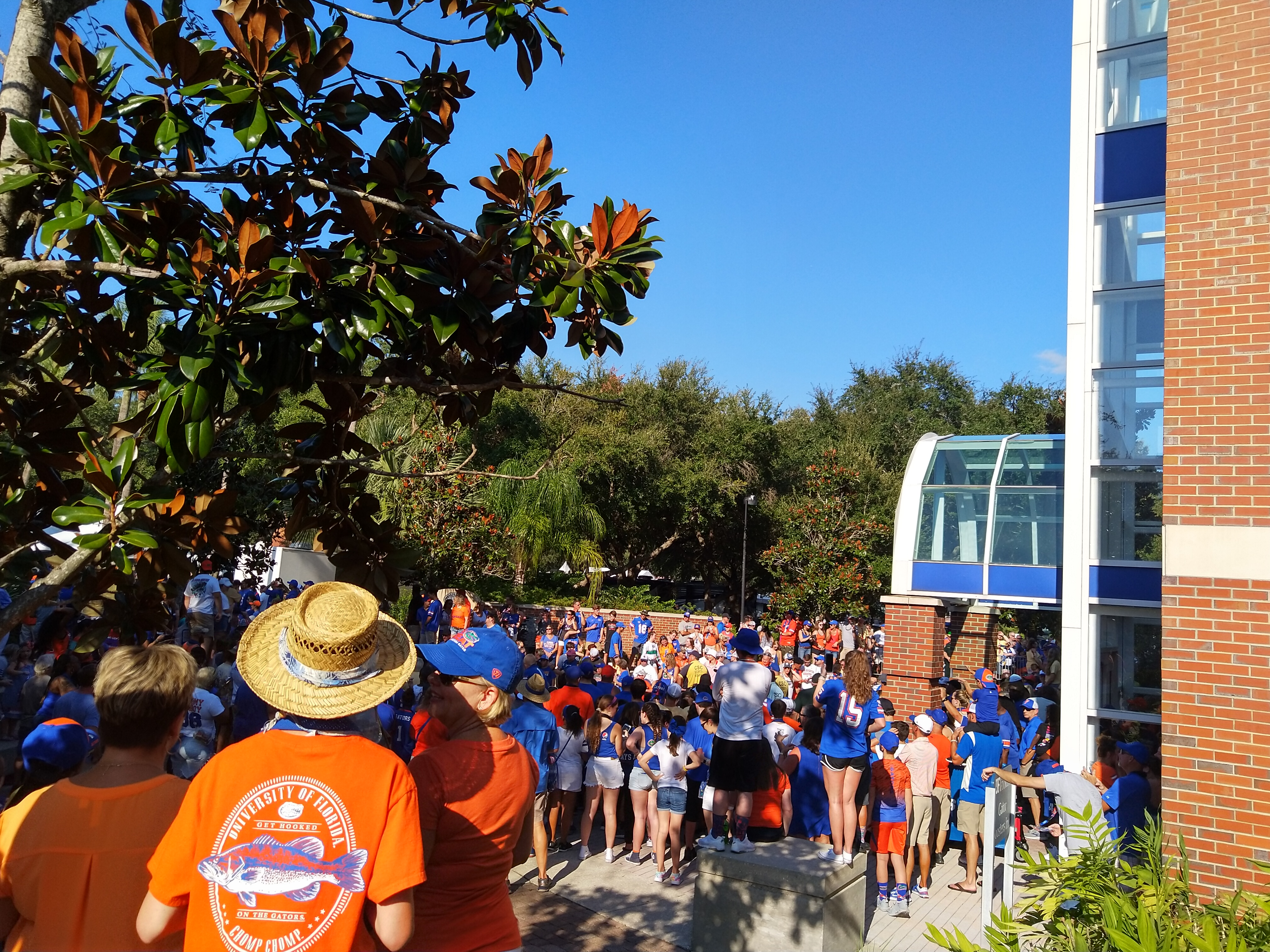
The Gator Walk at former site of Fleming Field in 2019, Ben Hill Griffin Stadium on right
