= Sledd Hall =

Coordinates: 29.6505768°N 82.3453447°W

- U.S. Historic district Contributing property
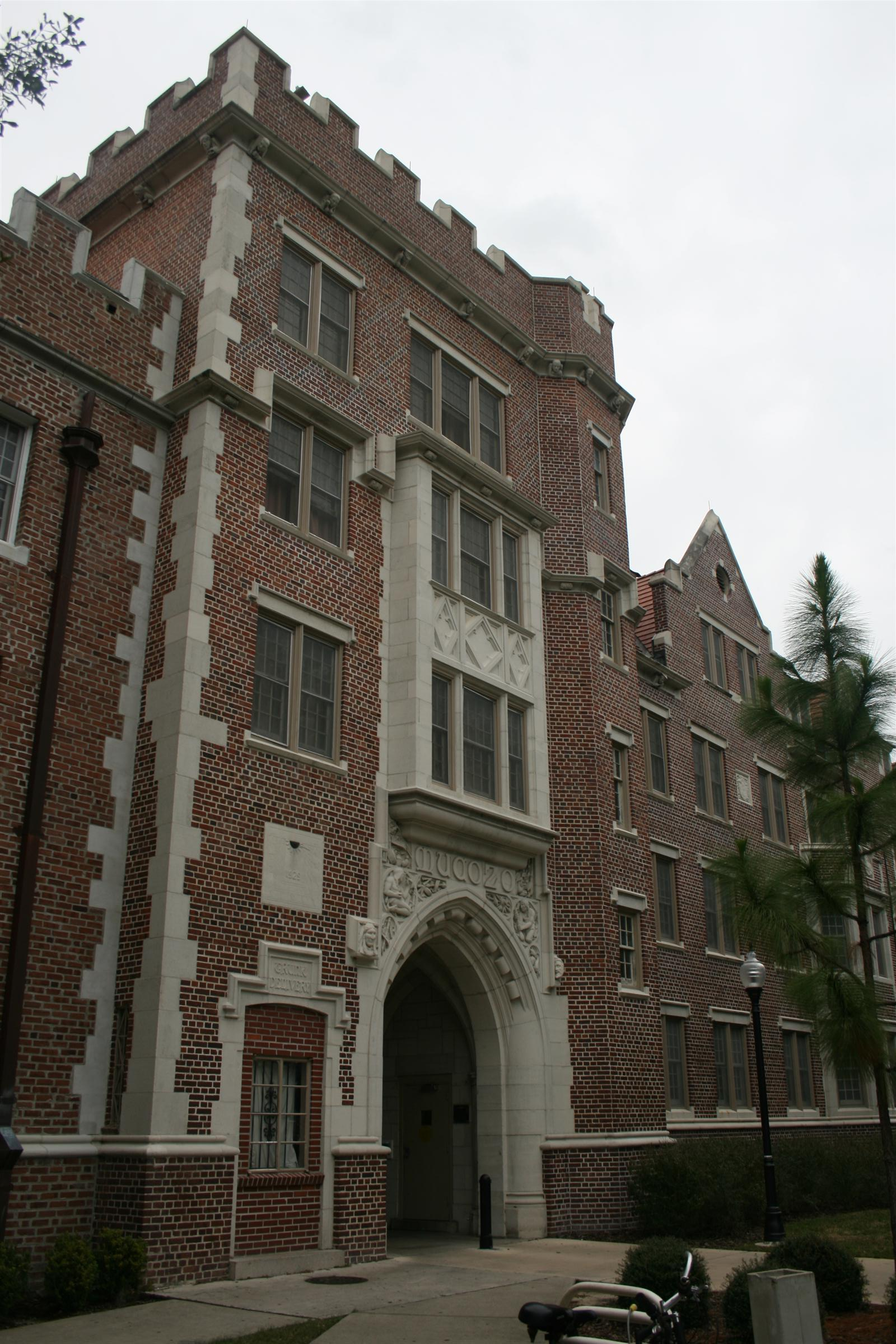
- Location: Gainesville, Florida
- Built: 1929

Sledd Hall is a historic student residence building in Murphree Area on the northern edge of the University of Florida campus in Gainesville, Florida. Built in 1929, the dormitory was designed by architect Rudolph Weaver in the Collegiate Gothic style. It is a contributing property in the University of Florida Campus Historic District.

Sledd Hall was dedicated to the university's first president, Andrew Sledd, who served from 1905 to 1909. For the first ten years of its existence, the building was known as "New Dormitory," and it was renamed following Sledd's death in 1939.

Sledd Hall is one of several University of Florida buildings that appear in the Sean Connery film Just Cause as a stand-in for the campus of Harvard University.

== See also ==
- History of the University of Florida
- List of University of Florida buildings
- List of University of Florida presidents
- University of Florida Campus Historic District
- University of Florida student housing
