= James Farr =

James Farr may refer to:

- James M. Farr, American university professor and academic administrator
- James Farr (basketball), American basketball player
- Jim Farr, Major League Baseball pitcher

== See also ==
- Jamie Farr, American television and film comedian and theatre actor
