= Buckman Hall (Gainesville, Florida) =

- U.S. National Register of Historic Places
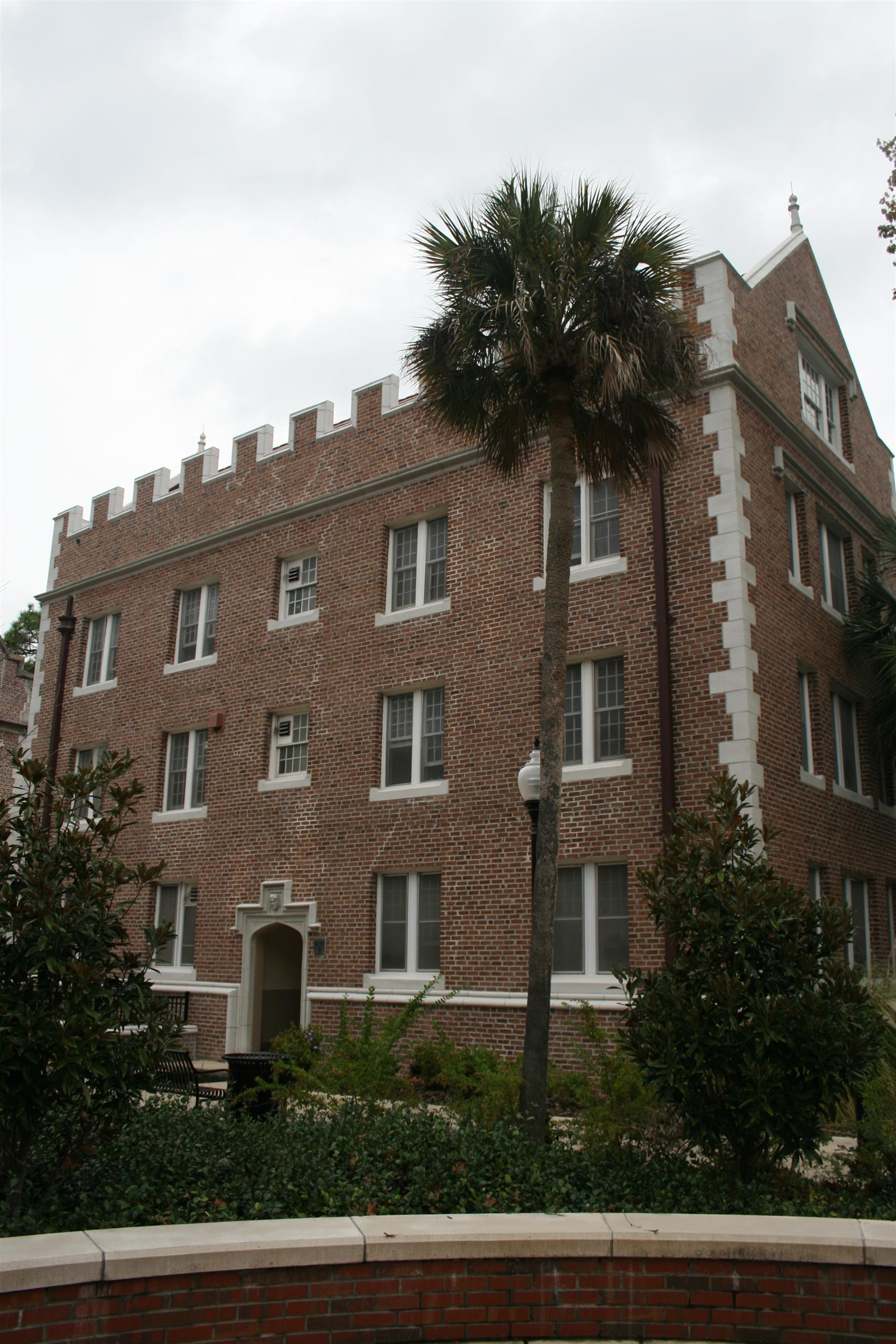
- Buckman Hall, University of Florida

- Location within Florida Location within the United States
- Location: 132 Buckman Drive on the University of Florida campus, Gainesville, Florida
- Coordinates: 29°39′2″N 82°20′43″W
- Built: 1905-06
- Architect: William Augustus Edwards of Edwards & Walters;
- Architectural style: Collegiate Gothic
- NRHP reference No.: 74000609
- Added to NRHP: 11 January 1974

Buckman Hall is a historic building located in Murphree Area on the University of Florida campus in Gainesville, Florida, United States. It was designed by architect William A. Edwards in the Collegiate Gothic style and opened in 1906 as one of the two original buildings on the University of Florida's Gainesville campus along with nearby Thomas Hall. It once was a multi-purpose facility but has been used exclusively as a student dormitory since the 1940s.

Buckman Hall was added to the U.S. National Register of Historic Places on January 11, 1974.

== History ==
=== Background / Multipurpose building ===
In June 1905, the Florida legislature passed the Buckman Act, which reorganized the state's university system and established a new University of Florida in Gainesville. Construction at the site began in late 1905 with a planned opening for the 1906-1907 academic year. The first two buildings completed were Buckman Hall, which was named for Buckman Act author Henry Holland Buckman, and Thomas Hall, which was named for Gainesville mayor William Reuben Thomas. When the first students arrived in September 1906, Buckman and Thomas Halls were home to all functions of the school, including classrooms, dormitories, and administrative offices. Buckman Hall housed the university's first cafeteria, gymnasium, and infirmary. Andrew Sledd, UF's first president, also lived there for a time.

=== Dormitory ===
The university's campus grew along with its enrollment in the early 20th century, and newer buildings gradually took over many of the former functions of Buckman Hall. It has been used exclusively as a dormitory since the University of Florida became co-educational following World War II.

Buckman Hall functioned as a student cooperative dormitory from 1974 until 2003. In exchange for lower rental rates, students performed most day-to-day maintenance such as general housekeeping and minor repairs. Residents also elected student officers who had the authority to make decisions concerning many aspects of residence hall life in addition to the duties of resident assistants living in conventional on-campus housing. The cooperative program lost popularity with students over the years, and Buckman Hall became a regular dorm for the spring 2003 semester.

==== Air conditioning ====
Buckman Hall and Thomas Hall were the first two buildings to open on the UF campus, and they remain the last without central air conditioning. Due to Buckman Hall's old wiring, even portable air conditioning units were not allowed for many years, and students often cooled their rooms by running a box fan in an open window.

As part of an extensive renovation project during the 2006-2007 academic year, Buckman Hall's electrical infrastructure was completely replaced to better handle loads from computers and other modern electronics. These improvements also made it possible for residents to utilize portable air conditioning units beginning with the fall 2007 semester. Ductless air conditioning units were installed in every room in 2013, eliminating the need for students to purchase their own.

== See also ==
- Buildings at the University of Florida
- History of the University of Florida
- University of Florida
- Campus Historic District
- University of Florida student housing
