= Murphree Hall =

Coordinates: 29.6513022°N 82.3465242°W

- U.S. Historic district – Contributing property
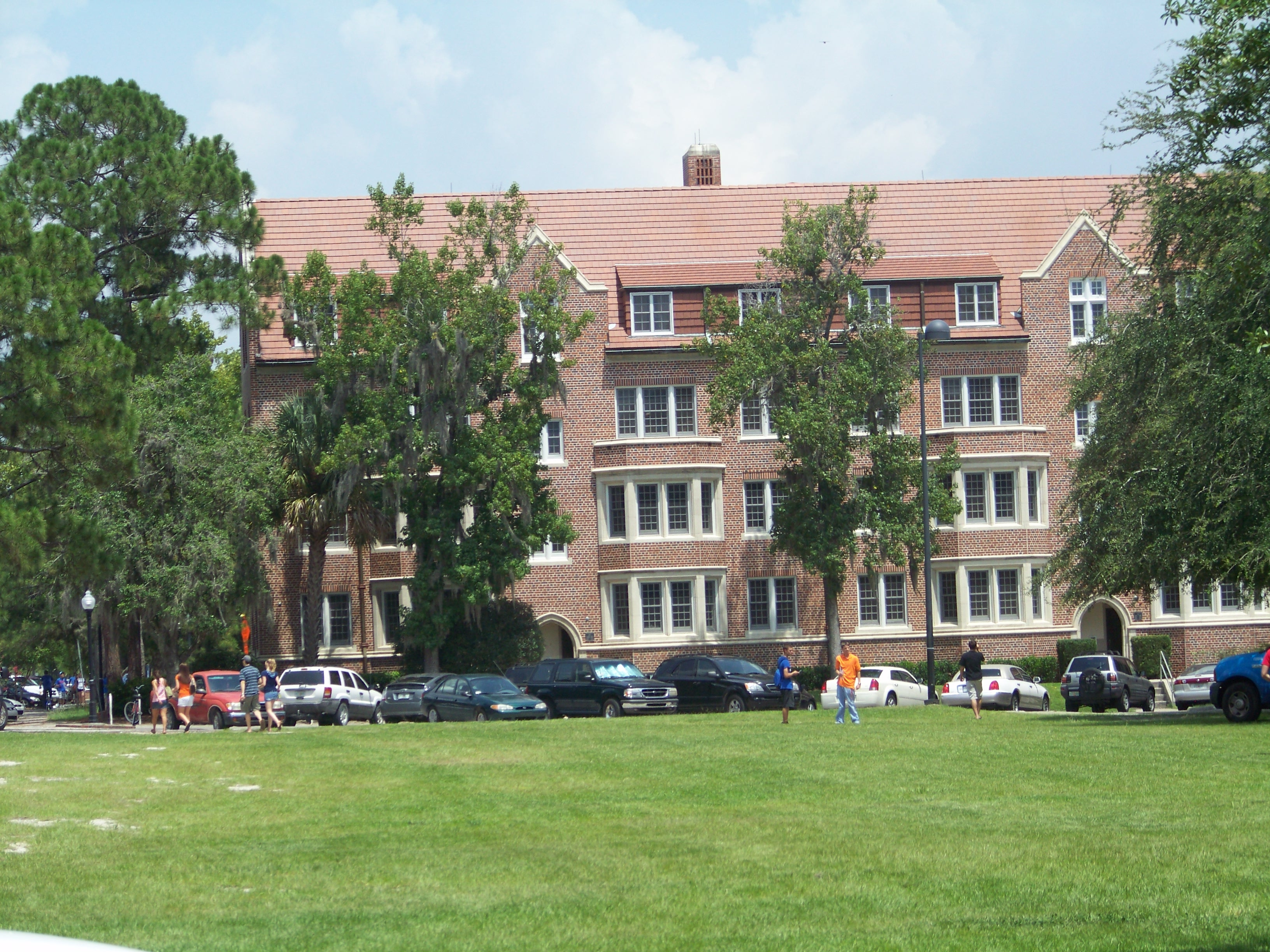

- Location within Florida
- Location: Gainesville, Florida
- Built: 1939
- Architect: Rudolph Weaver
- Architectural style: Late Gothic Revival

Murphree Hall is a historic student residence building located in the Murphree Area on the northern edge of the University of Florida campus in Gainesville, Florida. It was designed by architect Rudolph Weaver in the Collegiate Gothic style and completed in 1939. The building was named for Albert A. Murphree, the university's second president, who served from 1909 to 1927. Major renovations, which included adding air conditioning, were completed in 2005, and the hall was rededicated and open for that fall semester.

Murphree Hall is a contributing property in the University of Florida Campus Historic District which was added to the National Register of Historic Places on April 20, 1989.

== See also ==
- History of the University of Florida
- List of University of Florida buildings
- List of University of Florida presidents
- University of Florida Campus Historic District
- University of Florida student housing
