= Thomas Center =

United States historic place in Gainesville, Florida

- Hotel Thomas
- U.S. National Register of Historic Places
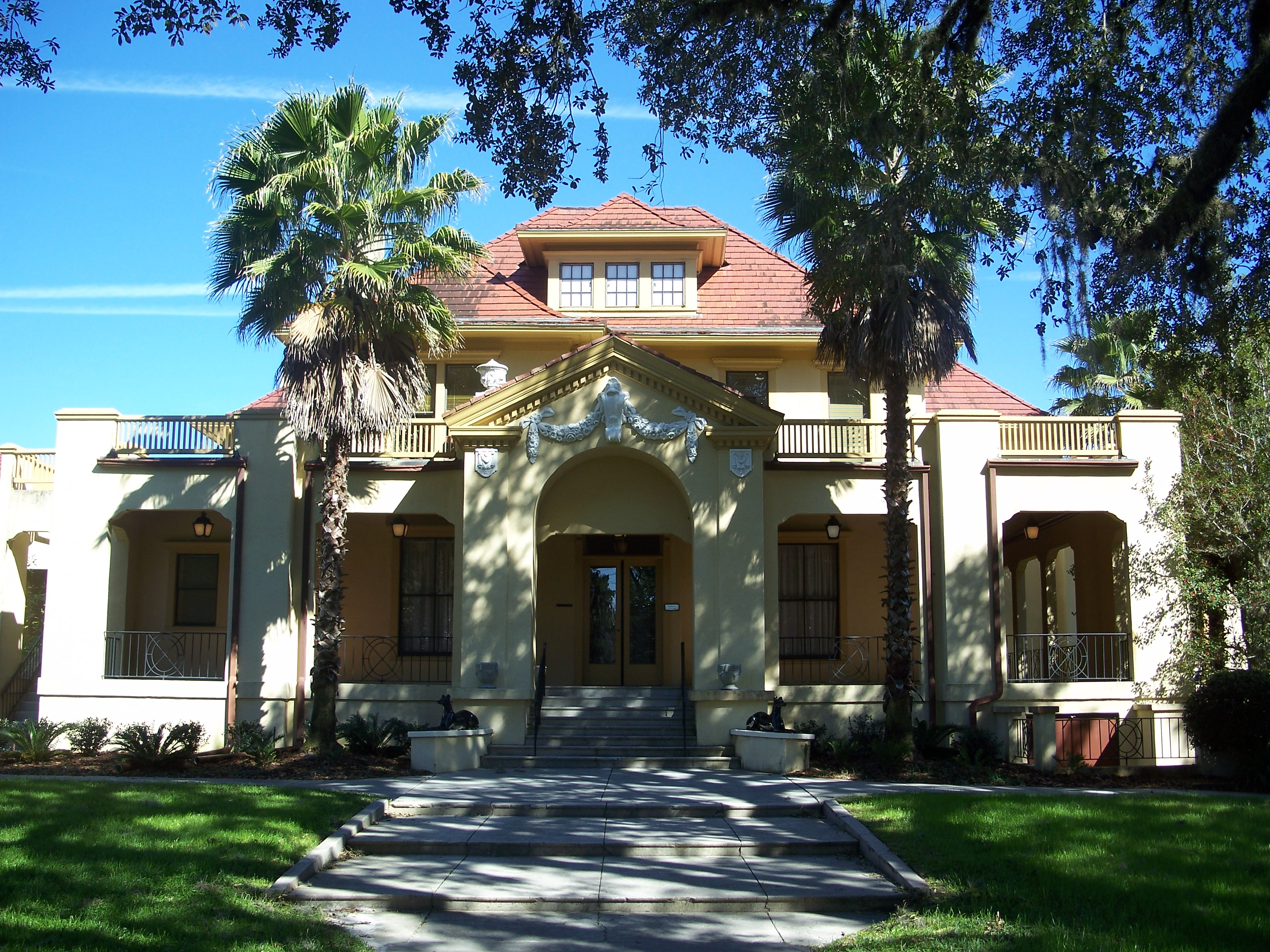
- Western entrance to the Thomas Center

- Location within Florida Location within the United States
- Location: 302 NE 6th Ave., Gainesville, Florida
- Coordinates: 29.6573°N 82.3220°W
- Built: 1910
- Architect: William Augustus Edwards
- Architectural style: Classical Revival
- NRHP reference No.: 73000563
- Added to NRHP: July 16, 1973

The Thomas Center, formerly known as Hotel Thomas and Sunkist Villa, is an historic building in Gainesville, Florida, United States. It was built starting in 1910 in the Classical Revival style by noted Atlanta-based architect, William Augustus Edwards, designer of academic buildings at 12 institutions in Georgia, South Carolina and Florida, including the original University of Florida campus, as well as a dozen or more county courthouses in those states plus other building and houses,

The building began as the private home of William Reuben Thomas, his wife Kathryn, and their five children, when it was known as Sunkist Villa. In 1928 Thomas more than doubled the size of the home and converted it to a hotel. The building was added to the U.S. National Register of Historic Places on July 16, 1973, and in the following years it underwent a restoration and adaption that involved significant repairs to the structure and replacement of the original Ludowici tiles.

The Thomas Center celebrated its 100th anniversary on February 12, 2010.

== Thomas Center ==
Today the Thomas Center serves as a local art and cultural center, and is the home for the Gainesville Cultural Affairs Division. The Thomas Center Galleries feature changing exhibits of art. The center also features 1920s period rooms, local history exhibits, a performance space, banquet rooms, and meeting rooms.
