= James M. Farr =

American university professor and academic administrator

- University of Florida Vice President; James M. Farr, circa 1920.
- Born: February 4, 1874; Union, South Carolina, U.S.
- Died: March 4, 1958 (aged 84); Jacksonville, Florida, U.S.
- Education: A.B., Davidson College, 1894; A.M., Davidson College, 1895; Ph.D., Johns Hopkins, 1901
- Occupations: University Professor; University Administrator
- Employer(s): Florida Agricultural College; University of Florida at Lake City; University of Florida
- Spouse: Anita Nicholson Harris Farr

James Marion Farr (February 4, 1874 – March 4, 1958) was an American university professor and academic administrator. Farr was a native of South Carolina, and earned bachelor's, master's and doctorate degrees before beginning his career as a professor of English language and literature. He was the interim president of the University of Florida from 1927 until 1928, and also served as the university's first vice president from 1905 to 1934.

== Early life and education ==
Farr was born in Union, South Carolina in 1874. He was the son of a Confederate infantry captain who had returned home from fighting in the Civil War to become a planter and banker. His mother died when he was two years old, and he was raised by his father and maternal grandmother. His earliest vivid memories were his mother's death and a parade of the Red Shirts. Farr attended public and private schools until he entered the South Carolina Military Academy (The Citadel) in 1889. He received an "honorable discharge" from the academy in 1890, and, thereafter, continued his studies at Davidson College in Davidson, North Carolina. While he was a student, he became a member of Sigma Alpha Epsilon Fraternity (North Carolina Theta Chapter). Farr earned his Bachelor of Arts degree from Davidson in 1894 and was the salutatorian of his class. He subsequently earned his Master of Arts degree from Davidson in 1895. He entered the English doctoral program at Johns Hopkins University in Baltimore, Maryland in the fall of 1895, wrote a dissertation entitled Intensives and Reflexives in Anglo-Saxon and Early Middle-English, and graduated with his doctor of philosophy degree in English language in 1901.

Farr married the former Anita Nicholson Harris in 1901, and the couple had two daughters, Jane and Anita, and an infant son who did not survive.

== Academic career ==
After completing his doctorate, Farr became a professor of English language and literature, the head of English instruction, and later the vice president at one of the University of Florida's four predecessor institutions, Florida Agricultural College (FAC) in Lake City, Florida, from 1901 to 1905. Farr was also the head coach of the FAC "blue and white" college football team for two seasons in 1901 and 1902. Farr was only moderately successful as a football coach, posting a 1–2–1 record in two seasons. During Farr's tenure, the FAC blue and white's sole victory was a 6–0 decision over Florida State College, the predecessor of the modern Florida State University, in 1902.

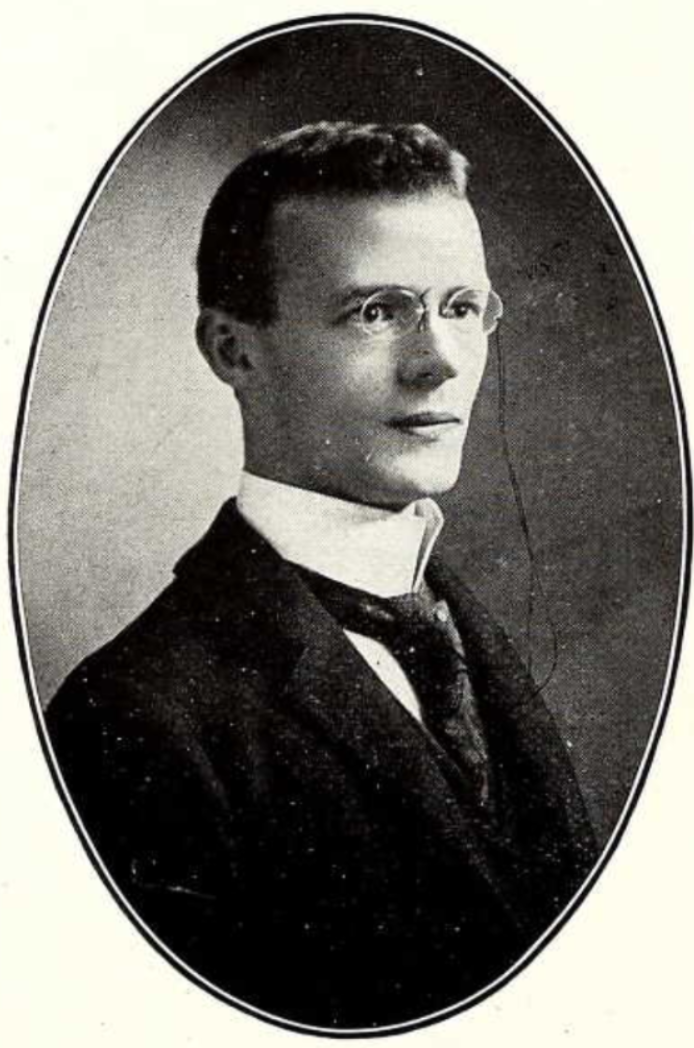
Farr from the 1911 Seminole yearbook

As a member of the college's faculty, Farr was actively involved with advocating the consolidation of the State of Florida's several publicly supported institutions of higher learning, and organized a letter-writing campaign to newspapers throughout the state, extolling the merits of consolidation. After the Florida Legislature, in 1905, mandated the merger of Florida Agricultural College with three other state-supported institutions to create the new University of the State of Florida located in Gainesville, Florida, Farr became a professor of English language and literature and the chairman of the new university's Department of English. (In 1909, the new university's name was shortened to the "University of Florida.")

As part of one of his first English classes at the new university, Farr implemented an honor system in 1905. Other faculty members thought the honor system was a good idea, and began to implement it in their own classes on an ad hoc basis. In 1914, the students requested the creation of a school-wide honor code, and university president Albert A. Murphree and the Florida Board of Control approved the concept in 1916.

During the three years from 1916 to 1919, Farr took an outspoken stand on the Southern racial issues of the day by signing a series of four published letters addressed to Southern college students. He wrote the letters, together with ten other professors from the universities of Alabama, Arkansas, Georgia, Mississippi, North Carolina, South Carolina, Tennessee and Texas, as well as Louisiana State University and Virginia Military Institute, under the rubric of the "University Commission on Race Questions," in an attempt to influence the opinions of the younger generation of Southern college students as future opinion leaders. The four letters addressed lynching, migration, education and a "new Reconstruction."

Farr also served as the first vice president of the University of Florida from its inception in 1905 until his retirement, and it fell upon him to lead the university through the world-wide influenza epidemic of 1918 when president Murphree was incapacitated with the illness. Hundreds of the university's students and faculty fell ill with the deadly "Spanish flu," and although one professor and several students died, the university was fortunate to suffer few fatalities.

He became the acting, or interim, president upon the unexpected death of president Murphree in December 1927. He served as the university's interim president until his permanent successor, John J. Tigert, assumed office in September 1928. In his role as the university's first vice president, Farr ultimately served under three different university presidents—Andrew Sledd, Murphree and Tigert.

After retiring from the university's faculty because of illness in 1934, Farr and his wife moved to Jacksonville Beach, Florida. He was placed on "special status" and commissioned by the university and Board of Control to write several manuscripts between 1935 and 1941. These writings included an unpublished manuscript of his personal reminiscences of the University of Florida and its predecessor institution, Florida Agricultural College, entitled The Making of a University, and covering the years 1901 to 1934.

== Legacy ==
Farr died in 1958. He was one of the University of Florida's last living links to the generation that was responsible for the university's creation in 1905. Farr's unpublished manuscript, The Making of a University, provides a first-hand account of the politics surrounding the creation of the university, and serves as one of the primary sources regarding the university's early history from its inception in 1905 through his retirement in 1934.

Farr was survived by his wife and daughters.

== See also ==
- History of Florida
- History of the English language
- History of the University of Florida
- List of alumni of The Citadel, The Military College of South Carolina
- List of Davidson College alumni
- List of Johns Hopkins University people
- List of Sigma Alpha Epsilon members
- List of University of Florida faculty and administrators
- List of University of Florida presidents

== Bibliography ==
- Farr, James Marion, Intensives and Reflexives in Anglo-Saxon and Early Middle-English, BiblioBazaar, Charleston, South Carolina (2009). ISBN 1-110-99970-4.
- Farr, James M., The Making of a University (unpublished manuscript), University of Florida, George A. Smathers Libraries, Special Collections, Gainesville, Florida (c. 1939–1941).
- McEwen, Tom, The Gators: A Story of Florida Football, The Strode Publishers, Huntsville, Alabama (1974). ISBN 0-87397-025-X.
- Pleasants, Julian M., Gator Tales: An Oral History of the University of Florida, University of Florida, Gainesville, Florida (2006). ISBN 0-8130-3054-4.
- Proctor, Samuel, & Wright Langley, Gator History: A Pictorial History of the University of Florida, South Star Publishing Company, Gainesville, Florida (1986). ISBN 0-938637-00-2.
- Van Ness, Carl, & Kevin McCarthy, Honoring the Past, Shaping the Future: The University of Florida, 1853–2003, University of Florida, Gainesville, Florida (2003).
