= Andrew Sledd =

American university president, professor, theologian

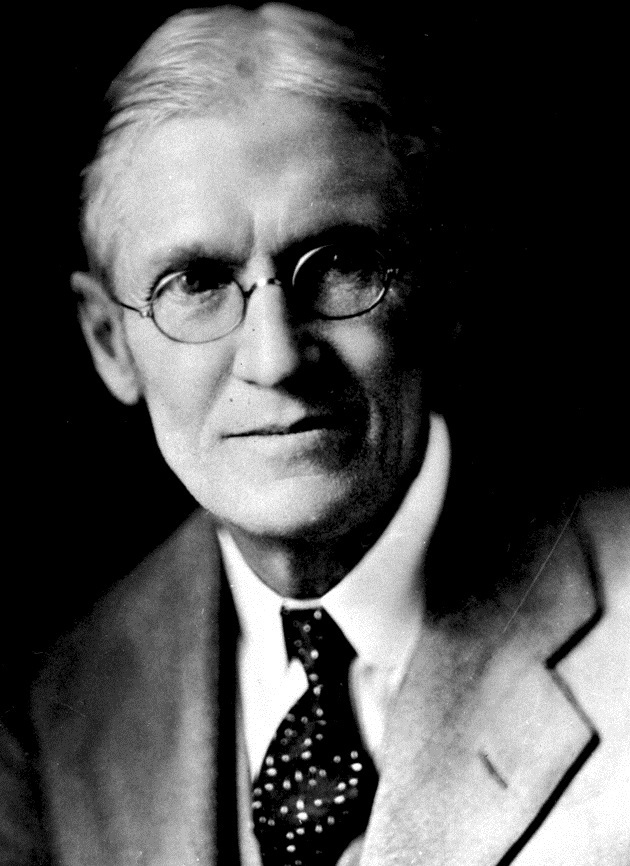
- Sledd, c. 1933

1st President of the University of Florida
- In office June 7, 1905 – April 16, 1909
- Preceded by: Office established
- Succeeded by: Albert A. Murphree

Personal details
- Born: Andrew Warren Sledd; November 7, 1870 Lynchburg, Virginia, U.S.
- Died: March 16, 1939 (aged 68) Decatur, Georgia, U.S.
- Resting place: Decatur Cemetery
- Spouse: Annie Florence "Foncie" Candler
- Education: Randolph–Macon College (BA, MA); Harvard University (MA); Yale University (PhD)
- Known for: New Testament scholarship; Advocacy for educational, social and ecclesiastical reform within the Methodist Episcopal Church

Andrew Warren Sledd (November 7, 1870 – March 16, 1939) was an American theologian, university professor and university president. A native of Virginia, he was the son of a prominent Methodist minister, and was himself ordained as a minister after earning his bachelor's and master's degrees. He later earned a second master's degree and his doctorate.

After teaching for several years, Sledd was chosen to be the last president of the University of Florida at Lake City, from 1904 to 1905, and the first president of the modern University of Florida (first known as the "University of the State of Florida"), from 1905 to 1909. He was also president of Southern University from 1910 to 1914, and later became a professor and an influential biblical scholar at Emory University's Candler School of Theology from 1914 to 1939.

Sledd first received national recognition after he wrote a 1902 magazine article advocating better legal and social treatment of African-Americans, some of whom faced lynching by white mobs. He is also prominently remembered for his role in founding the modern University of Florida, his scholarly analysis of biblical texts as literature, his call for an end to racial violence, and his influence on a generation of Methodist seminary students, scholars and ministers.

== Early life and education ==
Sledd was born November 7, 1870, in Lynchburg, Virginia, the son of a Methodist Episcopal minister, Robert Newton Sledd, and his wife, Frances Carey Greene Sledd. The elder Sledd was an influential minister within the Virginia Methodist Conference, and at various times while Andrew was growing up, his father held prominent pastorates of large Methodist congregations in four different Virginia cities—Danville, Norfolk, Petersburg and Richmond. Andrew received his early education in the Petersburg school of W. Gordon McCabe, a former Confederate captain and veteran of the U.S. Civil War.

In 1888, Sledd entered Methodist-affiliated Randolph–Macon College in Ashland, Virginia. While at Randolph–Macon, he was a member of Phi Delta Theta fraternity (Virginia Gamma chapter); he was also the college's outstanding student-athlete and was particularly known as the baseball team's first baseman and star hitter. Sledd left the college without finishing his undergraduate degree requirements, first accepting a position as a teacher in Durant, Mississippi, and then as the principal of a high school in Arkadelphia, Arkansas. After teaching in Arkansas for two years, he returned to Randolph–Macon and completed his Bachelor of Arts and Master of Arts degrees in 1894. Sledd graduated in mathematics, was recognized for completing the best work in the mathematics and Greek departments during his senior year, and was honored as a member of Phi Beta Kappa.

Sledd taught at the Randolph-Macon Academy in Front Royal, Virginia, from 1894 to 1895, before returning to graduate school. He earned a second Master of Arts degree in Greek from Harvard University in Cambridge, Massachusetts in 1896, and completed one year's additional graduate work toward a doctoral degree. While he was at Harvard, he played for the Harvard Crimson baseball team, and he is remembered as one of Harvard's greatest athletes of the era; he was offered a professional baseball contract but turned it down. Several years later, during a break in his teaching career, Sledd completed his doctorate.

== Scholar and educator ==
=== Emory College and the "Sledd Affair" ===
After completing his graduate studies at Harvard, Sledd briefly served as a Latin instructor at Vanderbilt University in Nashville, Tennessee. He was ordained as a Methodist minister and licensed to preach in 1898. At the suggestion of his father, he contacted Methodist minister Warren Akin Candler, then president of Emory College in Oxford, Georgia, who was a prominent leader of the Georgia Methodist Conference and was a few months from being elevated as a Methodist bishop. Candler was impressed with the character and academic credentials of the young scholar, and assisted him in becoming a professor of Latin language and literature at Emory College, a position Sledd held from 1898 to 1902. While living in the Candler family home, Sledd fell in love with the bishop's only daughter, Annie Florence Candler, and he married her on March 22, 1899; his father conducted the wedding ceremony.

The home of the negro is as sacred as that of the white man; his right to live as truly God-given. If the negro can be kicked and cuffed and cursed rightly, so can the white man. If there is no wrong in dishonoring a negro's home, there is no more wrong in dishonoring the white man's. . . . There is nothing in a white skin or a black to nullify the essential rights of man as man.

— Andrew Sledd, condemning lynching and demanding equal justice for African-Americans in the July 1902 Atlantic Monthly.

Later in 1899, while traveling by train between Atlanta and Covington, Georgia, Sledd witnessed the aftermath of the lynching of an African-American man named Sam Hose. The idealistic young minister was outraged. In reaction, he wrote an essay entitled "The Negro: Another View," which was published as an article in the July 1902 issue of The Atlantic Monthly. In the article, Sledd denounced the lynchings of black men in the South in graphic terms: "lynching is not 'justice,' however rude; it is a wild and diabolic carnival of blood." While he flatly asserted that the "negro race" was not the equal of the "white race," he nevertheless demanded equal justice for blacks and whites alike, writing "There is nothing in a white skin or a black to nullify the essential rights of man as man." Even though Sledd's essay condoned the continued racial segregation of white and black Southerners as a necessary social expedient, a public firestorm ensued in Georgia over Sledd's criticism of the South's treatment of its black citizens, with the controversy stoked by the vitriolic letters and editorial attacks of agrarian populist Rebecca Felton in The Atlanta Constitution newspaper. As the controversy grew, The Atlanta Journal and Atlanta News quickly joined the anti-Sledd chorus. When a majority of the members of Emory's board of trustees threatened to withdraw their support of the college because of the negative publicity, the newly installed college president, James E. Dickey, demanded Sledd's resignation from the faculty, and Sledd resigned on August 9, 1902. The Sledd Affair subsequently attracted attention throughout the United States as a matter of academic freedom and freedom of speech.

After resigning from the Emory College faculty, Sledd entered the graduate school of Yale University in New Haven, Connecticut, where he began work in the advanced classics doctoral program, specializing in Latin. Sledd received $1,000 in severance pay from Emory pursuant to an agreement with Dickey and unanimously approved by the Emory faculty, and his father-in-law contributed $900 to help cover his tuition and living expenses while he attended Yale. He received a scholarship from the university, and earned his Doctor of Philosophy degree in Latin from Yale in 1903, after only nine months. Stanford University and Syracuse University offered him professorships in Latin; Antioch College offered him its presidency. Sledd declined all offers from Northern and Western institutions, and was determined to return to his native South.

=== University of Florida at Lake City ===
After completing his doctorate, Sledd obtained an appointment as a professor of Greek at Methodist-affiliated Southern University (now known as Birmingham–Southern College) in Greensboro, Alabama. Several months later, on July 6, 1904, he was unanimously selected to be the president of the University of Florida at Lake City by its board of trustees. At the time of his appointment, the University of Florida at Lake City was experiencing a controversy of its own: its administration and faculty were hopelessly fractured by personality conflicts and its unpopular president's failed attempts at improving the small school's instruction and academic standing. The university's board of trustees had removed the ineffectual president, and dismissed seven members of its small faculty. The university, such as it was, had been known as "Florida Agricultural College" until 1903. When Sledd arrived in Lake City, it was a school with a new name, a faculty fractured by contentious personalities, an unknown number of returning students and an uncertain future. Sledd required all previous faculty members to re-apply if they desired to keep their jobs, hired replacement instructors, most of whom had earned doctoral degrees in their respective fields (in contrast to the previous faculty), and set about devising rigorous academic standards for the school's new students. Although the university was a designated land-grant college under the federal government's Morrill Act, it received insufficient annual financial assistance from the state government, and its finances remained tenuous.

=== University of the State of Florida ===
Sledd and members of the faculty were actively involved in urging Florida's state government to combine the state's several small institutions of higher education. The university consolidation movement gained the political backing of newly elected Florida Governor Napoleon B. Broward, and in 1905 the Florida Legislature passed the Buckman Act, which abolished the hodge-podge of state-supported colleges and consolidated their assets and programs into a new comprehensive university and land-grant college for white men, and a liberal arts college and normal school for white women. The Act mandated the merger of four separate institutions, including the existing University of Florida at Lake City, into the consolidated men's university—the new University of the State of Florida. By a vote of six to four, the new Board of Control charged with the governance of the consolidated institutions selected Gainesville as the location for the new men's state university.

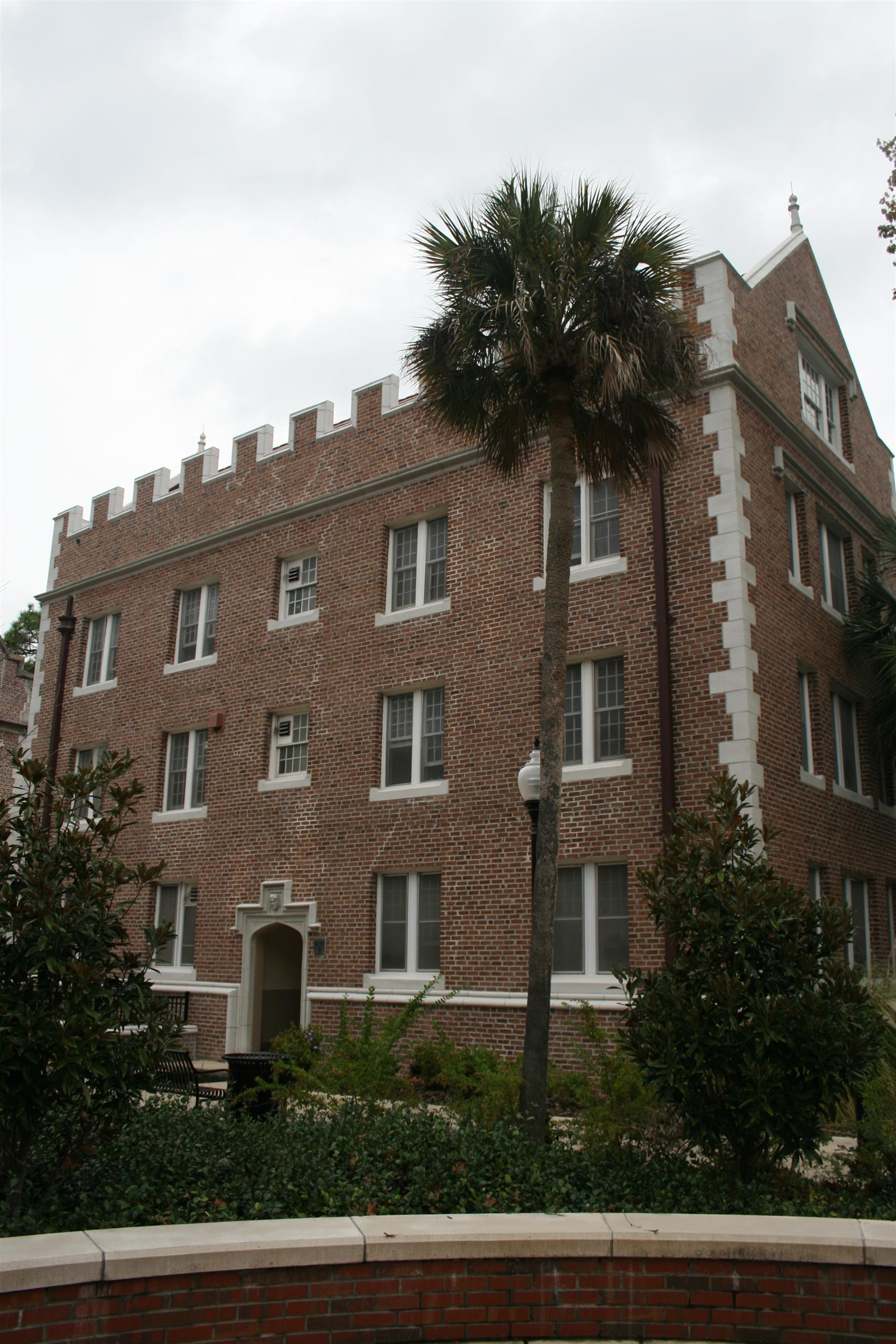
Buckman Hall, one of the first two buildings on the new campus of the University of Florida, where Andrew Sledd and his family lived from 1906 to 1909

Sledd had not anticipated that the Lake City campus would be abandoned, and had assumed that it would be selected as the location of the newly consolidated men's university, placing him in a strong position to become the first president of the new institution. The selection of Gainesville for the campus of the new men's university put Sledd's future as its first president in question. The University of Florida in Lake City was just one of the four existing institutions that were to be merged to form the new university, and there were other possible candidates for the presidency. Albert A. Murphree, president of Florida State College in Tallahassee, was the favorite of several prominent members of the legislature. But Sledd had Governor Broward's backing, and the Board of Control ultimately selected him to be the first president on June 7, 1905; Sledd's appointment was for a single year, but renewable on an annual basis, as was typical in the university's early years when the Board of Control appointed or re-appointed the presidents of the state's public colleges for each academic year. Murphree remained the president of the newly consolidated women's college in Tallahassee until 1909.

Sledd nominated all of the original faculty members, a majority of whom he had previously selected to be professors at the University of Florida at Lake City. The new University of the State of Florida operated in Lake City during the first academic year of its existence (1905–06), while the buildings of the new Gainesville campus were being erected. Sledd managed the move of the school's assets from Lake City to Gainesville during the late summer of 1906, and participated in the official dedication of the campus on September 27, 1906. When registration for classes was held in Gainesville on September 24, 1906, there were 102 students and fewer than a dozen faculty members. Sledd received a $2,250 annual salary in his first year as the head of the new state university and, together with his wife and their young children, moved into the still incomplete Buckman Hall dormitory on the Gainesville campus.

Sledd played a key role in the formation and ultimate success of the new university, but his time as its president was a relatively short four years. His political backing ended with the retirement of Governor Broward, and the inauguration of his successor Albert Gilchrist in January 1909. The Florida Board of Education, which then consisted of the governor and the state's elected cabinet members, oversaw the Board of Control and made no secret of its desire to remove Sledd, in part because members of the Board of Education believed that Sledd's admissions standards were too high and that the university was not growing quickly enough. Nevertheless, the Board of Control continued to back Sledd, and its members threatened to resign in protest. Seeking to avoid an unwinnable political controversy, Sledd resigned, and the Board of Control replaced him with Albert Murphree, the political favorite of several legislative leaders and the Board of Education.

=== Methodist ministry and Southern University ===
Following Sledd's resignation, he and his family returned to Atlanta and stayed in the home of his wife's parents. Within a few weeks, he was appointed minister of the First Methodist Church in Jacksonville, Florida, a position he held for the remainder of 1909 and the first half of 1910. Sledd was subsequently invited to return to Southern University as its president, serving from 1910 to 1914. While president of Southern University, he implemented a new pre-college preparatory school and a four-year course of Bible study, and focused his personal efforts on restoring the school's finances and improving the quality of its instruction.

=== Candler School of Theology ===
In the fall of 1914, Sledd resigned the presidency of Southern University and returned to Emory College, by then renamed Emory University and relocated to its new main campus in northeast Atlanta, as the first Professor of Greek and New Testament Literature at the Candler School of Theology, the newly established seminary of the Methodist Episcopal Church, South. Sledd became well known as a professor of Greek, Latin and New Testament studies at Candler, and was the author of several scholarly books on New Testament subjects, including Saint Mark's Life of Jesus (1927), The Bibles of the Churches (1930) and His Witnesses: A Study of the Book of Acts (1935). He was selected to be a member of the American Standard Bible Committee, which was preparing a revision of the American Standard Version of the Bible. He continued to advocate internal Methodist reform and an end to racial violence, and his teaching inspired a generation of his Candler theology students to act as change agents within the Methodist Episcopal Church, South. Many of his former students became Methodist ministers who returned to their congregations and annual conferences to work for better treatment of African-Americans, helping the Southern Methodist church to evolve from a mainstay of theological and racial intransigence to an agent for social change and doctrinal reform.

Sledd's interest in education was not limited to the higher education of colleges and universities. While holding his Candler professorship, he served as a member of the Board of Public Instruction of DeKalb County, Georgia, and volunteered to serve as the board's treasurer.

Sledd and his wife Annie also suffered a personal tragedy during his time as a Candler professor, when their first-born son and his namesake, Andrew Sledd Jr., died after an extended illness in 1919. Andrew Jr. was 16 years old, and had graduated from Decatur High School only weeks earlier.

== Death and legacy ==
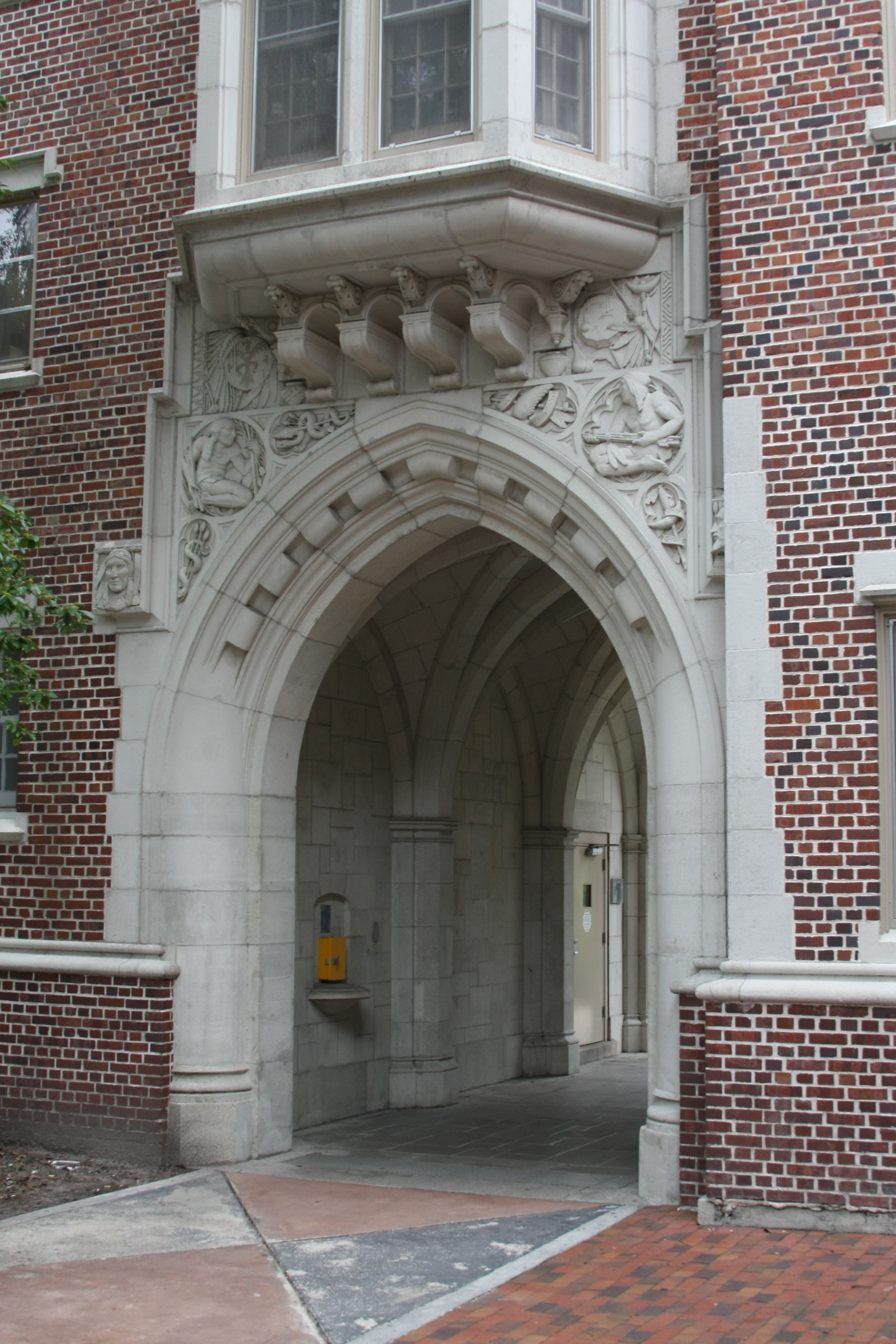
Passageway through Sledd Hall, a student residence hall of the University of Florida which was known as New Dormitory from its completion in 1929, but was renamed after Andrew Sledd's death in 1939

Sledd became a recognized New Testament scholar and a significant voice of educational, social and ecclesiastical reform within the Methodist Episcopal Church, South. For nearly twenty-five years, he remained a professor at Emory University's Candler School of Theology, until his death from a heart attack on March 16, 1939. Following Sledd's funeral, his body was buried in the Decatur Cemetery.

In his 1960 History of Methodism in Alabama and West Florida, Marion Elias Lazenby remembered Sledd as "one of the [Methodist] Church's most scholarly and reverent teachers." Immediately after his death, Sledd was widely eulogized in Methodist churches across the country, and numerous obituaries appeared in regional and national newspapers across the country. The Atlanta Constitution, whose editorials had vilified Sledd in 1902, paid tribute to him in its obituary as a "nationally known Bible authority"; no mention was made of the "Sledd Affair."

Sledd's advocacy of social change and an evolving understanding of biblical texts came at a high personal price. Given his chosen career of minister and professor, he never accumulated much personal wealth. Sledd died deep in debt, having lost the family home to foreclosure after the salaries of Candler professors were cut when financial support of the school fell during the Great Depression in the 1930s. His creditors obtained a deficiency judgment for the unpaid portion of his debt after the foreclosure and, following his death, forced the sale of some of his furniture and parts of his personal library in partial satisfaction of his remaining debts.

The faculty of the University of Florida awarded Sledd the university's first honorary degree, a Doctor of Divinity, at the spring 1909 commencement ceremonies. In 1933, John J. Tigert, the university's third president, invited Professor Sledd to be the university's baccalaureate speaker. After his death, the university honored him again, renaming one of its early residence halls as Sledd Hall in 1939. The small state university, which Sledd had been instrumental in creating and organizing, is now one of the ten largest single-campus universities in the United States, with a total enrollment of nearly 50,000 undergraduate, graduate and professional students.

Sledd and his wife Annie had nine children. Eight of their children graduated from Emory, seven with Phi Beta Kappa honors, a fact newsworthy enough to be picked up by the Associated Press wire service when youngest daughter Antoinette graduated from Emory the year following Sledd's death. Two of their sons followed in their father's footsteps, earning doctorates and becoming university professors: James H. Sledd became a Rhodes Scholar and noted professor of English literature at the University of Chicago and the University of Texas; Marvin B. Sledd was a professor of mathematics at Georgia Tech.

In 2002, after almost a century of ignoring its role in the "Sledd Affair," Emory University sponsored a presentation entitled "Professing Justice: A Symposium on the Civil Rights Legacy of Professor Andrew Sledd." In holding the inter-disciplinary symposium, Emory University acted to "right a wrong committed a century ago by revisiting the 'Sledd affair' and reflecting on its meaning for Emory today."

== See also ==
- History of the University of Florida
- List of University of Florida presidents
- List of University of Florida honorary degree recipients
- List of Emory University people
- List of Phi Beta Kappa members
- List of Phi Delta Theta members

== Bibliography ==
- Barnett, Albert E., Andrew Sledd: His Life and Work, Candler School of Theology, Emory University, Atlanta, Georgia (1956). OCLC 11277862
- Bauman, Mark K., Warren Akin Candler: The Conservative as Idealist, The Scarecrow Press, Inc., Metuchen, New Jersey, p. 30 (1981). ISBN 978-0-8108-1368-7.
- Farr, James M., The Making of a University (unpublished manuscript), University of Florida, George A. Smathers Libraries, Special Collections, Gainesville, Florida (c. 1935–1941).
- Firth, Raymond H., The Life of Andrew Sledd (unpublished thesis), Candler School of Theology, Emory University, Atlanta, Georgia (1940). OCLC 38021764
- Lazenby, Marion Elias, History of Methodism in Alabama and West Florida, North Alabama Conference and Alabama–West Florida Conference of the Methodist Church, (1960). OCLC 1632564
- Matthews, Terry, L., "The Voice of a Prophet: Andrew Sledd Revisited," Journal of Southern Religion, vol. 6, p. 4 (December 2003).
- Pleasants, Julian M., Gator Tales: An Oral History of the University of Florida, University of Florida, Gainesville, Florida (2006). ISBN 0-8130-3054-4
- Proctor, Samuel, & Wright Langley, Gator History: A Pictorial History of the University of Florida, South Star Publishing Company, Gainesville, Florida (1986). ISBN 0-938637-00-2.
- Reed, Ralph E., Jr., "Emory College and the Sledd Affair of 1902: A Case Study in Southern Honor and Racial Attitudes," The Georgia Historical Quarterly, vol. 72, no. 3, pp. 463–492 (Fall 1988). OCLC 23011699 JSTOR 40581859
- Sledd, Andrew, Autobiography of a Southern Schoolmaster (unpublished manuscript), University of Florida, George A. Smathers Libraries, Special Collections, Gainesville, Florida, (c. 1905–1906). A Guide to the Andrew Sledd Papers
- Sledd, Andrew, "The Negro: Another View," The Atlantic Monthly, vol. 90, pp. 65–73 (July 1902).
- Van Ness, Carl, "Florida's Sledd Affair: Andrew Sledd and the Fight for Higher Education in Florida," Florida Historical Quarterly, vol. 87, no. 3, p. 321 (2009). OCLC 5543805681 JSTOR 20700231
- Van Ness, Carl, and Kevin McCarthy, Honoring the Past, Shaping the Future: The University of Florida, 1853–2003, University of Florida, Gainesville, Florida (2003). OCLC 61178627
- Warnock, Henry Y., "Andrew Sledd, Southern Methodists, and the Negro: A Case History," The Journal of Southern History, vol. 31, no. 3, pp. 251–271 (1965). ISSN 0022-4642. OCLC 49014966 JSTOR 2204439
- Warnock, Henry Y., "Sledd, Andrew Warren," Dictionary of Georgia Biography, Vol. 2, University of Georgia Press, Athens, Georgia, pp. 893–894 (1983). ISBN 978-0-8203-0662-9.
