= Murfree =

Murfree is a surname. Notable people with the surname include:

- Hardy Murfree (1752–1809), military officer from North Carolina during the American Revolutionary War
- Mary Noailles Murfree (1850–1922), American fiction writer who wrote under the pen name Charles Egbert Craddock
- William H. Murfree (1781–1827), member of the United States House of Representatives from North Carolina

== See also ==
- Discovery Center at Murfree Spring, nature center and wetlands boardwalk near downtown Murfreesboro, Tennessee
