= Albert A. Murphree =

American university president, professor

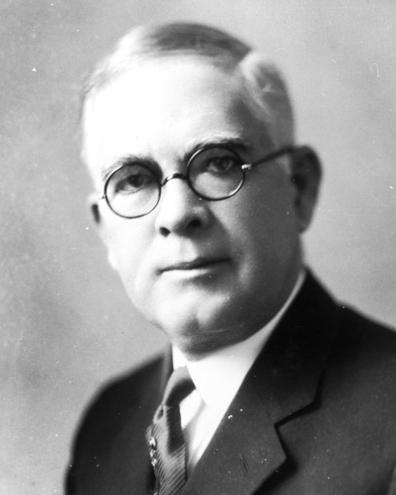
- Murphree, c. 1927

2nd President of the University of Florida
- In office April 16, 1909 – December 20, 1927
- Preceded by: Andrew Sledd
- Succeeded by: James M. Farr (interim)

Personal details
- Born: Albert Alexander Murphree; April 29, 1870 Chepultepec, Alabama, U.S.
- Died: December 20, 1927 (aged 57) Gainesville, Florida, U.S.
- Spouse: Jennie Henderson Murphree
- Education: University of Nashville (BA); Florida State University (MA)
- Occupation: Mathematics Professor; University President

Albert Alexander Murphree (April 29, 1870 – December 20, 1927) was an American college professor and university president. Murphree was a native of Alabama, and became a mathematics instructor after earning his bachelor's degree. He later served as the third president of Florida State College (later renamed Florida State University) from 1897 to 1909, and the second president of the University of Florida from 1909 to 1927. Murphree is the only person to have been the president of both of Florida's original state universities, the University of Florida and Florida State University, and he played an important role in the organization, growth and ultimate success of both institutions.

== Early life and education ==
Murphree was born near Chepultepec, Alabama in 1870. His father was Jesee Ellis Murphree, a Confederate veteran of the Civil War; his mother was Emily Helen Cornelius. His parents raised him in a family of ten children in Walnut Grove, Alabama, where he attended community schools and a local two-year college. He graduated from the University of Nashville with a Bachelor of Arts degree in 1894, and taught mathematics at several high schools and small colleges in Alabama, Tennessee and Texas. In 1895, he became a mathematics instructor at the West Florida Seminary (now known as Florida State University) in Tallahassee, Florida, and two years later, its board of trustees appointed him as the seminary's third president in 1897, at the age of 27. Later, Murphree married Jennie Henderson, the daughter of John A. Henderson, one of the seminary's trustees. He subsequently started and completed the academic work for a Master of Arts degree while serving as president of the seminary, renamed Florida State College in 1901.

== Professor and university president ==
As President of West Florida Seminary, Murphree worked to create Florida's first liberal arts college by 1897, and in 1901 it was reorganized into the Florida State College with four departments: the college, the College Academy, the School for Teachers and the School of Music. Under his leadership, the Florida State College produced the state's first Rhodes Scholar in 1905, Frederic "Fritz" Buchholz (1885–65).

In 1905, several prominent political backers advanced Murphree's name to be the first president of the new University of the State of Florida located in Gainesville, Florida, which was the newly consolidated men's university and land-grant college created by the Florida Legislature's passage of the Buckman Act, which segregated Florida's schools of higher learning by race and gender. Instead, the Florida Board of Control selected Andrew Sledd, then the president of the University of Florida in Lake City, to be the first president of the new men's university. Murphree continued to serve as the president of Florida State College, which became the all-female Florida Female College under the Buckman Act. From 1905 to 1909, Murphree emphasized greater academic expectations for his female students, while upgrading and expanding the college's curriculum to meet modern university standards. In 1909, Murphree convinced the legislature to change the name of the college to the Florida State College for Women.

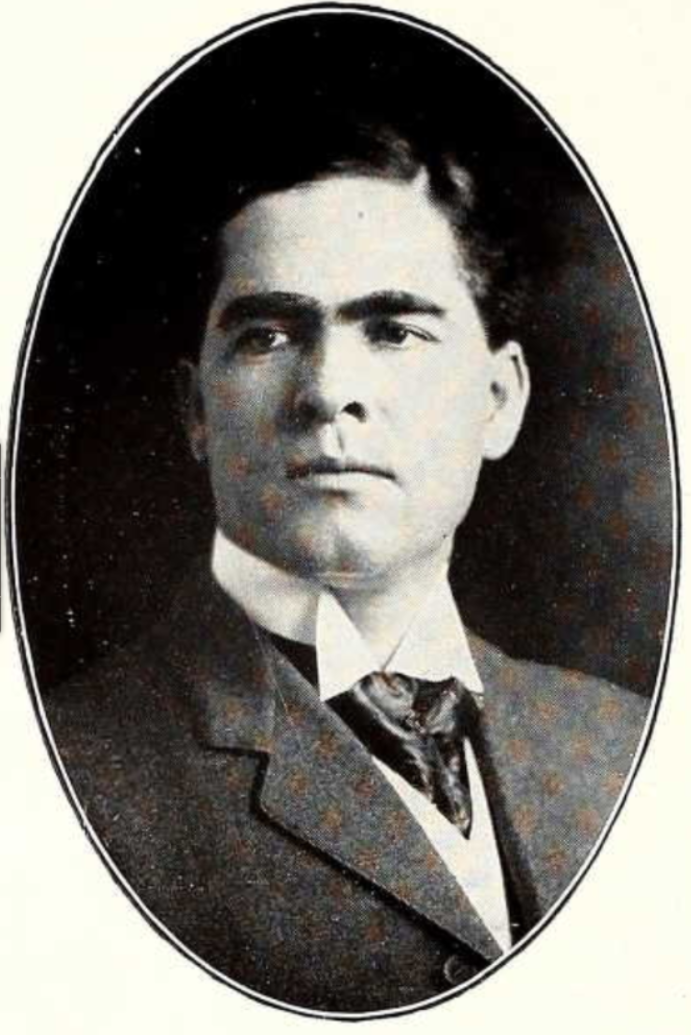
Murphree from 1911 Seminole yearbook

When the first president of the University of Florida, Andrew Sledd, was not re-appointed for the 1909–10 school year because of a conflict over what the new governor and members of the Florida Board of Education believed were Sledd's inflexible admissions standards that were impeding the growth of the university, Murphree's name was once again advanced as a replacement. This time, the Board of Control voted unanimously to approve his appointment. Murphree assumed his new duties during the summer of 1909, and worked diligently with his predecessor to ensure a smooth transition that capitalized on previous successes. In a surprise to some of his previous political supporters, Murphree endorsed Sledd's admissions standards, and thereafter actually tightened the requirements for entry again in 1912.

His supreme quality . . . was his personal charm and magnetism. No one ever left his office, no matter how disappointed, with any personal resentment.

— Prof. James M. Farr, commenting on Albert Murphree
in The Making of a University.

Beginning in 1910, Murphree reorganized the university's administration into four academic colleges: the College of Arts and Sciences, the College of Law, the College of Agriculture, and the College of Engineering, as well as the Graduate School. Murphree took particular interest in the "School of Graduate Studies," and the university awarded its first master's degree in 1910. He later oversaw the addition of the College of Education in 1912, the School of Pharmacy in 1924, the School of Architecture in 1925, and the College of Commerce and Journalism in 1927. During Murphree's term, he oversaw the construction of ten new major buildings, including such historical landmarks as Flint Hall (Science Department), Floyd Hall (College of Agriculture), Peabody Hall (College of Education), the University Auditorium, and the new University Library (now known as Smathers Library East). The University of Florida's enrollment grew from 186 students in 1909 to over 2,000 in 1927.

Murphree is reported to have taken pride in knowing every Florida student by name. Under Murphree, student leaders formed the Florida Blue Key leadership society in 1923, the university celebrated its first homecoming parade in 1924, and students organized the first Gator Growl pep rally and variety show in 1925.

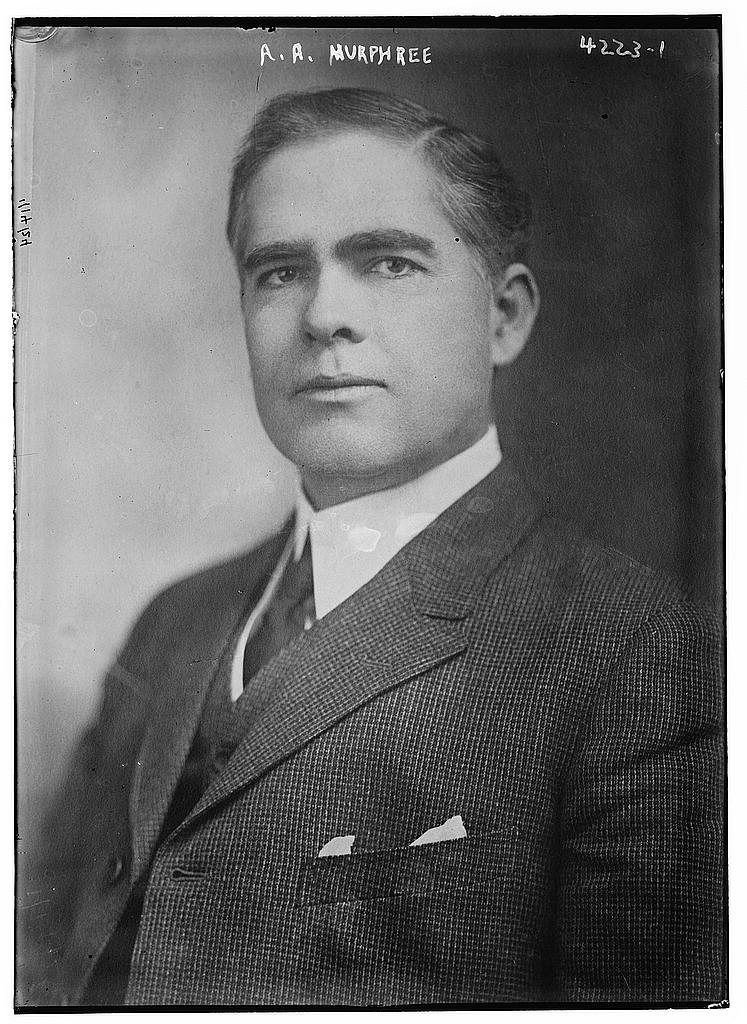
Murphree in 1917

While president of Florida, Murphree became a friend of William Jennings Bryan, the former U.S. Representative from Nebraska and the Democratic Party nominee for president in 1896, 1900 and 1908. Bryan established a winter residence in Miami, Florida in 1912, and became a full-time Florida resident in 1921. Bryan was a frequent speaker throughout Florida, and first met Murphree at a speech at the university in 1916. As a result of his friendship with Murphree, Bryan volunteered to be the fund-raising drive chairman for the construction of the university's new Florida Union building (now known as Dauer Hall).

Murphree's name was floated as a possible gubernatorial candidate on several occasions, but he publicly disavowed any personal interest in elected office. Without consulting Murphree in advance, on January 13, 1924, William Jennings Bryan announced his candidacy to be a delegate to the 1924 Democratic National Convention, where, if elected, he would nominate Murphree as the party's candidate for President of the United States in the 1924 election. Bryan campaigned vigorously despite Murphree's steadfast refusal to do so as a candidate. Murphree stated that he was flattered by Bryan's effort, but "Nobody expects a Southern man to be nominated President, much less a Florida man." Florida newspapers urged Murphree to run, but few others took his candidacy seriously. Bryan was elected as a delegate to the Democratic Convention, pledged to support Murphree's nomination, but Bryan was greeted by boos and jeers at the convention because of his nomination of Murphree. Bryan later told Senator J. Thomas Heflin that his reception by his fellow convention delegates was the most humiliating of his life.

Murphree was elected president of the National Association of State Universities in 1927.

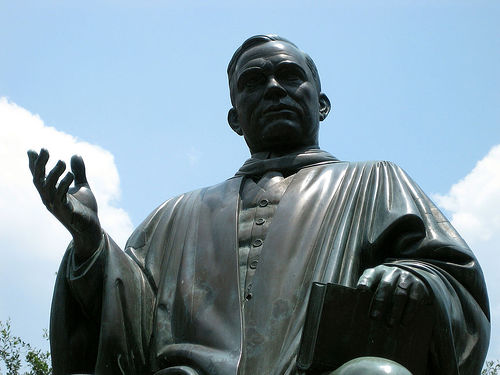
Statue of Murphree, at the University of Florida. He is the only president honored with a statue on the university's campus.

== Death and legacy ==
Murphree died unexpectedly in his sleep, at the age of 57, in Gainesville on December 20, 1927. His wife Jennie had died six years earlier in 1921. They are both buried in St. John's Episcopal Church cemetery in downtown Tallahassee, only a few blocks from Florida State University. Murphree and his wife were survived by four children––two sons, John A.H. Murphree and Albert A. Murphree Jr., and two daughters, Alberta Murphree Worth and Martha Murphree Wallace. Murphree's daughter Martha graduated from Florida State College for Women with a bachelor's degree in 1925. His son and namesake, Albert A. "Waddy" Murphree Jr., graduated from the University of Florida with a bachelor's degree in 1929, earned a master's degree from Oxford University as a Rhodes Scholar from 1929 to 1933, and would later serve as a professor of English literature at the university from 1941 to 1974.

Murphree, who was the second choice to be the first president of the University of Florida, served longer as the second leader of the university than all but one of its other ten presidents. While he was not the founding president, Murphree built upon the solid academic standards, faculty selections and planning of his predecessor, Andrew Sledd, and greatly expanded and improved upon them; he imposed the university's modern organizational structure and was responsible for the beginnings of many of its traditions.

After his death, Murphree was widely praised on the editorial pages of newspapers throughout the state and region. He was credited with helping the University of Florida grow from a small state college into a rapidly expanding regional university in his eighteen years as its president.

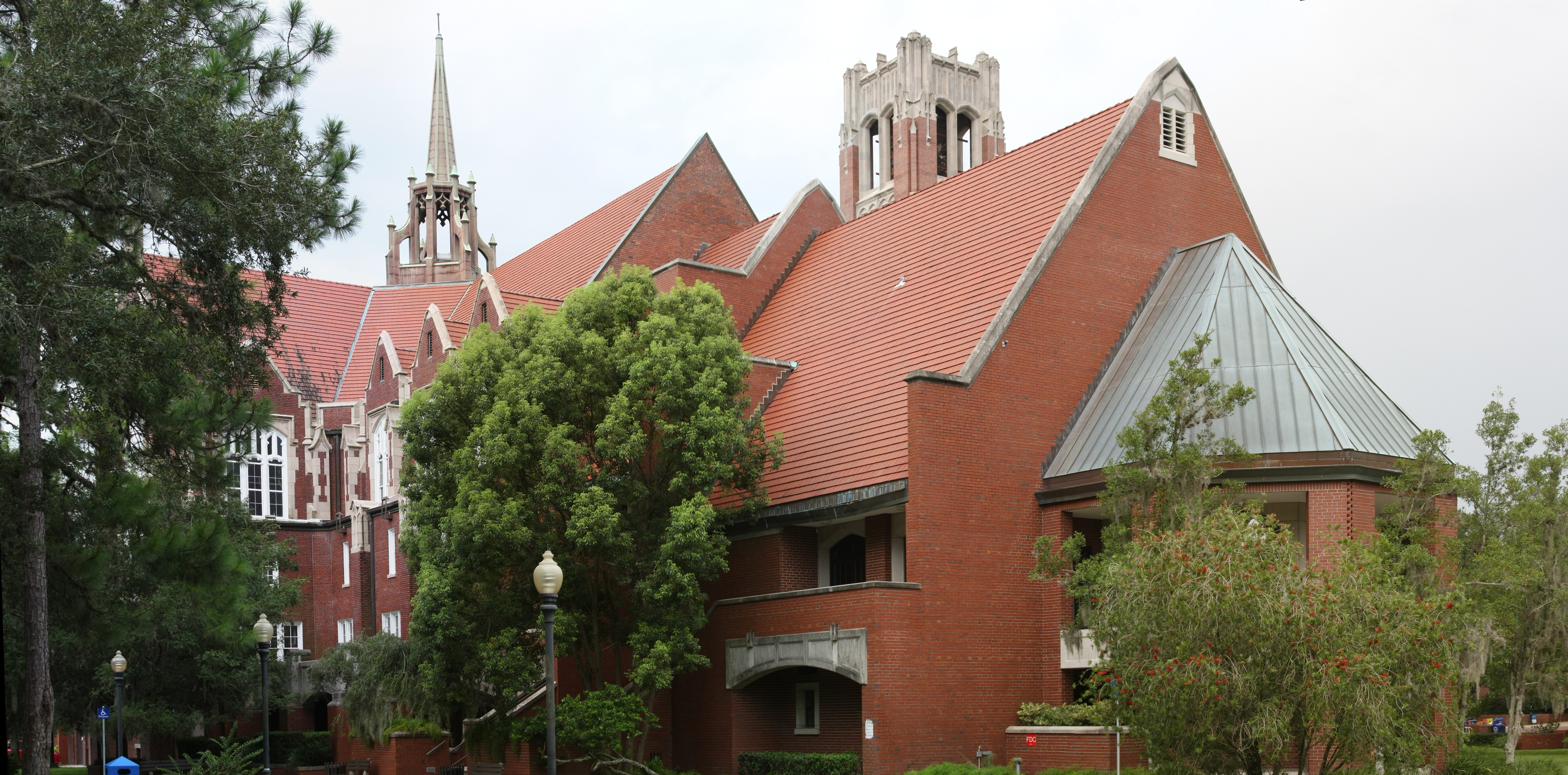
The University Auditorium was the largest construction project completed on the University of Florida's Gainesville campus during Murphree's presidency.

The two universities that Murphree nurtured in their infancy continued to grow and prosper after his death. In 2010, Florida State University had a total enrollment of over 41,000 undergraduate, graduate and professional students; the University of Florida enrolled over 50,000 total students. In a little over one hundred years, the two national research universities, in whose early expansion and improvement Murphree had played a fundamental role, had grown to take their places among the largest single-campus universities in the United States, the University of Florida among the ten largest.

In honor of its second president, the University of Florida erected a statue of Murphree on its Gainesville campus, adjacent to such landmarks as the Plaza of the Americas, Library East and Peabody Hall; Murphree is the only Florida president so honored. Florida also named one of its early dormitories, Murphree Hall, in tribute. In remembrance of its third president, Florida State University erected a campus statue adjacent to Jennie Murphree Hall, named for Murphree's wife.

== See also ==
- History of Florida
- History of Florida State University
- History of the University of Florida
- List of Florida State University alumni
- List of University of Florida presidents
- State University System of Florida

== Bibliography ==
- Armstrong, Orland Kay, The Life and Work of Dr. A.A. Murphree, The Record Company, St. Augustine, Florida (1928).
- Farr, James M., The Making of a University (unpublished manuscript), University of Florida, George A. Smathers Libraries, Special Collections, Gainesville, Florida (c. 1939–1941).
- Pleasants, Julian M., Gator Tales: An Oral History of the University of Florida, University of Florida, Gainesville, Florida (2006). ISBN 0-8130-3054-4.
- Proctor, Samuel, & Wright Langley, Gator History: A Pictorial History of the University of Florida, South Star Publishing Company, Gainesville, Florida (1986). ISBN 0-938637-00-2.
- Van Ness, Carl, & Kevin McCarthy, Honoring the Past, Shaping the Future: The University of Florida, 1853–2003, University of Florida, Gainesville, Florida (2003).
