= Thomas Hall (Gainesville, Florida) =

- U.S. National Register of Historic Places
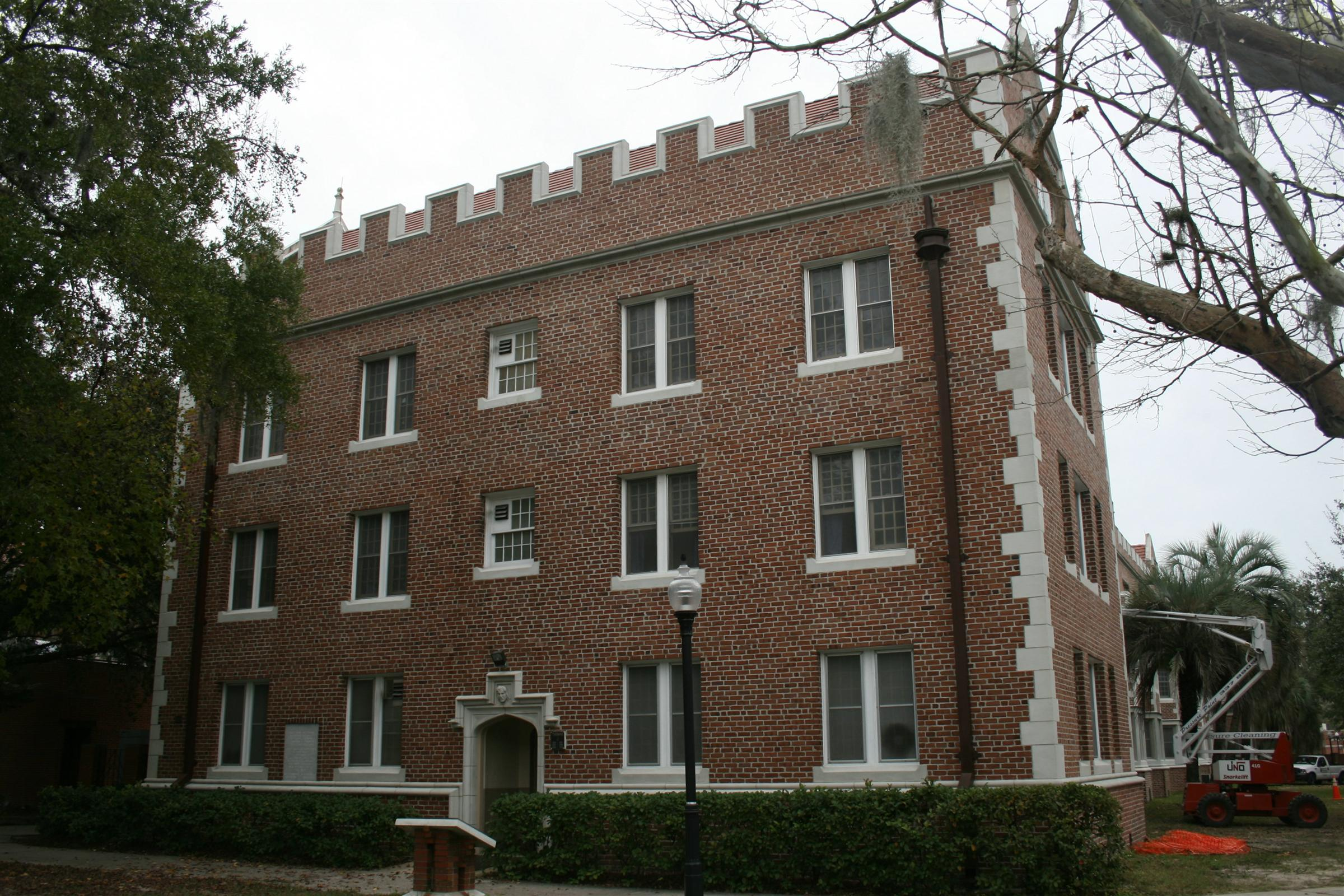
- Thomas Hall, University of Florida

- Location within Florida Location within the United States
- Location: Gainesville, Florida
- Coordinates: 29°39′3″N 82°20′46″W
- Built: 1905
- Architect: William Augustus Edwards of Edwards & Walters
- NRHP reference No.: 74000610
- Added to NRHP: October 1, 1974

Thomas Hall, built in 1905, is a historic building located in Murphree Area on the campus of the University of Florida in Gainesville, Florida, United States. The building is named for William Reuben Thomas, the Gainesville mayor and businessman responsible for bringing the University of Florida to Gainesville.

Architect William Augustus Edwards designed Thomas Hall in the Collegiate Gothic style. Buckman Hall was built at the same time and the two are the oldest buildings on the campus. On October 1, 1974, Thomas Hall was added to the U.S. National Register of Historic Places. Thomas Hall has been used as a dormitory for many years.

== See also ==
- University of Florida
- Buildings at the University of Florida
- University of Florida student housing
- Campus Historic District
