= William Reuben Thomas =

American politician

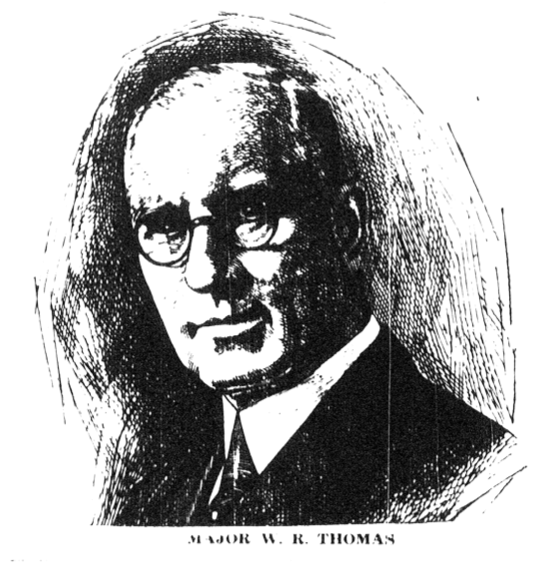

Personal details
- Born: May 24, 1866 Gainesville, Florida
- Died: September 10, 1943 Gainesville, Florida

William Reuben Thomas (May 24, 1866 - September 10, 1943) was a politician and businessman from Gainesville, Florida.

== Background ==
Thomas was a native of Gainesville, Florida. After graduating college he became a teacher at the East Florida Seminary. There he gained the title Major which he retained throughout his life.

== Political leadership ==
Major Thomas represented Alachua County for four years in the Florida Senate. He served as Senate President in 1895 and Senate President Pro Tempore in 1897. Following his state legislative service, Thomas served six terms as Gainesville's mayor from 1901 through 1907. As Mayor, he ushered in the city's first paved streets, sidewalks, sewers, and electric lights. Out of office, Thomas also provided political leadership. When, in 1923, Gainesville's then mayor and police chief condoned criminal activity by the Ku Klux Klan, Thomas wrote an editorial calling for both men to resign. Compared to other cities, Gainesville was relatively immune to Klan incited violence. Contemporary commentators have attributed this to Major Thomas’ willingness to publicly stand against those who supported the Klan.

== Business ==
Thomas was an active businessman owning banks and hardware, livery and stable, and grocery businesses. Thomas also owned two hotels. The White House Hotel was a hostelry, or home for travelers, that Thomas opened in 1909. The Hotel Thomas provided more luxurious accommodations to tourists. Thomas sold $160,000 worth of bonds to raise money to convert his private residence in northeast Gainesville into the Hotel Thomas in 1926. The renovation included consolidation of six city blocks. Today the City of Gainesville owns the building which is now named the William Reuben Thomas Center, and which houses city offices, event space, and cultural and historical exhibits.

== University of Florida ==
Major Thomas’ most lasting accomplishment was securing Gainesville as the home of the University of Florida. During the summer of 1905, Florida Governor Napoleon B. Broward established a board to consolidate the state's education system under a single regulatory body and to establish a single university for white males. Mayor Thomas led the campaign to locate this university in Gainesville. Thomas personally donated 517 acres (2.09 km^{2}) of land to entice the state to choose Gainesville. He succeeded and Thomas Hall, one of the first two buildings constructed at the University of Florida, is named in Major Thomas’ honor.
