= Henry Holland Buckman =

American politician (1858–1914)

The Florida Legislators who passed the Buckman Act in 1905. Buckman is standing on the right front row wearing a white suit

Henry Holland Buckman (1858–1914) was an attorney from Duval County, Florida. He served as a Democratic member of the Florida House of Representatives. He served on the Judiciary Committee. He also served as a member for the 18th district of the Florida Senate.

Buckman is known for being the author of the Buckman Act, a 1905 law that reorganized higher education into three institutions, segregated by race and gender, as follows:

- the Florida Female College (the present Florida State University) for Caucasian women;
- the State Normal and Industrial College for Colored Students (the present Florida Agricultural and Mechanical University) for African American men and women; and
- the University of the State of Florida (the present University of Florida) for Caucasian men.

The Buckman Act also created the Florida Board of Control, the state-wide governing body for Florida's universities and colleges, and the predecessor of today's Florida Board of Governors. The gender separation aspect of the Buckman Act was later reversed by the Florida Legislature in 1947, when Florida State University and the University of Florida began to enroll both men and women. The legislature was compelled to expand the available capacity of both institutions to make room for the World War II veterans who wished to use the G.I. Bill to pursue university educations. The racial segregation aspect of the Buckman Act was undone by the McLaurin v. Oklahoma State Regents and Brown v. Board of Education decisions of the U.S. Supreme Court.

Buckman was also instrumental in establishing a state road system in Florida and developing the St. Johns River channel.

== Honors ==
Buckman Hall at the University of Florida, and the Buckman Bridge in Jacksonville, Florida are both named for Representative Buckman. The Henry H. Buckman Lock is part of the Cross Florida Barge Canal project, also named in honor of Buckman.
