= List of presidents of the University of Florida =

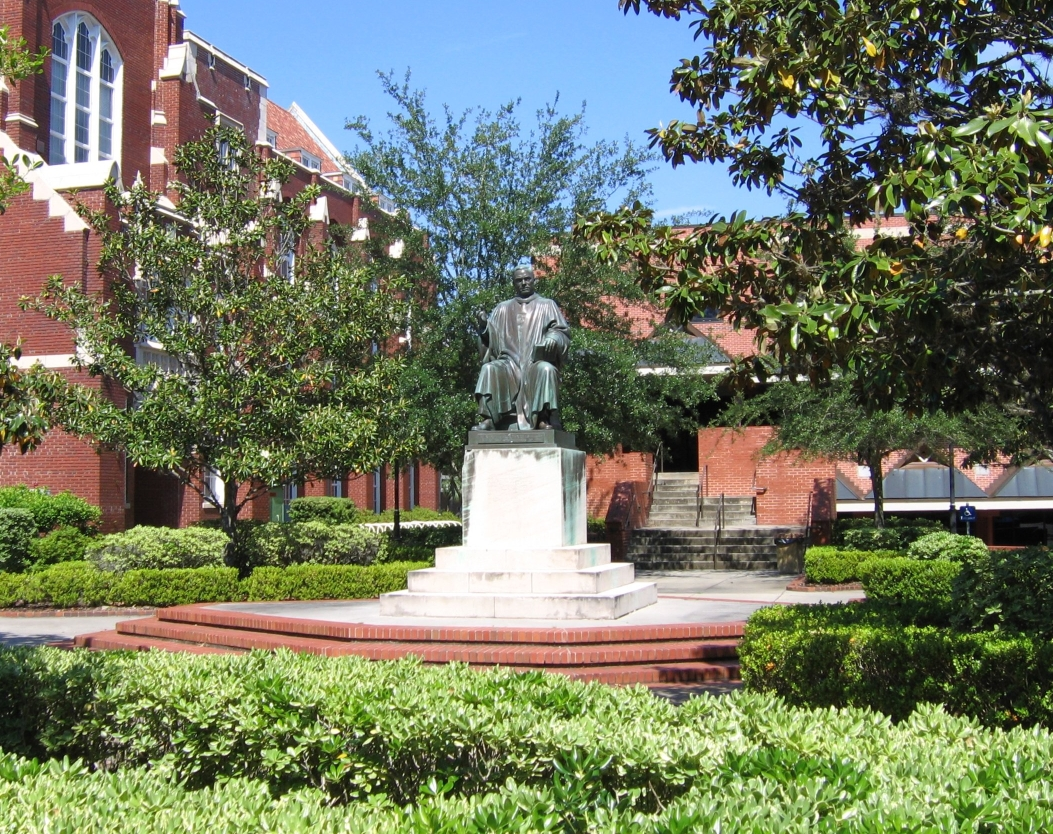
Statue of Albert A. Murphree, second president of the University of Florida, located in the courtyard adjacent to Criser Hall, Peabody Hall and Smathers Library East

Nineteen men have served as the president of the University of Florida since the modern university was created from the consolidation of four predecessor institutions by the Florida state legislature in 1905. Of these, fourteen have served as the university's permanent president, while the other five have served as interim president pending the appointment of a permanent successor.

The University of Florida is a public university, created and supported by the State of Florida. The primary campus of the university is located in Gainesville, and it has academic, agricultural, medical and other research facilities in Jacksonville, Orlando, and throughout Florida. The university traces its origins to 1853, the founding date of the East Florida Seminary in Ocala, Florida, the oldest of the university's four predecessor institutions. Following the 1905 merger of its predecessor institutions, the newly consolidated men's university and land-grant college was first known as the "University of the State of Florida." The name was officially shortened to the "University of Florida" in 1909.

The University of Florida is one of seventy-one member institutions of the Association of American Universities (AAU), the association of preeminent North American research universities, and one of only two AAU member universities in Florida. Following the creation of performance standards by the Florida state legislature in 2013, the Florida Board of Governors designated the University of Florida as one of two "preeminent universities" among the twelve universities of the State University System of Florida.

To date, the youngest president of the University of Florida has been Andrew Sledd, who facilitated the organization of the new university from the consolidation of its predecessor institutions in 1905. When the Florida Board of Control appointed Sledd as the first president of the new state university on June 7, 1905, he was five months short of his thirty-fifth birthday. The longest-serving president of the university was John J. Tigert, who held the office for nineteen years from 1928 to 1947. The first university faculty member to become its permanent president was J. Wayne Reitz in 1955, and the first university alumnus to become its president was Stephen C. O'Connell in 1967.

On May 4, 2025, Santa Ono became the solo finalist for the fourteenth presidency of the University of Florida. Ono served as the fifteenth president of the University of Michigan from October 2022 to May 2025, succeeded by Domenico Grasso. Ono was selected as president by the University of Florida Board of Trustees on May 27, 2025, and was rejected by the Florida Board of Governors on June 3, 2025. The fourteenth presidency search process was started over.

== List of presidents ==
| # | Portrait | Name | Term | Biography and accomplishments |
|---|---|---|---|---|
| 1 | | Andrew W. Sledd | 1905–1909 | Sledd was the founding president of the "University of the State of Florida," the newly consolidated men's land-grant college and state university in Gainesville. He nominated the initial faculty in 1905, established admissions standards and curriculum, and oversaw the transfer of assets from the university's temporary Lake City campus to the new permanent Gainesville campus in 1906. An ordained Methodist minister, Sledd later served as the president of Methodist-affiliated Southern University and became a prominent New Testament scholar at the Candler School of Theology at Emory University. |
| 2 | | Albert A. Murphree | 1909–1927 | Murphree organized many of the University of Florida's first constituent colleges and schools, oversaw financing and construction of numerous new campus buildings, increased student enrollment from 186 to over 2,000, and was responsible for the beginnings of many of the modern university's traditions. Murphree oversaw the university's growth from a small state college to a major regional university, and he was widely recognized as laying the foundation for the university's later expansion and success. Murphree was a mathematics professor and the third president of Florida State University before becoming president of the University of Florida. |
| Interim | | James M. Farr | 1927–1928 | Farr became the acting president of the University of Florida following the unexpected death of Albert Murphree. He was an English language and literature scholar, and served as the first vice president of the university from its legislative consolidation in 1905, and chairman of the English Department, until his retirement in 1934. As a professor, he was responsible for the beginnings of the university's honor system. In retirement, Farr wrote a narrative history of the university and its predecessor institution, Florida Agricultural College, called The Making of a University. |
| 3 | | John J. Tigert, IV | 1928–1947 | Tigert was an All-Southern halfback, a Rhodes Scholar, a college basketball and football head coach, the president of Kentucky Wesleyan College and the U.S. commissioner of education. As the longest-serving president of the University of Florida, he prompted the creation of University College and the imposition of new general education requirements, led the effort to finance and build Florida Field, was instrumental in the formation of the Southeastern Conference in 1932, advocated the creation of the athletic grant-in-aid, and oversaw the growth of the student body from approximately 2,200 to over 7,500. Tigert was inducted into the College Football Hall of Fame in 1970. |
| Interim | | H. Harold Hume | 1947 | Hume became the acting president of the University of Florida following the resignation of John J. Tigert in 1947. Hume was a prominent horticulturalist, Dean of the College of Agriculture, the university's Provost for Agriculture, and author of numerous horticultural books and academic journal articles. He was inducted into the Florida Citrus Hall of Fame in 1965. |
| 4 | | J. Hillis Miller | 1947–1953 | Miller implemented the University of Florida's post-World War II enrollment increases, the integration of women into the student body, and major expansion of campus facilities. Most notably, Miller was responsible for obtaining approval and funding of the university's Health Science Center and College of Medicine, the state of Florida's first public medical school and teaching hospital. |
| Interim | | John S. Allen | 1953–1955 | Allen became the acting president of the University of Florida following the unexpected death of J. Hillis Miller. During his nearly fifteen months as interim president, Allen continued Miller's campus building projects and worked to improve veteran education. He was a professor of astronomy and executive vice president of the university, and later served as the founding president of the University of South Florida from 1957 to 1970. |
| 5 | | J. Wayne Reitz | 1955–1967 | Reitz's administration was responsible for the largest expansion of the University of Florida's physical plant and the construction of over 300 campus facilities, and he oversaw the peaceful racial integration of the university. The university's first professor to serve as its permanent president, he was an agricultural economist and the university's provost for Agriculture before becoming its president. Reitz remained actively involved in the university's fund-raising activities until his death in 1993. |
| 6 | | Stephen C. O'Connell | 1967–1973 | Stephen C. O'Connell's presidential administration oversaw university enrollment increases, expansion of educational opportunities for African-American students, reorganized the alumni association with a new emphasis on private fund-raising, and kept the university open during civil rights and Vietnam war protests. O'Connell was the first alumnus of the University of Florida to serve as its president, and was a justice of the Florida Supreme Court from 1955 to 1967. |
| Interim | | E. Travis York | 1973–1974 | York became the acting president of the University of Florida following the resignation of Stephen C. O'Connell. York also served as the university provost and executive vice president, and was responsible for the founding of the Institute of Food and Agricultural Sciences (IFAS), and was later appointed to be the chancellor of the State University System of Florida from 1975 to 1980. Before becoming provost, York was the head of the Alabama and United States agricultural extension services. |
| 7 | | Robert Q. Marston | 1974–1984 | Marston was a Rhodes Scholar, medical doctor and research scientist. Marston established programs to attract National Merit Scholars, helped establish the State of Florida's Eminent Scholars Program, and dramatically increased the university's private financial support. During his tenure, the university matured into one of the nation's ten largest single-campus universities and one of the three most comprehensive in the scope of its academic programs. Marston had served as the director of the National Institutes of Health and dean of the University of Mississippi School of Medicine. |
| 8 | | Marshall M. Criser, Jr. | 1984–1989 | Criser guided the University of Florida's application to the Association of American Universities (AAU), initiated the most successful fund-raising campaign in the history of the University of Florida, reduced the size of the undergraduate student body while maintaining faculty and state funding, increased admissions standards and upper-division academic progress requirements, and dealt with the repercussions of NCAA football infractions. He had served as the chairman of the Florida Board of Regents and the president of The Florida Bar. |
| Interim | | Robert A. Bryan | 1989–1990 | Bryan became the acting president of the University of Florida after the resignation of Marshall Criser, and was responsible for the removal of the football and basketball head coaches for violations of NCAA rules and the beginning of new athletic oversight reforms. Memorably, he led the negotiations to bring former Gators quarterback and Heisman Trophy-winner Steve Spurrier back to his alma mater as its new head football coach in 1990. Bryan had served as the university provost and vice president for academic affairs, and had helped to improve the university's academic programs. He later served as the interim president of the University of Central Florida in 1991 and the interim president of the University of South Florida from 1993 to 1994. |
| 9 | | John V. Lombardi | 1990–1999 | Lombardi became the president of the University of Florida with the mission of leading it "into the top tier of American universities." Lombardi reasserted active control over the university's athletic program, guided the university community through the crisis and aftermath of the Danny Rollings murders, promoted the aggressive adoption of new technologies, and allocated funds among the university's colleges and departments based on productivity and tangible success. Before becoming president of the university, he was a Latin American history professor and served as the provost of Johns Hopkins University; subsequently, he was the chancellor of the University of Massachusetts Amherst and was a former president of the Louisiana State University System. |
| 10 | | Charles E. Young | 1999–2003 | Young led the university into the 21st century, guiding it through a difficult time of recession, coping with its new governing structure and the aftermath of the September 11 terrorist attacks, extending the university's capital campaign, and implementing its first strategic plan. Young had been a political science professor and served twenty-nine years as the chancellor of the University of California at Los Angeles (UCLA). |
| 11 | | Bernie Machen | 2003–2014 | Machen and his administration worked to improve diversity, sustainability, and graduate education. Machen had been the dean of the University of North Carolina school of dentistry, the provost and executive vice president for academic affairs of the University of Michigan, and the president of the University of Utah. He now serves as senior adviser to the University of Florida board of trustees and President Kent Fuchs, raising money for endowed faculty positions and the Florida Opportunity Scholars Program that bears Machen's name. |
| 12 | | Kent Fuchs | 2015–2023 | Fuchs assumed office on January 1, 2015, and left office on February 6, 2023. |
| 13 | | Ben Sasse | 2023–2024 | Sasse was president of the University of Florida until July 31, 2024. He assumed office on February 6, 2023. |
| Interim | | Kent Fuchs | 2024–2025 | Fuchs became the interim president of the University of Florida following the resignation of Ben Sasse. He also served as the 12th president of the University of Florida from 2015 to 2023, preceding Sasse. |
| Interim | | Donald Landry | 2025–present | Landry was named interim president after Fuchs' contract expired and the search process to select a new president was re-started. |
| 14 | | Stuart R. Bell | 2026–present | Bell was elected as the president of UF in 2026. |

== Timeline of University of Florida presidential terms ==
Presidents of the University of Florida

== See also ==
- Florida Gators
- History of the University of Florida
- List of University of Florida alumni
- List of University of Florida faculty and administrators
- List of University of Florida honorary degree recipients

== Bibliography ==
- Armstrong, Orland Kay, The Life and Work of Dr. A.A. Murphree, The Record Company, St. Augustine, Florida (1928).
- Barnett, Albert E., Andrew Sledd: His Life and Work, Candler School of Theology, Emory University, Atlanta, Georgia (1956).
- Farr, James M., The Making of a University (unpublished manuscript), University of Florida, George A. Smathers Libraries, Special Collections, Gainesville, Florida (c. 1935–1941).
- Osborn, George Coleman, John James Tigert: American Educator, The University Presses of Florida, Gainesville, Florida (1974).
- Pleasants, Julian M., Gator Tales: An Oral History of the University of Florida, University of Florida, Gainesville, Florida (2006). ISBN 0-8130-3054-4
- Proctor, Samuel, & Wright Langley, Gator History: A Pictorial History of the University of Florida, South Star Publishing Company, Gainesville, Florida (1986). ISBN 0-938637-00-2.
- Van Ness, Carl, & Kevin McCarthy, Honoring the Past, Shaping the Future: The University of Florida, 1853–2003, University of Florida, Gainesville, Florida (2003).
