= Pericles (disambiguation) =

Pericles was a prominent and influential statesman, orator, and general of Athens during the city's Golden Age.

Pericles or Perikles may also refer to:

- Pericles (ship), a sailing ship launched in 1877
- SS Duncan U. Fletcher, a Liberty ship renamed Pericles in 1947
- SS Pericles, an ocean liner which sank in 1910
- Perikles (name), a list of people with the given name Pericles, Perikles or Periklis
- Pericles, Prince of Tyre, a play at least partly by William Shakespeare
- Perikles (band), a Swedish dansband
- Perikles, a board game designed by Martin Wallace
- Péricles de Andrade Maranhão, who signed only as Péricles, was a Brazilian cartoonist and caricaturist
- Péricles (singer), a Brazilian singer

== See also ==
- Pericle, a given name
- Pericles' Funeral Oration, by the Athenian
- Pericles with the Corinthian helmet, a lost statue known from copies
- Project Pericles, a non-profit organization
