= Inter-Residence Hall Association (University of Florida) =

- Logo as of 2023
- Abbreviation: IRHA
- Predecessor: Inter-Hall Council
- Formation: 1978; 48 years ago
- Type: Residence hall association
- Headquarters: Rawlings Hall, Gainesville, Florida
- President: Sydney Fayad
- Vice President: Mar Socias
- Affiliations: University of Florida Department of Housing and Residence Life
- Website: Inter-Residence Hall Association

The University of Florida Inter-Residence Hall Association (IRHA) is a student organization of the University of Florida that acts as an association of on-campus undergraduate residents and represents them to the university housing department. IRHA is a residence hall association (RHA) and is the exclusive such organization for University of Florida undergraduates (except for undergraduates who are married/parents living in the five graduate/family villages, who are represented by Mayors' Council, the graduate student equivalent organization to IRHA). IRHA is one of the largest student organizations on campus and, historically, one of the most influential on university policy.

IRHA's headquarters are provided by the university's housing department and are located on campus at Rawlings Hall.

IRHA shares its office with the James C. Grimm chapter of the National Residence Hall Honorary and is a member of the National Association of College and University Residence Halls, a national affiliate organization.

== History ==
=== Predecessors ===
The first residence hall association on campus was proposed at a meeting of resident assistants at Fletcher Hall in 1949. At the meeting, led by residence hall director, Claude Hawkins, several committees were formed that would cover different fields of service to residents. Those committees included an orientation committee (responsible for new student's orientation), policy committee (responsible for advocacy to the housing department regarding policy), student government committee (responsible for negotiating for a more formal organization), and social committee (responsible for event programming for residents). By and large, these are the same purposes that later successor organizations would have as well. The organization that grew out of this meeting came to be known as the Residence Hall Association, broken up by gender between a men's and women's organization.

The individual organizations, now part of IRHA, that represent different residence hall areas are known as area governments (abbreviated as "AGs"). AGs have existed since at least 1958, with Murphree Area Council and Tolbert Area Council being mentioned in The Florida Alligator around this time. AGs existed prior to this in the form of "hall councils" that represented individual halls rather than residence hall areas. Hall Councils were nominally considered a direct part of student government during this time frame.

The President's Council had replaced the Men's Residence Hall Association in 1962. Some AGs were independent of the President's Councils, with Murphree Area Council being listed as a separate organization on campus event lists during this time. The President's Council floundered in accomplishing its goals and was soon replaced with the longer lasting Interhall Council. The Interhall Council had existed at different points in the past, acting as an intermediary of the AGs.

The Interhall Council is the immediate predecessor organization to IRHA, and was established and operating in 1965. Like its predecessors, the Interhall Council was made up of two different organizations segregated by gender. The organizations merged in 1973, after the only remaining female only residence halls, the Broward/Rawlings Area, and the last male only area, Murphree Area, were made co-ed.

The Inter-Residence Hall Association was founded in 1978. The Interhall Council continued for a few years, at least until 1980, with AGs having representation in both. IRHA assumed the responsibilities and operations of the Interhall Council sometime soon after.

=== 20th Century ===
Since its founding, IRHA has been heavily involved in student involvement and runs programming and events for residents and students in-general. AGs lead the majority of events and operate event programming at the residence hall area level, while IRHA runs events campus-wide. IRHA's largest series of events, Residence Hall Week, is held at the beginning of the academic year and acts as a welcome week to new and returning students.

In the early days of the organization, IRHA established and backed its own political party in the university's student government, called the Inter-Residence Hall Association Party. The party changed its name soon after its establishment, being renamed the Independent Students Alliance. The party eventually changed its name once more to the Student Alliance Party and operated until around 2010, though largely detached from IRHA by the time of its disbanding. While the two organizations are independent of each other, some members of IRHA occasionally participate in both student government and IRHA.

IRHA has supported efforts to prevent sexual assault on the university's campus. In 1984, the organizations made efforts to establish working committees to prevent such crimes. IRHA funded on-campus buses and shuttles operating at night (now known as the SNAP shuttles and Later Gator program). IRHA continued to fund it into sometime in the 21st century when student government took over funding and operations.

Until 1985, IRHA and IRHA-affiliated AGs were allowed to serve alcohol at events. In 1990, IRHA additionally voted to support rule changes limiting alcohol in residence halls. Including this occasion, until at least the mid-1990s, certain rules regarding resident safety and housing operations were put up to votes of the IRHA general body.

IRHA has, previously, led a number of public service campaigns. In 1986, IRHA led the University of Florida's branch of a widely publicized statewide campaign to limit drunk driving and excessive alcohol consumption over the winter break of the academic year. IRHA led a largely successful voter registration drive in 1988.

IRHA has written guides for new students coming to the University of Florida, which they have done since at least 1987.

Since at least 1991, AGs have arranged for "permanent improvements", physical improvements to the amenities and facilities of their residence hall area.

=== 21st Century ===
UF IRHA has been running its signature "Writing on the Wall" event since 2002. Writing on the Wall is an event program where participants are encouraged to write the disparaging words spoken to them throughout the years on a temporary wall. The words are used to change the conversation at a closing ceremony. The wall is then publicly changed to make the words into positive versions. However, in 2025, the event was changed to instead have positive affirmations written on the bricks to uplift onlookers, and the wall was left up as artwork for everyone to see. The event has received both local and national coverage and has inspired a number of similar events held in other universities in the United States.

In 2006, IRHA and the housing department sponsored a campus-wide challenge to limit the waste of energy and bettering the eco-friendliness of residence hall buildings and campus facilities.

In 2016, the senior director of the university housing department that typically oversees IRHA was charged for embezzling money from the university using an account that had been earmarked for the organization's funding. The scandal involved the dismissal of seven employees of the department and two criminal charges. Despite IRHA not actually being involved in the scandal, financial restrictions, funding limitations, and operations restrictions were placed by the new housing administration on the organization and the AGs, which as of 2026, still remain in place. Before this time, AGs had the capability to cash checks for residents and sell membership cards to help boost funding, capabilities no longer given to the area governments. IRHA's leadership and the AGs have, additionally, since had difficulty working with other departments of the university operationally.

IRHA's advocacy operations were slowed in the after-math of the COVID-19 pandemic, only beginning to return in 2023.

A new AG was created in 2023 (known as the Village Area Council, or VAC) with the partial opening of the Honors Village at UF, designated to serve UF's honors program.

The Graham Area Council (GAC) is currently inactive as of Fall 2025, as teardown efforts have begun in the area.

== Organization ==
=== Leadership ===
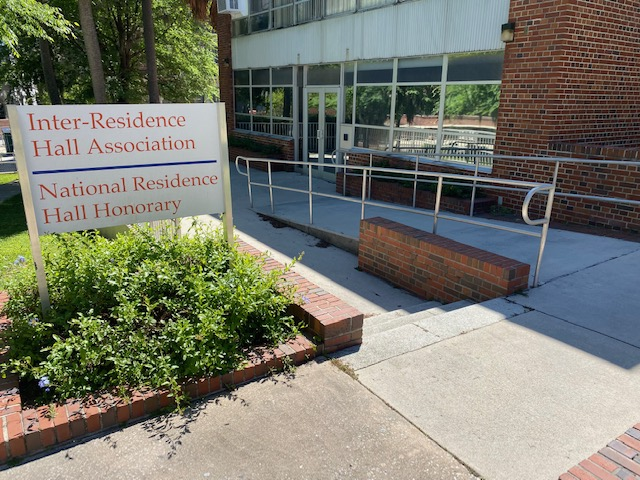
IRHA's headquarters at Rawlings Hall

The organization is made up of a general body and an executive board. The general body is made up of the members of the area governments' executive boards, members-at-large who apply to join and are accepted by vote of the general body, and directors appointed by the president of the organization.

The executive board is made up of the top leadership of the organization and is elected for the next academic year by the members of the general body. There are six positions on the executive board: President, Vice President, Auditor, Parliamentarian, Operations Manager, and Communications Coordinator-NCC.

The current executive board for the 2026-2027 academic year is as follows:

Year	Position	Name
2026-2027	President	Sydney Fayad
2026-2027	Vice President	Mar Socias
2026-2027	Auditor	Oliver Hegarty
2026-2027	Parliamentarian	Erin Doss
2026-2027	Operations Manager	Lucas Nadeau
2026-2027	Communications Coordinator-NCC	Alyza Perez

A staff member of the housing department (usually a residence director) is tasked with being the staff advisor of the organization and a graduate student is tasked with being the graduate advisor of the organization. For the 2025-2026 academic year, Anthony Ward and Alexandra Escalera serve as the staff advisor and graduate assistant, respectively.

=== Area Governments ===
IRHA acts as a central organization where a number of smaller organizations representing residents from individual residence hall areas take part in. Many AGs have traditional events held annually or near annually, such as Haunted Thomas held by Murphree Area Council. Each area government has its own office near its respective area desk office. As of Fall 2025, there are 11 AGs representing individual collections of undergraduate residence halls on campus:

- Beaty Towers Area Government (BTAG)
- Broward-Rawlings Area Government (BRAG)
- Hume Area Council (HAC)
- Infinity Council (INC)
- Jennings Area Government (JAG)
- Lakeside Area Residential Council (LARC)
- Murphree Area Council (MAC)
- Springs-Keys Council on Residential Experience (SKCORE)
- Tolbert Area Council (TAC)
- Village Area Council (VAC)
- Yulee Area Council (YAC)

Area Governments occasionally merge or change names. Hume Area Council (HAC), for example, originated as the Student Honor Organization (SHO) and Broward-Rawlings Area Government (BRAG) previously operated as Rawlings Area Council.

The Area Governments are also used within the student government structure at UF to allocate seats for their Student Senate.

The Graham Area Council (GAC) is currently inactive as of Fall 2025, as teardown efforts have begun in the area.

=== National Residence Hall Honorary ===
UF IRHA co-operates and shares offices with the University of Florida's chapter (the James C. Grimm Chapter) of the National Residence Hall Honorary.

== Past Executive Boards ==
Below is a list of all of the past IRHA Executive Boards. The constitution of IRHA is always being updated via legislation, so certain roles have been added and changed over time.

- Effective in the 1979-1980 academic year, the board expanded from four to five members with the addition of Auditor as its own, independent position.
- Effective in the 2003-2004 academic year, the board expanded from five to six members with the addition of the National Communications Coordinator (NCC).
- Effective in the 2018-2019 academic year, the position of Marketing Coordinator was created, and the NCC duties were absorbed by this position.
- The 2019-2020 executive board's Auditor position was vacant for most of the year.
- Effective in the 2023-2024 academic year, the position of "Business Manager" was changed to "Operations Manager", the position of "Secretary" was changed to "Parliamentarian", and the position of "Marketing Coordinator-NCC" was changed to "Communications Coordinator-NCC".

Year	Position	Name
2025-2026	President	Carolina Calonge
2025-2026	Vice President	Amaya Borroto
2025-2026	Auditor	Sydney Fayad
2025-2026	Parliamentarian	Jon Hymes
2025-2026	Operations Manager	Mar Socias
2025-2026	Communications Coordinator-NCC	Daniel De Aguiar (2025)
2025-2026	Communications Coordinator-NCC	Alyza Perez (2026)
2024-2025	President	Kaylee Kedroski
2024-2025	Vice President	Amaya Borroto
2024-2025	Auditor	George Glynatsis
2024-2025	Parliamentarian	Raj Selvaraj
2024-2025	Operations Manager	Carolina Calonge
2024-2025	Communications Coordinator-NCC	Bella Angotti
2023-2024	President	Kara Sammetinger
2023-2024	Vice President	Remy Ronkin
2023-2024	Auditor	Jacob Fink
2023-2024	Parliamentarian	Julia Haley
2023-2024	Operations Manager	Chris Georgas
2023-2024	Communications Coordinator-NCC	Kaylee Kedroski
2022-2023	President	Justine Tryon
2022-2023	Vice President	Remy Ronkin
2022-2023	Auditor	Kaitlyn Turner
2022-2023	Business Manager	Chris Georgas
2022-2023	Secretary	Jacob Fink
2022-2023	Marketing Coordinator-NCC	Kara Sammetinger
2021-2022	President	Amanda DeVinney
2021-2022	Vice President	John Lin
2021-2022	Auditor	Kaitlyn Turner
2021-2022	Business Manager	Saahil Naik
2021-2022	Secretary	Justine Tryon
2021-2022	Marketing Coordinator-NCC	Kara Sammetinger
2020-2021	President	Colin Solomon
2020-2021	Vice President	Amanda DeVinney
2020-2021	Auditor	Damon Veras
2020-2021	Business Manager	Saahil Naik
2020-2021	Secretary	Justine Tryon
2020-2021	Marketing Coordinator-NCC	Kim Suarez
2019-2020	President	Heidi Doods
2019-2020	Vice President	Seth Piatek
2019-2020	Auditor	Vacant
2019-2020	Business Manager	Saahil Naik
2019-2020	Secretary	Paris Miller
2019-2020	Marketing Coordinator-NCC	Kim Suarez
2018-2019	President	Heidi Doods
2018-2019	Vice President	Arham Khan
2018-2019	Auditor	Jared Machado
2018-2019	Business Manager	Seth Piatek
2018-2019	Secretary	Kaitlynn Friscoe
2018-2019	Marketing Coordinator-NCC	Eric Pujols
2017-2018	President	Anthony Sanchez
2017-2018	Vice President	Shelby Harding
2017-2018	Auditor	William Petro
2017-2018	Business Manager	Ali Gardezi
2017-2018	Secretary	Peter Ashley
2017-2018	NCC	Adam Turner
2016-2017	President	Jackie Phillips
2016-2017	Vice President	Sean Carey
2016-2017	Auditor	Cole Gabriel
2016-2017	Business Manager	Carrie Wilkey
2016-2017	Secretary	Emily Walters
2016-2017	NCC	Anthony Sanchez
2015-2016	President	Neil DeCenteceo
2015-2016	Vice President	Wayne Selogy
2015-2016	Auditor	Gabrielle Bork (2015)
2015-2016	Auditor	Michael LaBonia (2016)
2015-2016	Business Manager	Sean Carey
2015-2016	Secretary	Jacqueline Phillips
2015-2016	NCC	Lena Schwallenberg
2014-2015	President	Keenen Vernon
2014-2015	Vice President	Jorge Zamarripa
2014-2015	Auditor	Adam Samei
2014-2015	Business Manager	Sean Carey
2014-2015	Secretary	Neil DeCenteceo
2014-2015	NCC	Wayne Selogy
2013-2014	President	Elliot Grasso
2013-2014	Vice President	Rachel Stern
2013-2014	Auditor	Adam Samei
2013-2014	Business Manager	Sean Carey
2013-2014	Secretary	Neil DeCenteceo
2013-2014	NCC	Wayne Selogy
2012-2013	President	Severin Walstad
2012-2013	Vice President	Ashley Richey
2012-2013	Auditor	Elliot Grasso
2012-2013	Business Manager	Andrew Babcock
2012-2013	Secretary	Tantaneya Williams
2012-2013	NCC	Rachel Stern
2011-2012	President	Severin Walstad
2011-2012	Vice President	Ashley Richey
2011-2012	Auditor	Kat Szulc
2011-2012	Business Manager	Paige Phelps
2011-2012	Secretary	Jessica Marine
2011-2012	NCC	Courtney Read
2010-2011	President	Sean Johnson
2010-2011	Vice President	Sakina Sackaloo
2010-2011	Auditor	Munir Valiani
2010-2011	Business Manager	Ashley Richey
2010-2011	Secretary	Severin Walstad
2010-2011	NCC	Lindsey Wuest
2009-2010	President	Patricia Jordan
2009-2010	Vice President	Sean Johnson
2009-2010	Auditor	Josh Perry
2009-2010	Business Manager	Alex Kopson
2009-2010	Secretary	Kalyn Wyckoff
2009-2010	NCC	Sakina Sackaloo
2008-2009	President	Jon Sheffield
2008-2009	Vice President	Patricia Jordan
2008-2009	Auditor	Michael Hoffman
2008-2009	Business Manager	Sean Johnson
2008-2009	Secretary	Connie Lee
2008-2009	NCC	Michael Stromquist
2007-2008	President	Lindsey Johns
2007-2008	Vice President	Jon Sheffield
2007-2008	Auditor	Keith Hardwick
2007-2008	Business Manager	Paul Gunter
2007-2008	Secretary	Patricia Jordon
2007-2008	NCC	Josh Perry
2006-2007	President	E.J. Walicki
2006-2007	Vice President	Lindsey Johns
2006-2007	Auditor	Keith Hardwick
2006-2007	Business Manager	Jon Sheffield
2006-2007	Secretary	Elizabeth Miller
2006-2007	NCC	Rebecca Kreh
2005-2006	President	E.J. Walicki
2005-2006	Vice President	Paul Einselen
2005-2006	Auditor	Tiffany Griffith
2005-2006	Business Manager	Jon Sheffield
2005-2006	Secretary	Jackie Schuld
2005-2006	NCC	Alison Heather
2004-2005	President	Mike Reynolds
2004-2005	Vice President	Elizabeth Williamson
2004-2005	Auditor	E.J. Walicki
2004-2005	Business Manager	Paul Einselen
2004-2005	Secretary	Katherine Cox
2004-2005	NCC	Krystal Juren
2003-2004	President	Jennifer Puckett
2003-2004	Vice President	Adrian McClain
2003-2004	Auditor	Rachel Bolton
2003-2004	Business Manager	Michael Reynolds
2003-2004	Secretary	Richard Gonzalez
2003-2004	NCC	Kellie Olson
2002-2003	President	Jeffrey M. Chernoff
2002-2003	Vice President	Leslie M. Weisstein
2002-2003	Auditor	Jennifer N. Puckett
2002-2003	Business Manager	Jeremy L. Hicks
2002-2003	Secretary	Adrian M. McClain
2001-2002	President	Nicole I. Taub
2001-2002	Vice President	Aja O. Ishmael
2001-2002	Auditor	Jeffrey M. Chernoff
2001-2002	Business Manager	Robert W. Jones
2001-2002	Secretary	Kelly J. Kimbrough
2000-2001	President	Marc A. Dodd
2000-2001	Vice President	Nicole Taub
2000-2001	Auditor	Lee K. Berger
2000-2001	Business Manager	Ian C. Racey
2000-2001	Secretary	Lisa I. Grubbs
1999-2000	President	Suketu R. Pathak
1999-2000	Vice President	Marc A. Dodd
1999-2000	Auditor	Jill L. Zimmerman
1999-2000	Business Manager	Jonathan D. Zerulik
1999-2000	Secretary	Karen A. Peterson
1998-1999	President	Gary S. Slossberg
1998-1999	Vice President	David E. Winchester
1998-1999	Auditor	Edward B. Borden
1998-1999	Business Manager	Suketu R. Pathak
1998-1999	Secretary	Jessica L. Burton
1997-1998	President	Christopher M. Fuller
1997-1998	Vice President	Gary S. Slossberg
1997-1998	Auditor	Jenny M. Labelle
1997-1998	Business Manager	Keith H. Lanson
1997-1998	Secretary	Lindsay B. Gillette
1996-1997	President	Christine M. Steinway
1996-1997	Vice President	Jennifer Crapse
1996-1997	Auditor	Christopher M. Fuller
1996-1997	Business Manager	Laurel M. Ring
1996-1997	Secretary	Sarah E. Rabin
1995-1996	President	Vincent Roberts
1995-1996	Vice President	Christine Steinway
1995-1996	Auditor	Darren Lacoste
1995-1996	Business Manager	Alrica Green
1995-1996	Secretary	Christine Mocerino
1994-1995	President	Raymond V. Plaza
1994-1995	Vice President	Chris Loschiavo
1994-1995	Auditor	Vincent Roberts
1994-1995	Business Manager (Fall)	Amy Pryor
1994-1995	Business Manager (Spring)	Brent Snyder
1994-1995	Secretary	Valerie Incantalupo
1993-1994	President	Benjamin Dubbrin
1993-1994	Vice President	Angela Nicholson
1993-1994	Auditor	Marcy Collier
1993-1994	Business Manager	Raymond V. Plaza
1993-1994	Secretary	Darryl Greeley
1992-1993	President	Juliet Swisher
1992-1993	Vice President	Tara P. Pallack
1992-1993	Auditor	Travis Humphrey
1992-1993	Business Manager	Benjamin Dubbrin
1992-1993	Secretary	Allen Blay
1991-1992	President	Ivy Harris
1991-1992	Vice President	Juliet Swisher
1991-1992	Auditor	Garry Kiraly
1991-1992	Business Manager	David Gaussiran
1991-1992	Secretary	Jason Sabotin
1990-1991	President	Carina Self
1990-1991	Vice President	Rachel Sayers
1990-1991	Auditor	Ivy Harris
1990-1991	Business Manager	Maureen Fitzgibbon
1990-1991	Secretary	Sadie James
1989-1990	President	Byron Stecklein
1989-1990	Vice President	Valeri Alexander
1989-1990	Auditor	Rob Holland
1989-1990	Business Manager	Rob Ostrow
1989-1990	Secretary	Carina Self
1988-1989	President	Glenna Thorton
1988-1989	Vice President	Kim Weiss
1988-1989	Auditor	Byron Stecklein
1988-1989	Business Manager	John Dickinson
1988-1989	Secretary	Valeri Alexander
1987-1988	President	David Bates
1987-1988	Vice President	Joy Taylor
1987-1988	Auditor	Susan Franklin
1987-1988	Business Manager	Sean Schwinghammer
1987-1988	Secretary/Vice President	Glenna Thorton
1986-1987	President	David Bates
1986-1987	Vice President	Lori Lerner
1986-1987	Auditor	Chris Rison
1986-1987	Business Manager	Dan Goldberg
1986-1987	Secretary	Tammi Chertoff
1985-1986	President	Sue Jacoby
1985-1986	Vice President	Chuck Swanson
1985-1986	Auditor	Lori Lerner
1985-1986	Business Manager	David Bates
1985-1986	Secretary	Amy Potter
1984-1985	President	Ron Walkover
1984-1985	Vice President	Anita Owens
1984-1985	Auditor	William Walker
1984-1985	Business Manager	David Lang
1984-1985	Secretary	Cheryl Porter
1983-1984	President	Tija Zitner
1983-1984	Vice President	Juan Cordova
1983-1984	Auditor	Donna Wheeler
1983-1984	Business Manager	Scott Young
1983-1984	Secretary	Regina Arsenault
1982-1983	President	Randy Bodner
1982-1983	Vice President	Alex Abreu
1982-1983	Auditor	Jonathan Andron
1982-1983	Business Manager	Lee White
1982-1983	Secretary	Katherine Surcey
1981-1982	President	Lynda Cohen
1981-1982	Vice President	John Palumbo
1981-1982	Auditor	Michael Stein
1981-1982	Business Manager	Randy Bodner
1981-1982	Secretary	Gaul Lipinski
1980-1981	President	Don Germaise
1980-1981	Vice President	Charna Rogers
1980-1981	Auditor	Michael Stein
1980-1981	Business Manager	Vernon McGrew
1980-1981	Secretary	Sandy Ducane III
1979-1980	President	Maureen Morehouse
1979-1980	Vice President	Debi Vance
1979-1980	Auditor	Steve Kuras
1979-1980	Business Manager	David Nix
1979-1980	Secretary	Susan Morrison
1978-1979	President	Frank Valines
1978-1979	Vice President	Ned Michalek
1978-1979	Auditor / Business Manager	Kyle Price
1978-1979	Secretary	Laura Fleet
