= Yulee area =

- Yulee–Mallory–Reid dormitory complex
- U.S. National Register of Historic Places
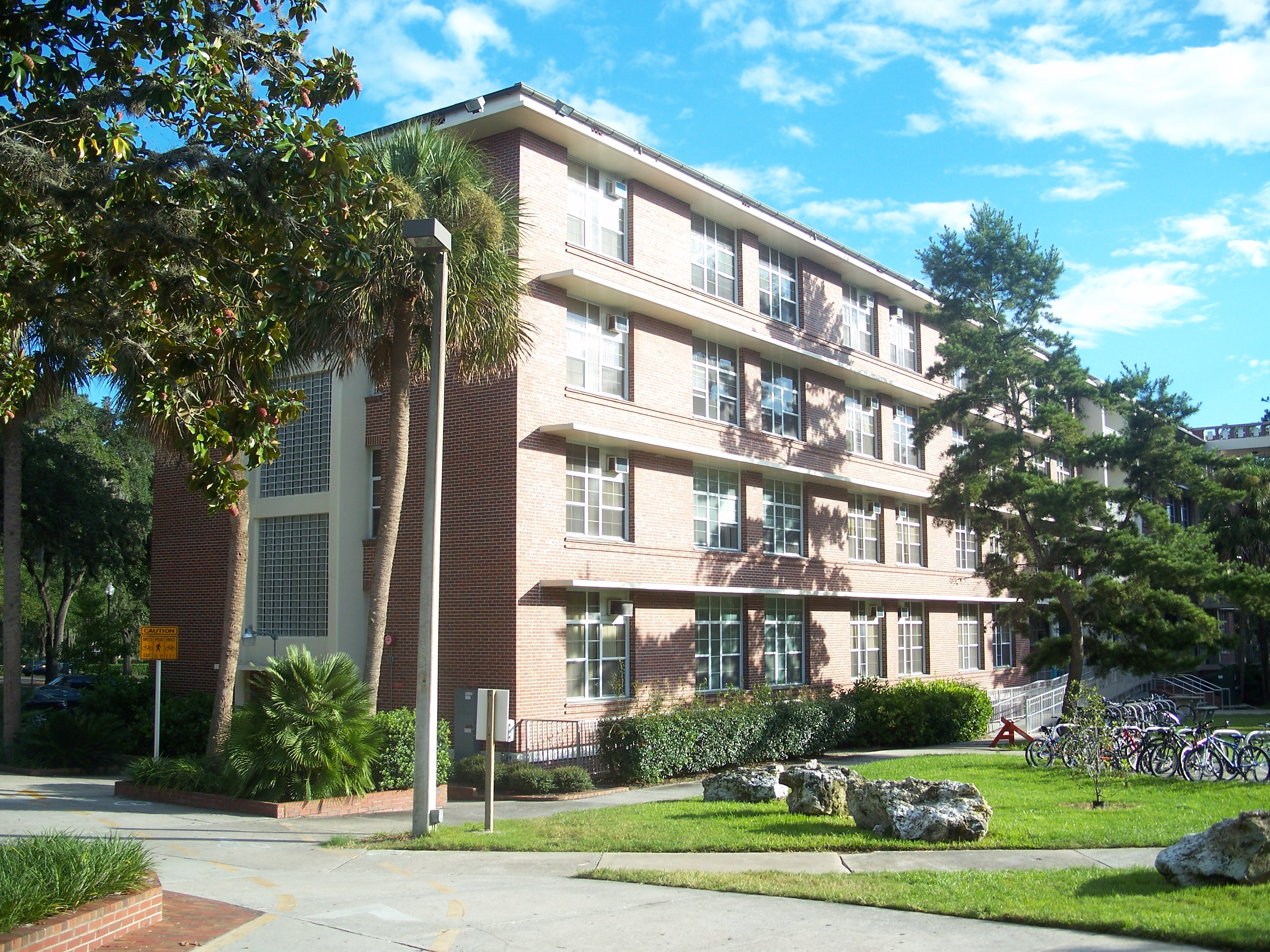
- Reid Hall, part of the complex

- Location within Florida Location within the United States
- Location: Gainesville, Florida, USA
- Coordinates: 29°38′50″N 82°20′28″W
- Built: 1950
- Architect: Guy Fulton
- MPS: University of Florida Campus MPS
- NRHP reference No.: 08000552
- Added to NRHP: June 24, 2008

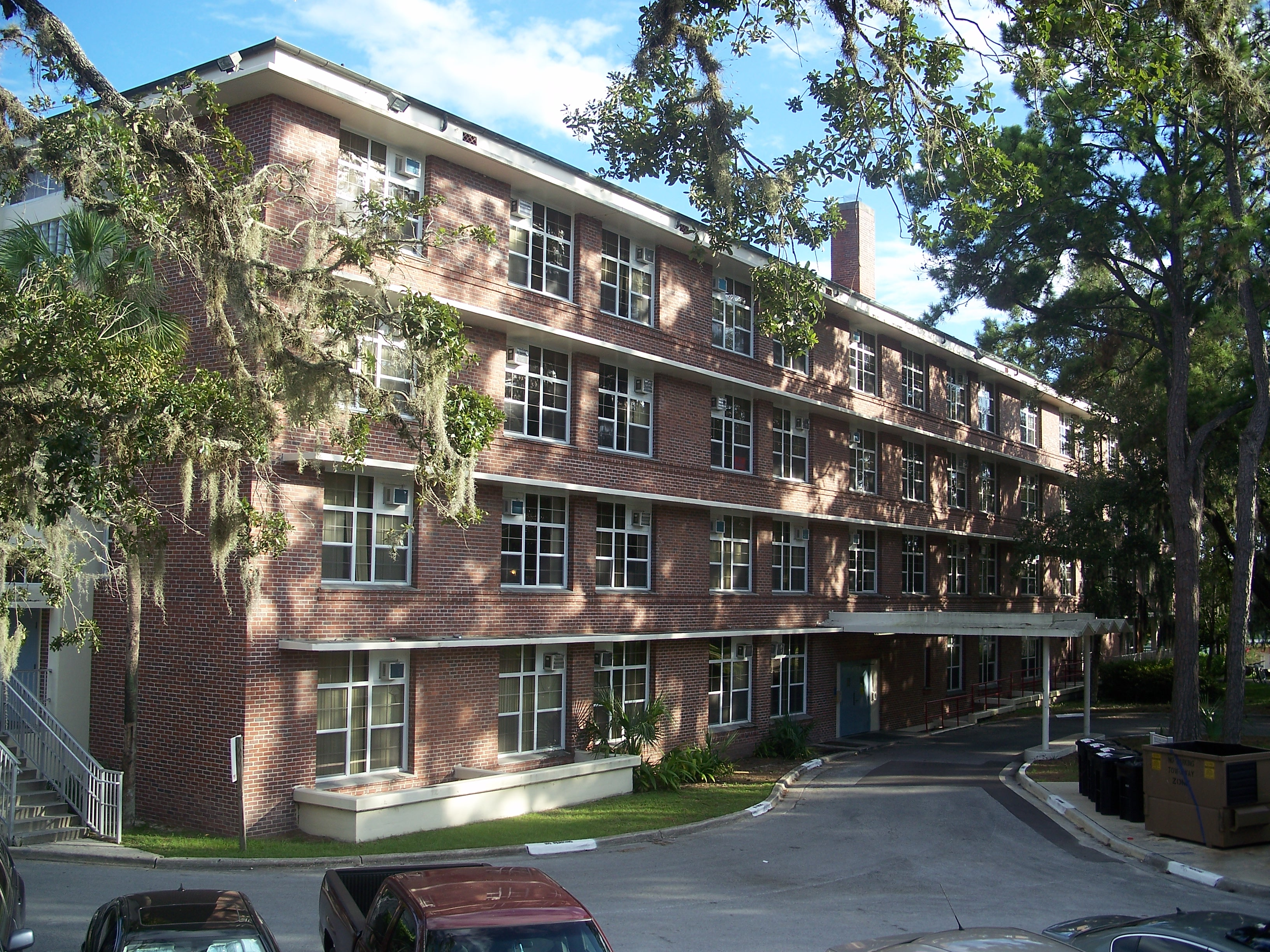
Mallory Hall

The Yulee area (also known as the Yulee–Mallory–Reid dormitory complex) is a historic residence hall complex at 13th Street and Inner Road, SW, on the University of Florida campus in Gainesville, Florida in the United States. It is the site of the first permanent dormitories built for women after the campus became co-educational in 1947. On June 24, 2008, it was added to the National Register of Historic Places.

== History ==
Built in 1950, the four story Mallory, Reid and Yulee halls were designed by Florida Board of Control architect Guy Fulton in a simple, contemporary style in keeping with the board's mandate not to use the more expensive Collegiate Gothic architectural style that had prevailed on campus since its creation in 1905. Fulton, though, did manage to unify the new buildings with the older ones by using the same basic materials of "clay roof tiles, redbrick and stone or concrete trim." Mallory was named for Angela Mallory, wife of U.S. Senator and Confederate cabinet member Stephen Mallory, Reid was named for Mary Martha Reid, a prominent Confederate nurse during the American Civil War, and Yulee was named for Nancy Wycliffe Yulee, daughter of Kentucky Governor and U.S. Postmaster General Charles A. Wickliffe and wife of U.S. Senator David Levy Yulee. These were the first UF buildings to be named for women, albeit in two cases for women whose prominence was based mainly on that of their fathers or husbands.

== Yulee Hall ==
Yulee Hall, the flagship dormitory of the area, contains 94 rooms in single, double and triple style and can house 177 students. It is co-ed by floor. The Yulee area office is located on the first floor of the dorm.

=== Global Living Learning Community ===
The hall is home to the Global Living Learning Community, a program designed to teach residents cultural awareness and keep them in touch with current global events while preparing them to be world leaders.

== Mallory Hall ==
Mallory Hall contains 91 rooms in single, double and triple style and can hold 175 students. It was the last remaining women-only hall until fall of 2004 when it became co-ed by floor.

== Reid Hall ==
Reid Hall contains 86 rooms in single, double and triple style and can house 166 students. It is co-ed by floor.

=== Fine Arts Living Learning Community ===
Located across Inner Road from the College of Fine Arts, Reid is also home to the Fine Arts Living Learning Community, a program designed to nurture students in the visual and performing arts programs.

== Yulee Area Council ==
Yulee Area Council (abbreviated as YAC) is a student organization that represents residents of the area to the Inter-Residence Hall Association and the University of Florida Department of Housing and Residence Life. The organization is one of 11 area governments (abbreviated as AGs) that represent individual areas of residence halls.

YAC was previously abbreviated as RYMAC, standing for Reid, Yulee, Mallory Area Council and, therefore, listing every hall.

== See also ==
- University of Florida
- Buildings at the University of Florida
- University of Florida student housing
