= University of Florida student housing =

Coordinates: 29.6474°N 82.3454°W

Student Housing
- Established: 1906
- Director: Norbert Dunkel
- Students: 9,200
- Location: Gainesville, Florida, United States
- Website: housing.ufl.edu

Student housing at University of Florida is governed by the Division of Student Affairs, and provides housing for undergraduate, graduate, and professional students on and off-campus.

Approximately 8,100 students live in single-student residence halls. Nearly 1,600 students and their families also live on campus in 980 apartments arranged in Village Communities.

== Undergraduate Housing ==
=== East Campus Residence Halls ===
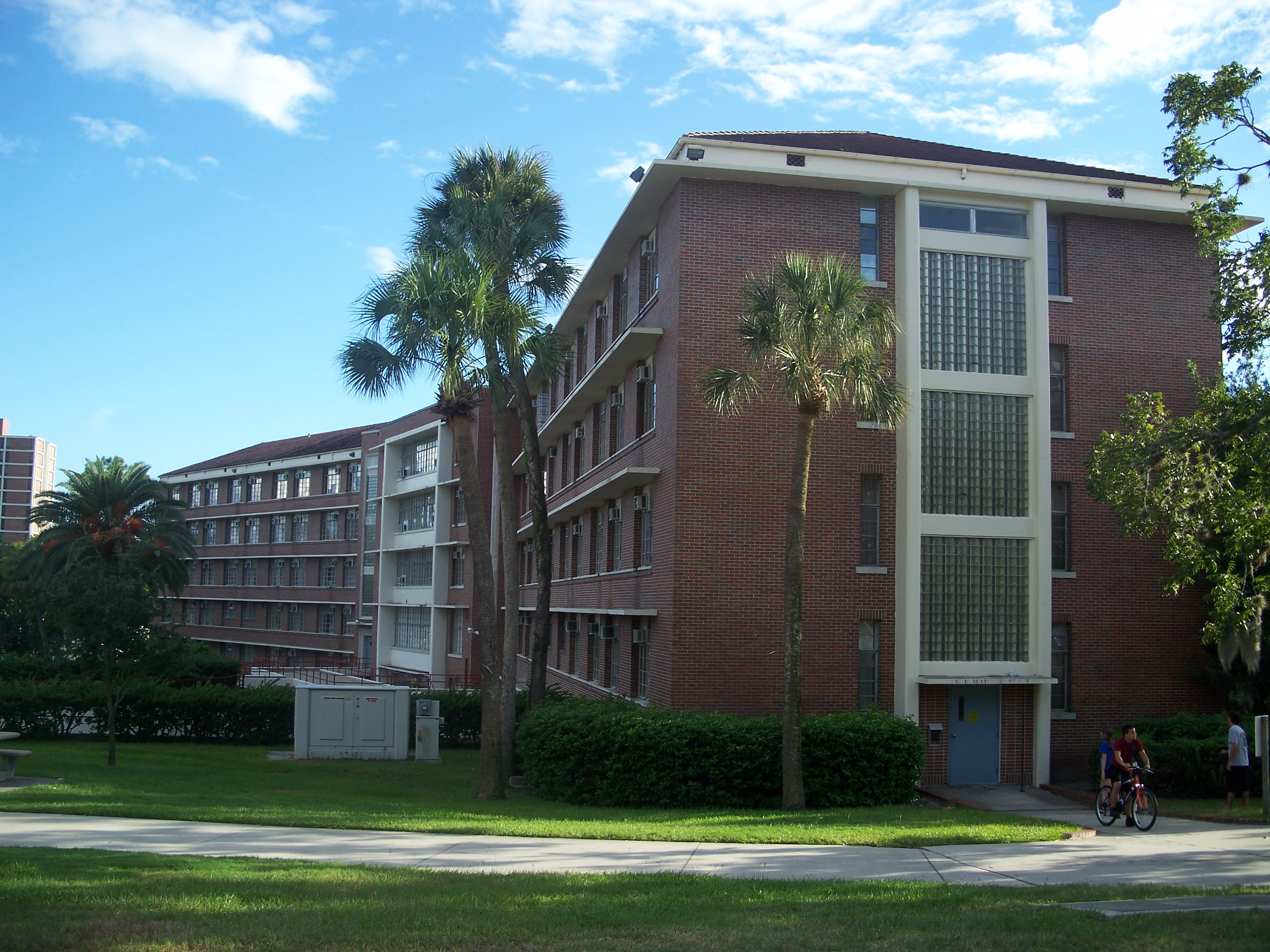
Broward Hall, built in 1954, originally housed female students; similar to many other campus buildings built during that era, its architecture amalgamates Collegiate Gothic and Brutalist styles.

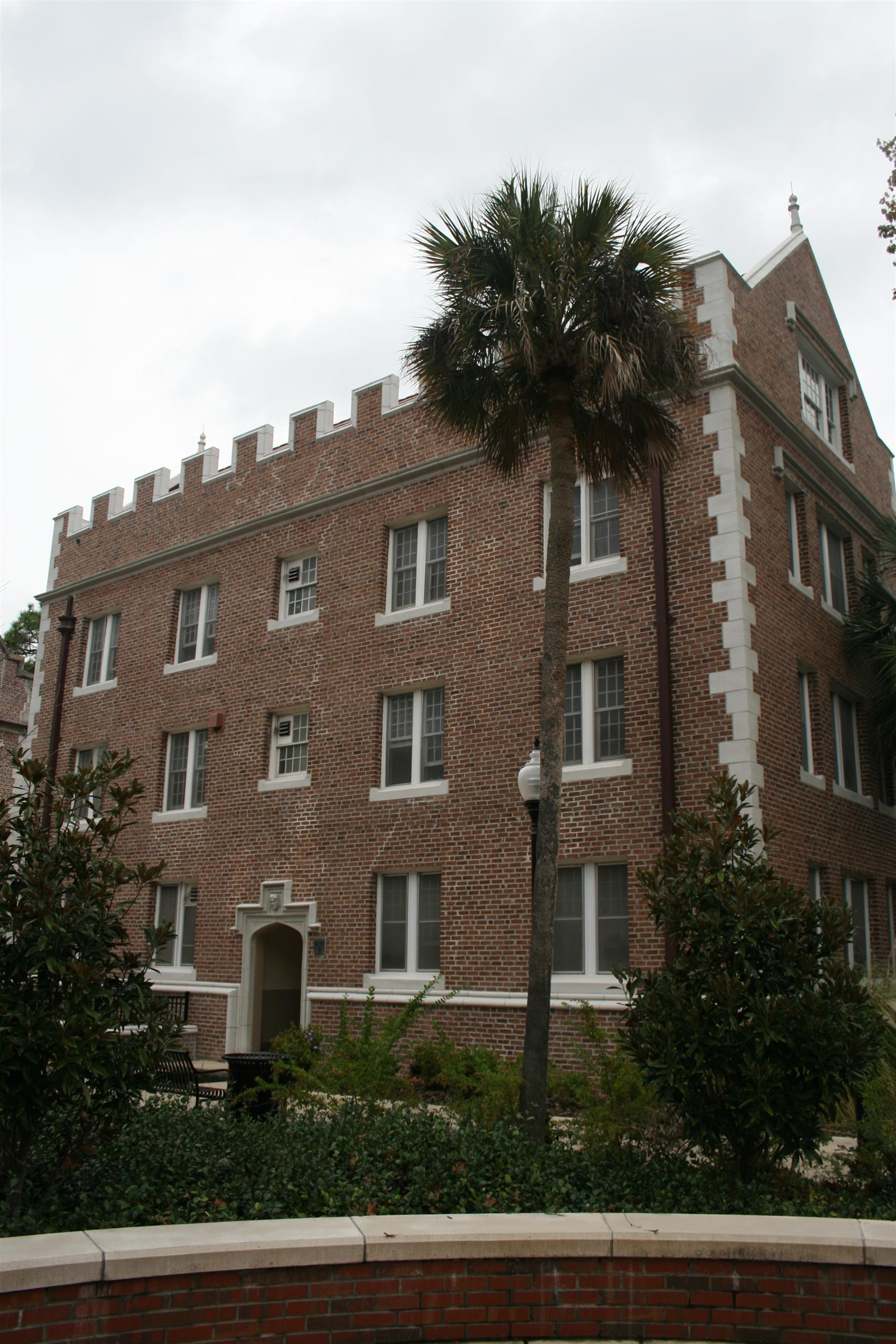
Buckman Hall was built in 1906 and is one of the oldest buildings at the university.

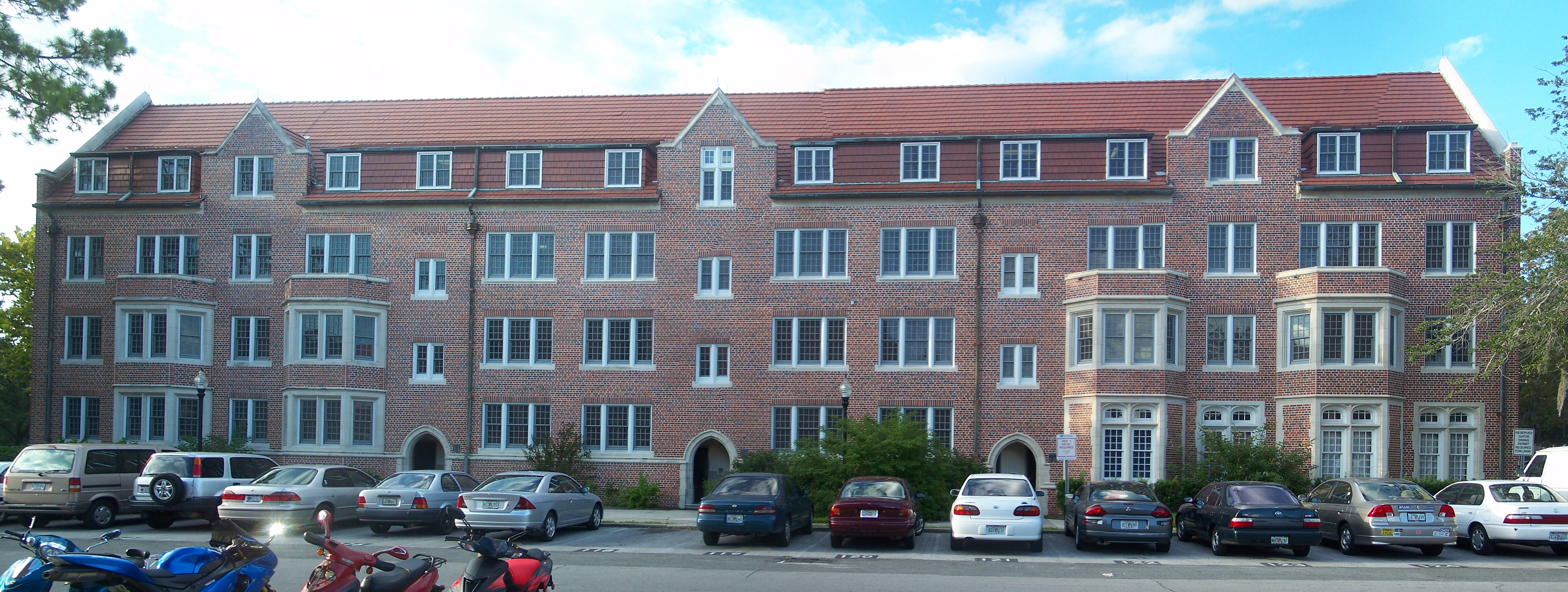
Murphree Hall, built in 1939

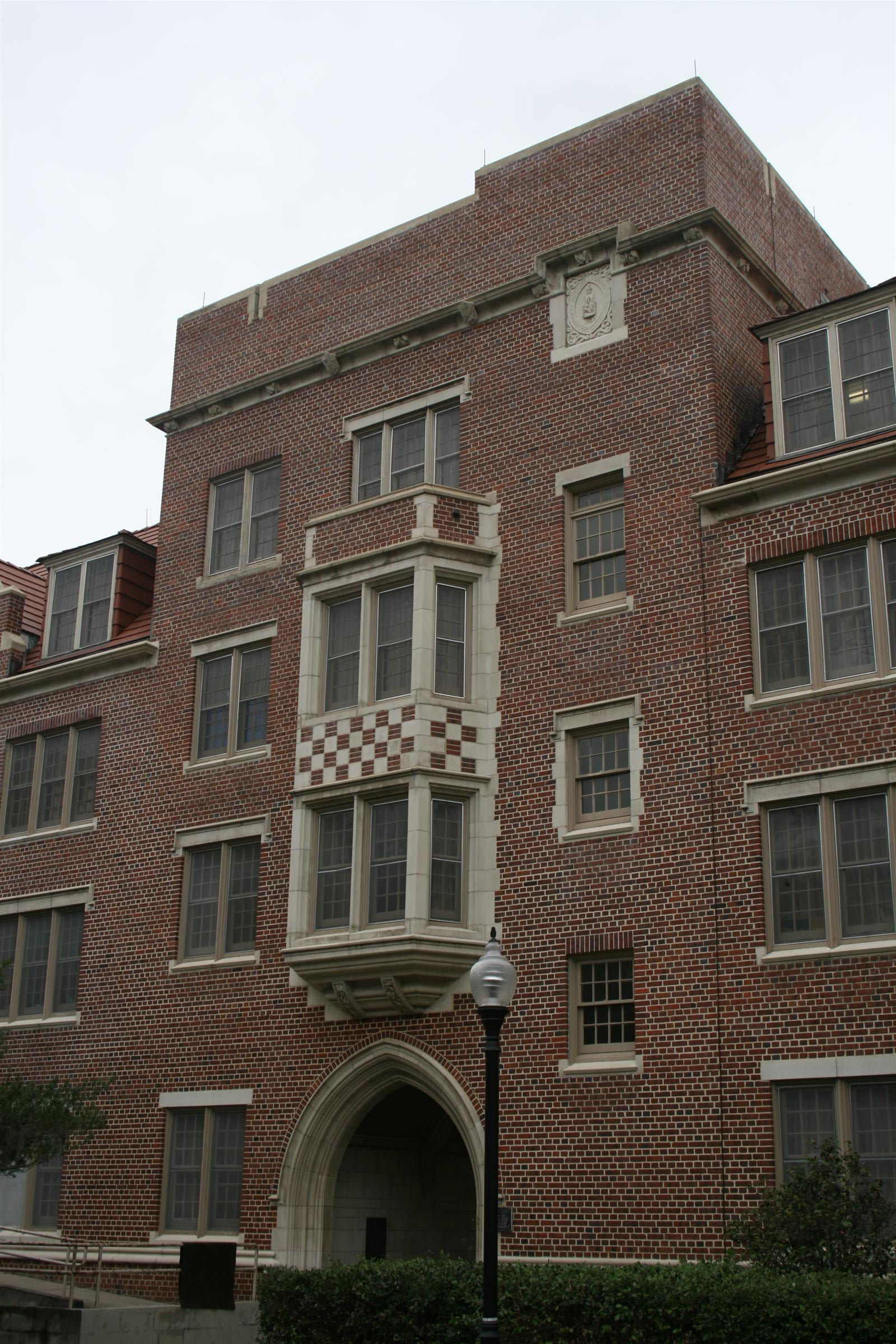
Fletcher Hall, built in 1938

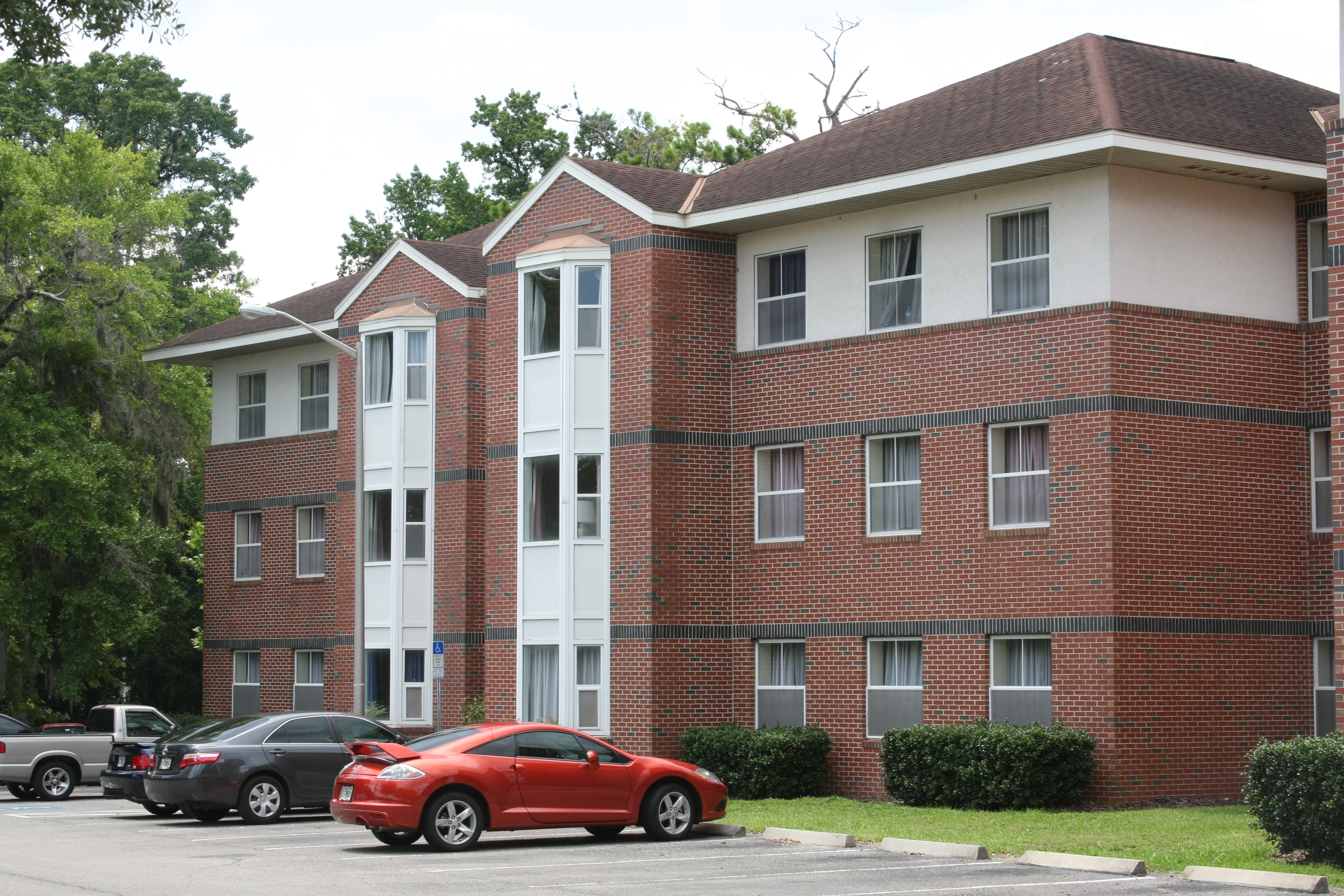
Keys Residential Complex opened in 1991 as apartment-style student housing

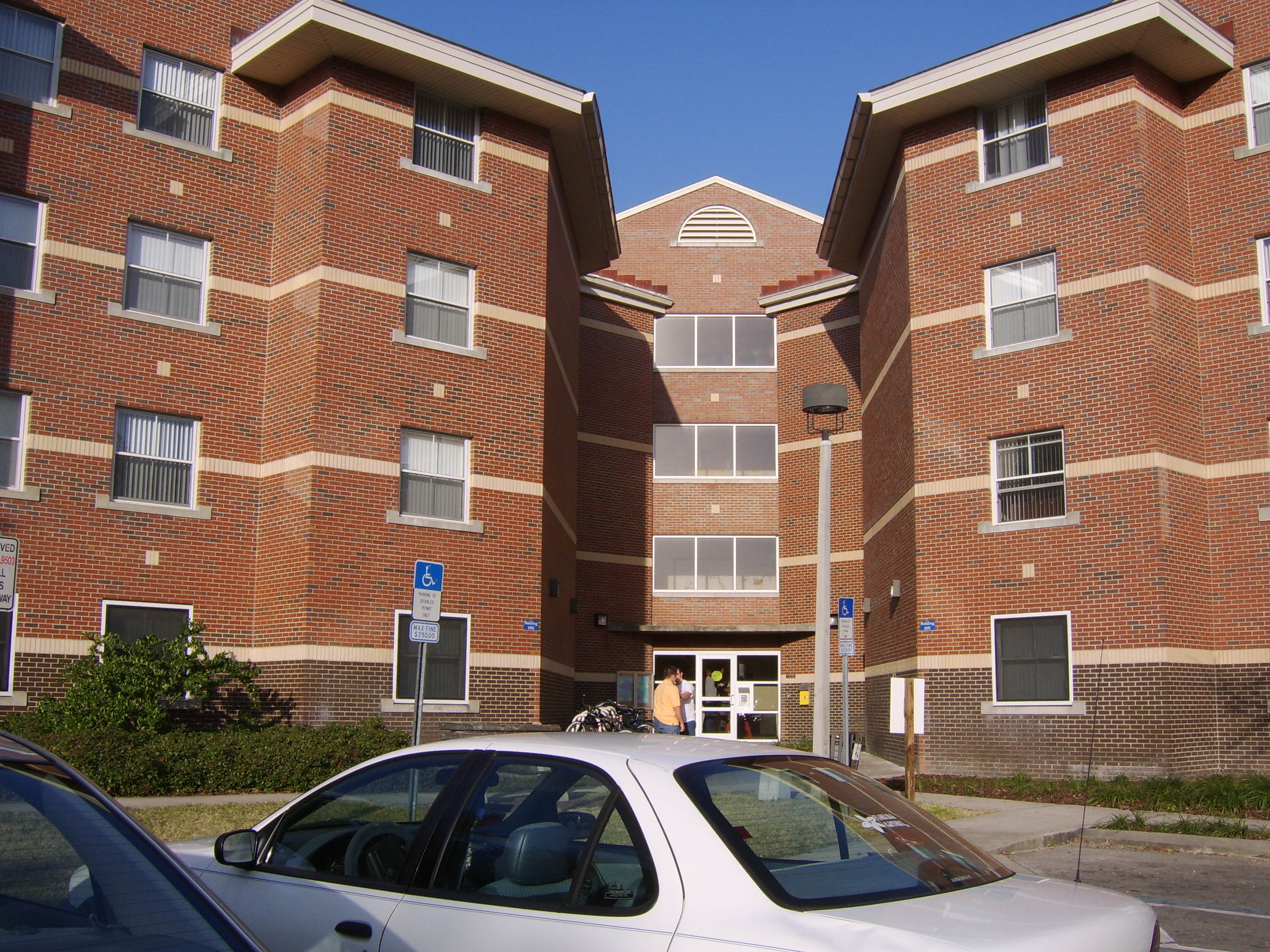
Springs Residential Complex, built in 1995, replaced existing facilities located at the Ben Hill Griffin Stadium.

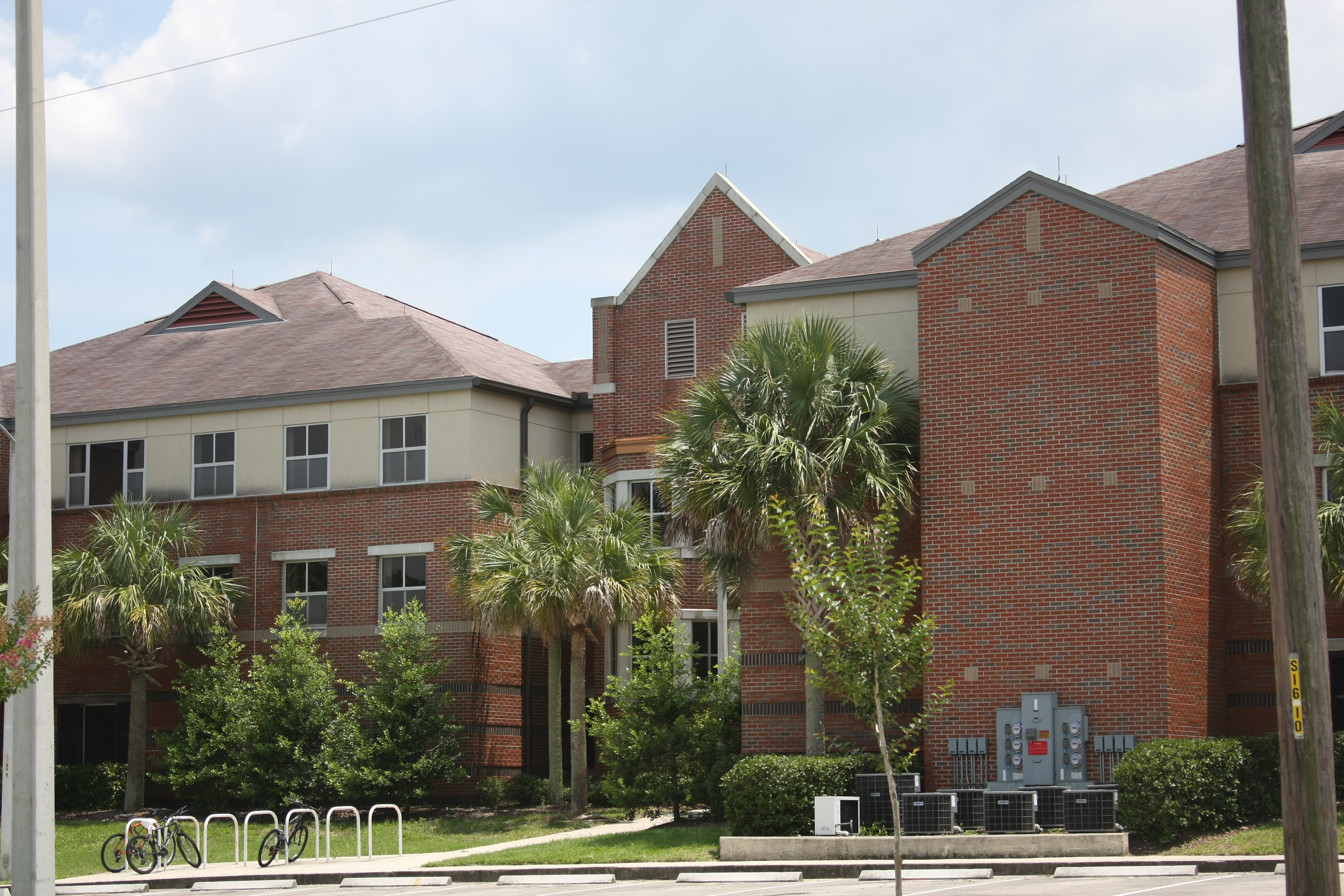
Lakeside Residential Complex, built in 2000

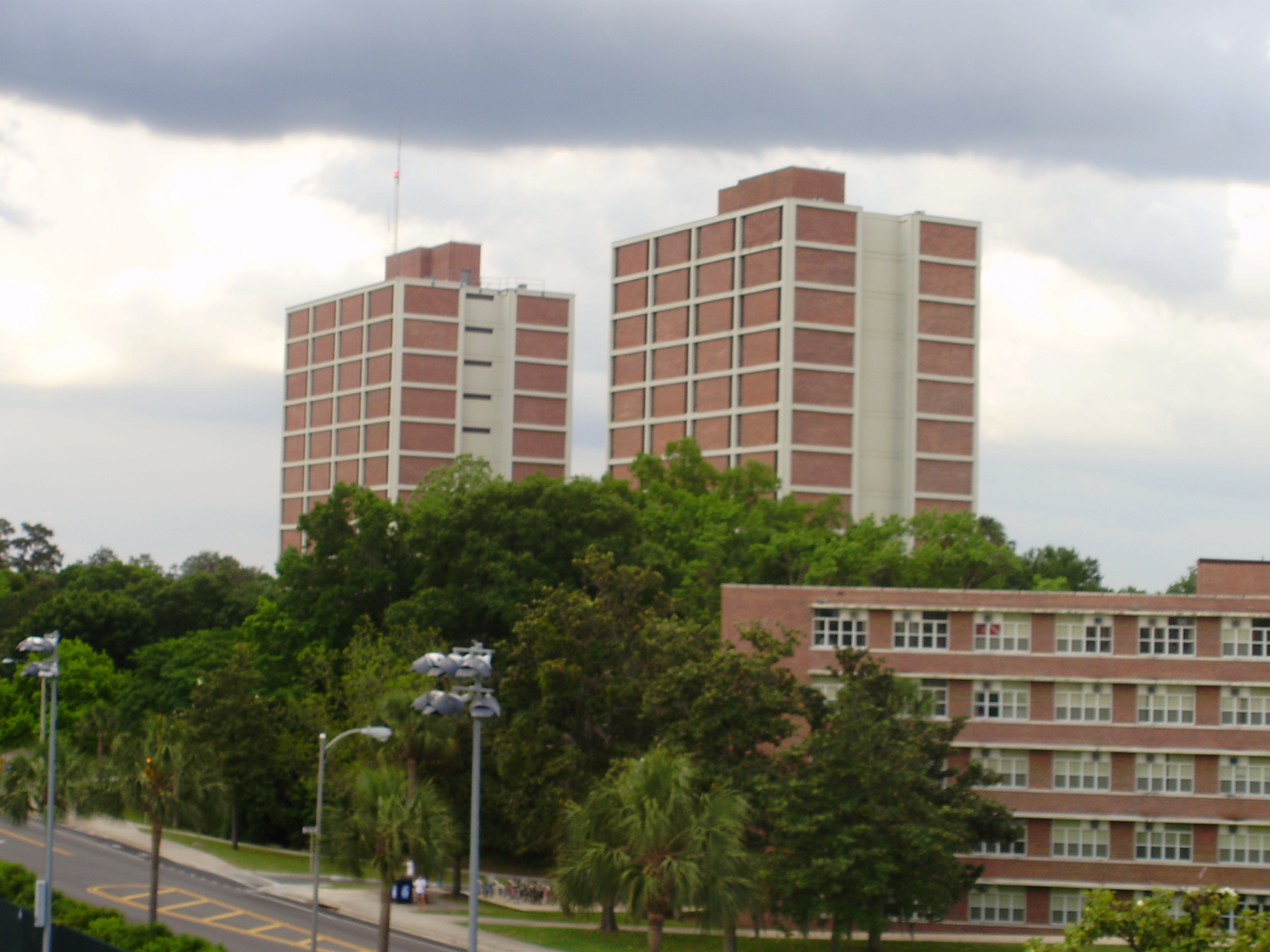
Beaty Towers, built in 1967, is the subject of a popular urban legend

Murphree Area

- Henry H. Buckman Hall (1905)
  - Buckman Hall
  - Capacity: 126
  - Rooms: 82
  - Registered Historic Building
- William R. Thomas Hall (1905)
  - Thomas Hall
  - Capacity: 170
  - Rooms: 109
  - Registered Historic Building
- Andrew Sledd Hall (1929)
  - Sledd Hall
  - Capacity: 187
  - Rooms: 98
  - Registered Historic Building
- Duncan U. Fletcher Hall (1939)
  - Fletcher Hall
  - Capacity: 166
  - Rooms: 87
  - Registered Historic Building
- Albert A. Murphree Hall (1939)
  - Murphree Hall
  - Capacity: 348
  - Rooms: 169
  - Registered Historic Building

Honors Residential College (2023)

- Honors Village
- Capacity: 1,407

Yulee Area

- Nancy W. Yulee Hall (1950)
  - Yulee Hall
  - Capacity: 177
  - Rooms: 94
  - Global Living Learning Community
- Angela Mallory Hall (1950)
  - Mallory Hall
  - Capacity: 175
  - Rooms: 91
- Mary M. Reid Hall (1950)
  - Reid Hall
  - Capacity: 166
  - Rooms: 86
  - Fine Arts Living Learning Community
- Cypress Hall (2015)
  - Cypress Hall
  - Capacity: 255
  - Rooms: 131

Annie I. Broward Hall (1954)

- Broward Hall
- Capacity: 690
- Rooms: 325
- Faculty-in-Residence Community

Marjorie K. Rawlings Hall (1958)

- Rawlings Hall
- Capacity: 364
- Rooms: 177

May A. Mann Jennings Hall (1961)

- Jennings Hall
- Capacity: 520
- Rooms: 248
- GatorWell at Jennings

Robert Calder Beaty Towers (1967)

- Beaty Towers
- Capacity: 787
- Rooms: 200

Infinity Hall (2015)

- Infinity Hall
- Capacity: 308
- Rooms: 92

=== West Campus Residence Halls ===
Tolbert Area

- North Hall (1950)
  - Capacity: 158
  - Rooms: 85
- Harold C. Riker Hall (1950)
  - Riker Hall
  - Capacity: 194
  - Rooms: 105
- Benjamin A. Tolbert Hall (1950)
  - Tolbert Hall
  - Capacity: 252
  - Rooms: 127
  - Faculty-in-Residence Community
- Rudolph Weaver Hall (1950)
  - Weaver Hall
  - Capacity: 171
  - Rooms: 98
  - International House at Weaver Hall
- East Hall (1961)
  - Capacity: 210
  - Rooms: 105
  - East Hall Engineering Community

Graham Area

- Klein H. Graham Hall (1961)
  - Graham Hall
  - Capacity: 218
  - Rooms: 105
  - Career Exploration Community
- Thomas M. Simpson Hall (1961)
  - Simpson Hall
  - Capacity: 225
  - Rooms: 109
- Harry R. Trusler Hall (1961)
  - Trusler Hall
  - Capacity: 208
  - Rooms: 104
  - Leader/Scholar Program

Keys Residential Complex (1991)

- Capacity: 419
- Rooms: 107

Springs Residential Complex (1995)

- Capacity: 476
- Rooms: 286
- GatorWell at the Springs

Lakeside Residential Complex (2000)

- Capacity: 528
- Rooms: 135
- Faculty-in-Residence Community

Hume Hall (2002)

- Capacity: 608
- Rooms: 322
- Honors Residential College

=== Honors Housing ===
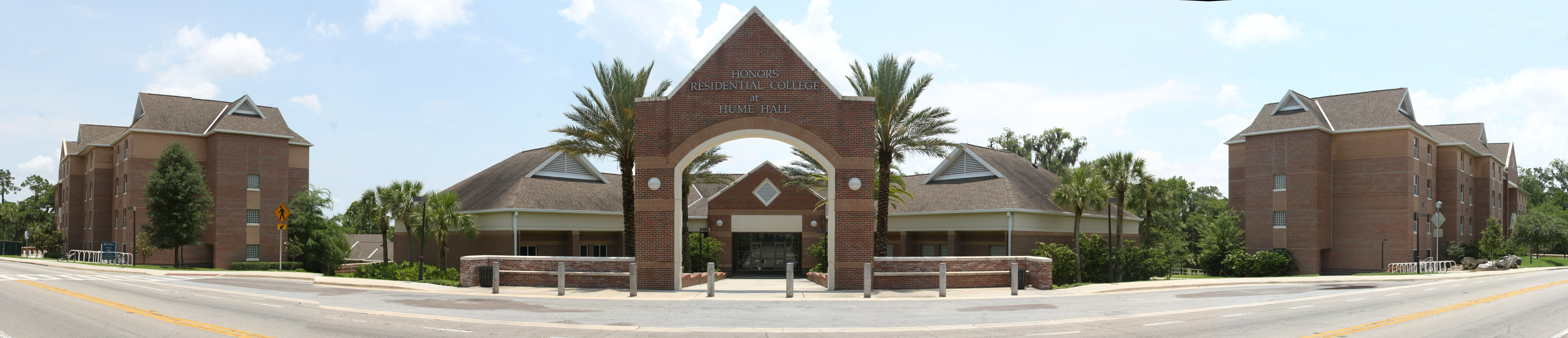
Honors Residential Housing at Hume Hall

The University of Florida Honors Program offers housing for freshmen at the Honors Village. This residentially-based academic community consists of five residence halls and integrates the housing needs of Honors residents with facilities, staff, and programs in support of the Honors Program.

In total 1,407 residents can be accommodated. With the facility, each building is "themed" to accommodate honors students including a "Mindfulness Community" with meditation spaces, a student library, a makers space, study spaces, and sound damped music rooms.

== Graduate and family housing ==
The graduate and family housing complexes are: Corry Village, Diamond Village, Maguire Village, Tanglewood Village, and University Village South ("UVS"). In addition they may reside in the UF affiliate The Continuum. Instead of renovating the 44 historic brick buildings, the University spent over $10,000,000 to tear down Maguire Village and University Village South in 2025 after years of controversy and a multi-year community campaign to save them from demolition, including an online Petition which garnered over 1800 signatures in opposition as of May 2025.

Dependent children residing in the student housing with their parents are assigned to schools in the Alachua County Public Schools. As of 2015, residents of Diamond Village, Maguire Village, Tanglewood Village, and University Village South are assigned to Idylwild Elementary School. Corry Village and The Continuum are in the zone for Finley Elementary School. Kanapaha Middle School and Gainesville High School are the assigned secondary schools for all of the properties except for Tanglewood Village, which is instead assigned to Lincoln Middle School and Eastside High School.

Graduate Students and their families living in Graduate and Family Housing are represented by the Mayors' Council, one of the establishing and charter member organizations of UF Student Government.

=== Village Apartments ===
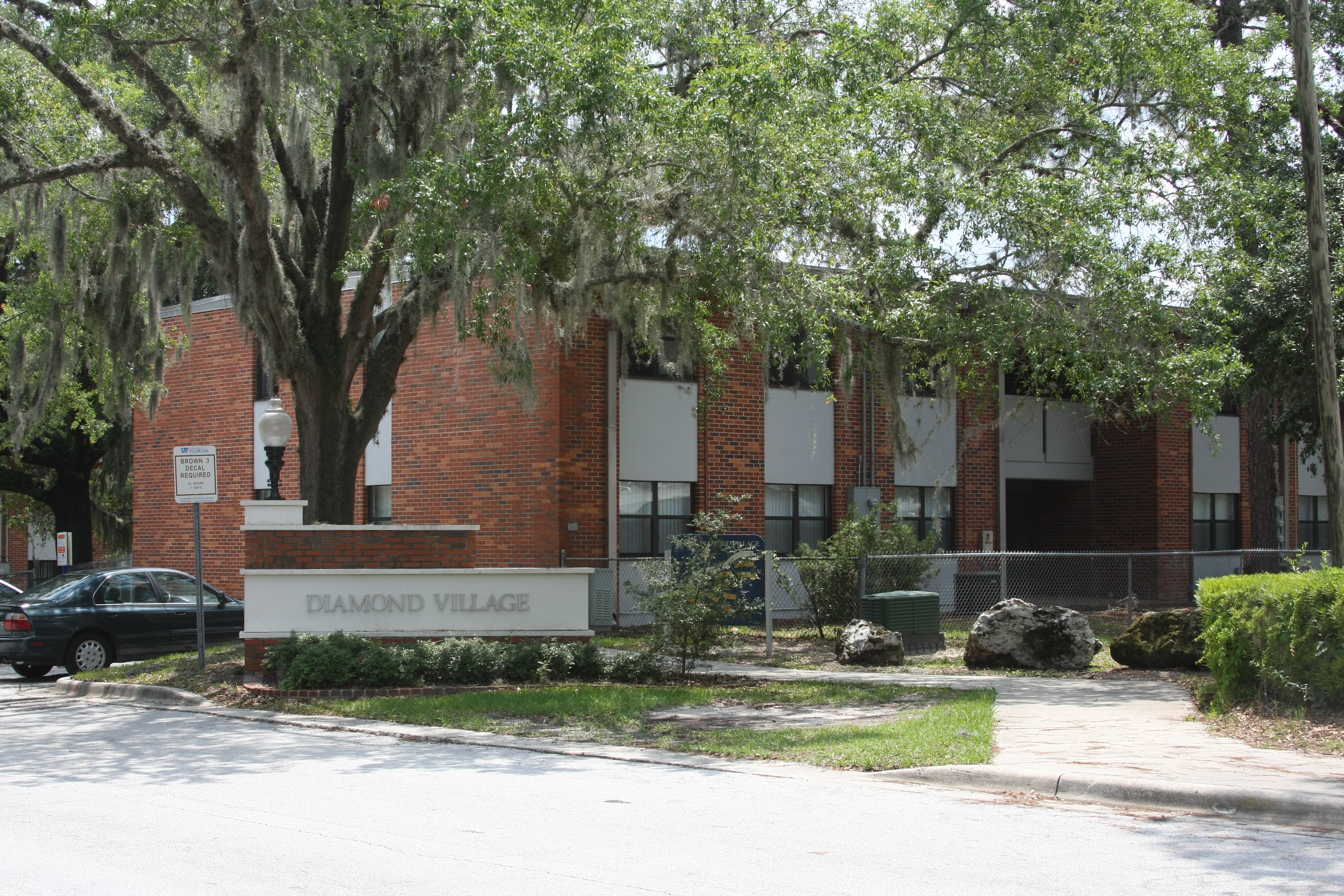
Diamond Village

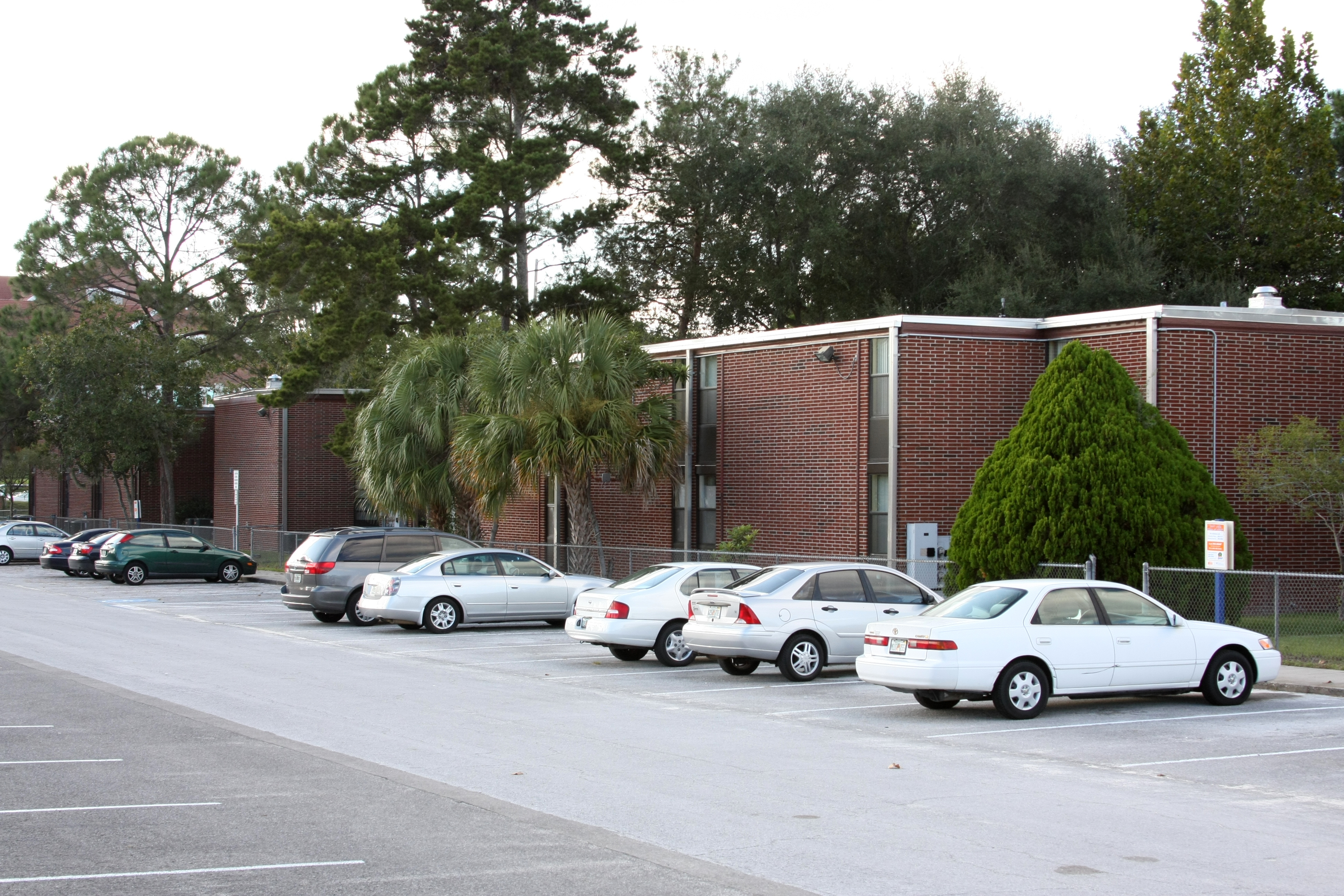
University Village

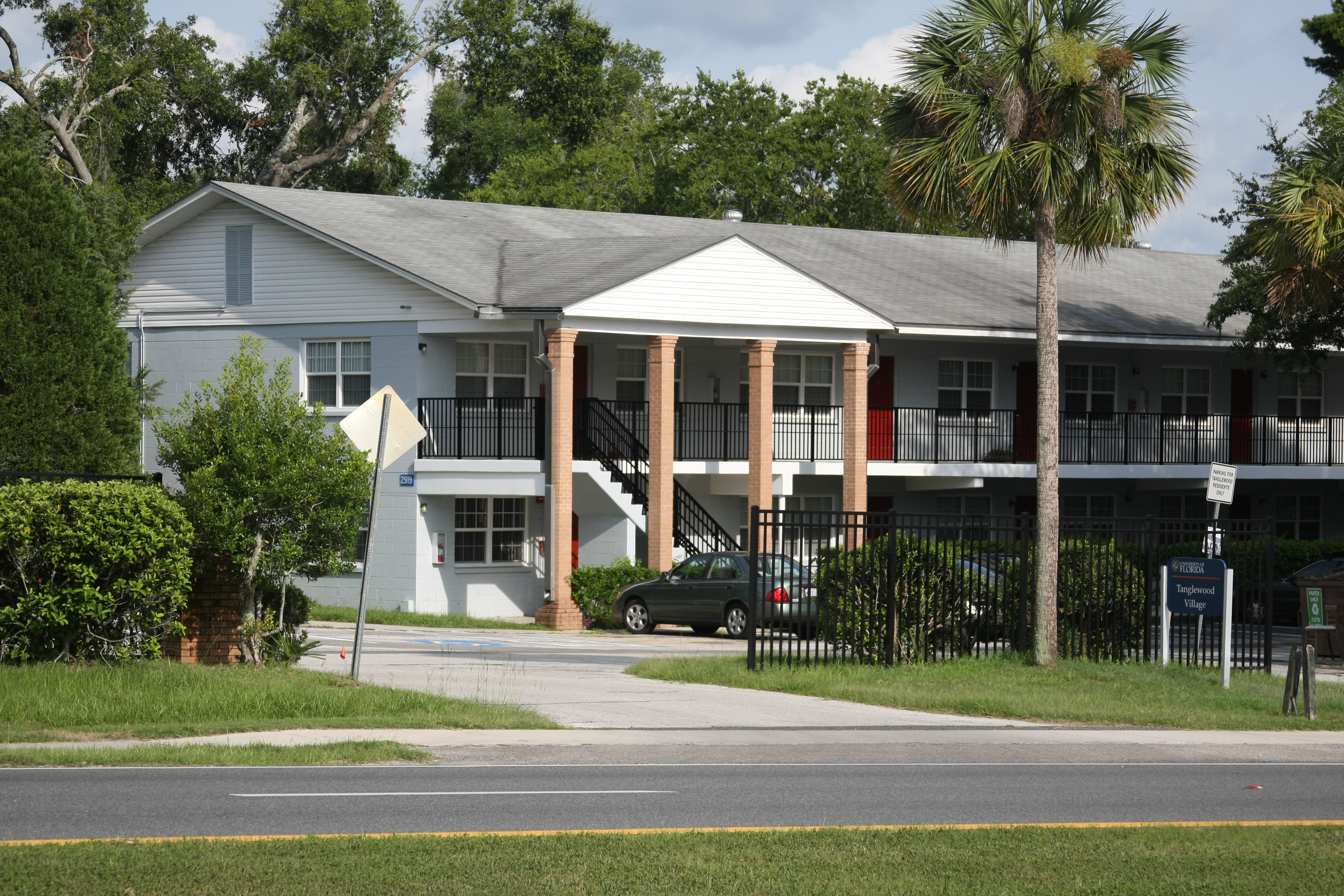
Tanglewood Village

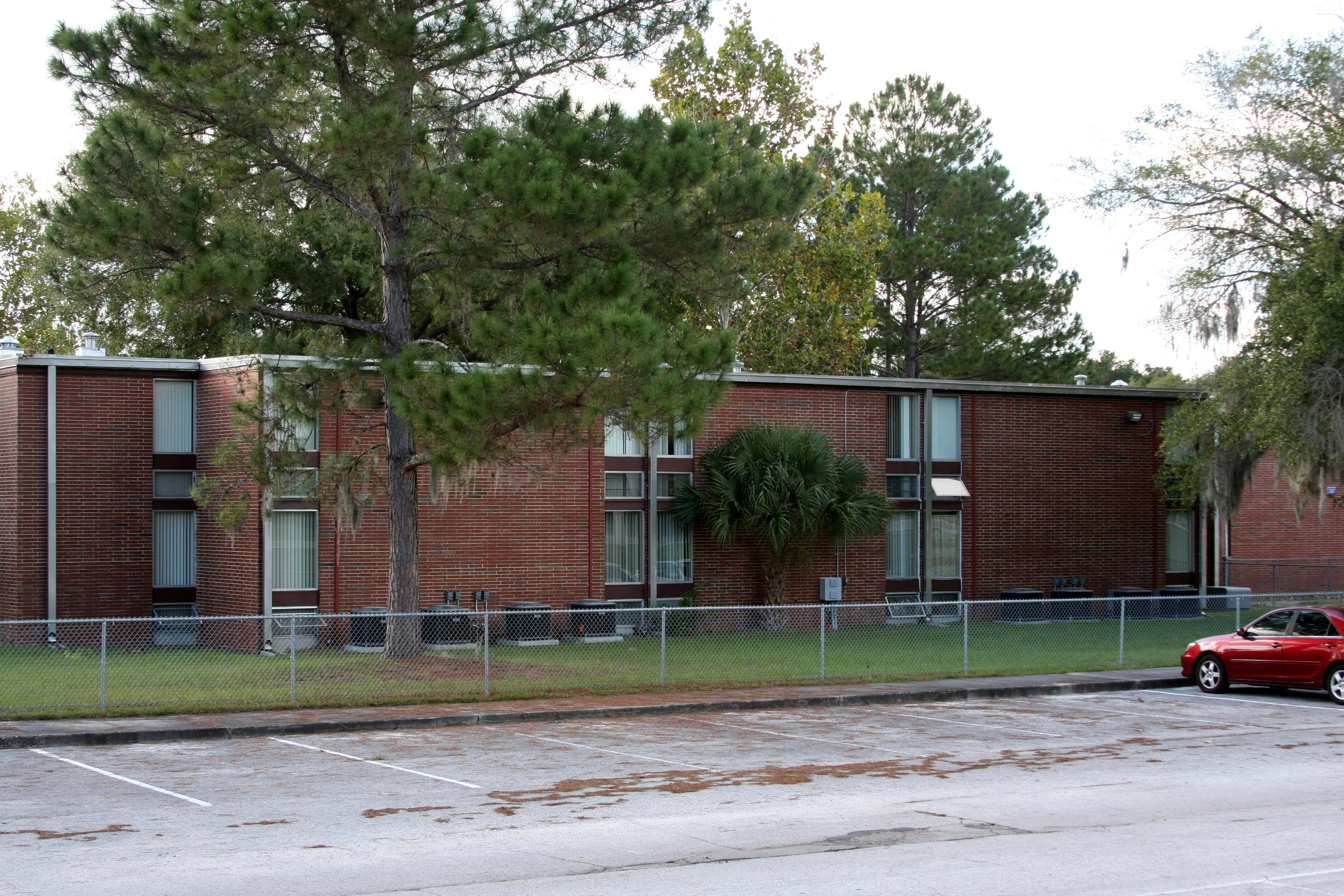
Maguire Village

Corry Memorial Village (1958)

- Corry Village
- Units:
  - 1 bedrooms — 100
  - 2 bedrooms — 108
  - 3 bedrooms — 8

Emory Gardner Diamond Memorial Village (1965)

- Diamond Village
- Units:
  - 1 bedrooms — 104
  - 2 bedrooms — 104

Raymer Francis Maguire Memorial Village (1971-2025)

- Maguire Village
- Units:
  - 1 bedrooms — 110
  - 2 bedrooms — 110

University Village South ("UVS") (1972-2025)

- Units:
  - 1 bedrooms — 64
  - 2 bedrooms — 64

Tanglewood Village (1973)

- Units:
  - 1 bedrooms — 89
  - 2 bedrooms — 81
  - 2 bedroom townhouses — 30
  - Efficiencies — 8

== Former facilities ==
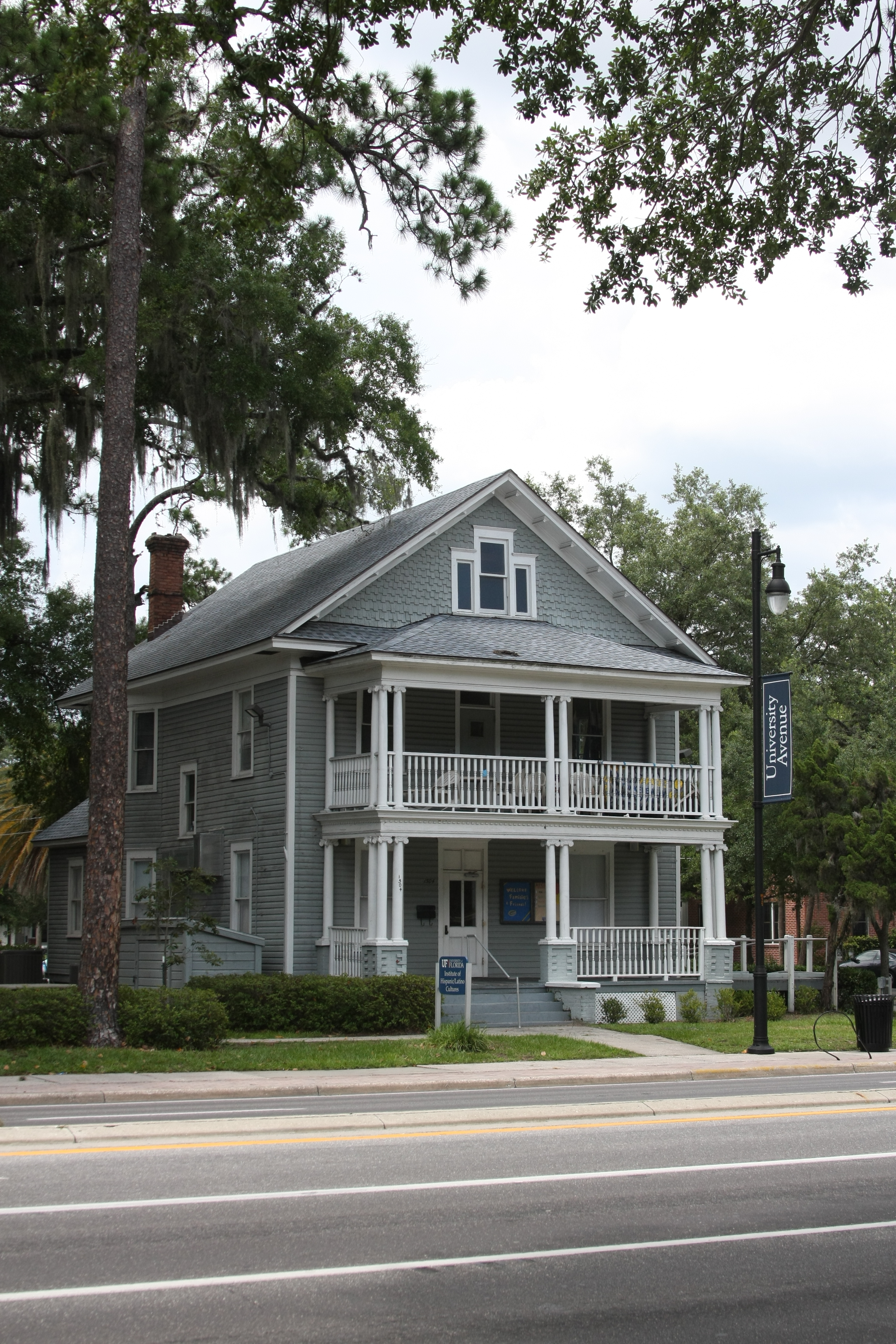
The building once known as The King's House was built in 1921 and was used to house the Institute of Hispanic/Latino Culture before being demolished in 2017.

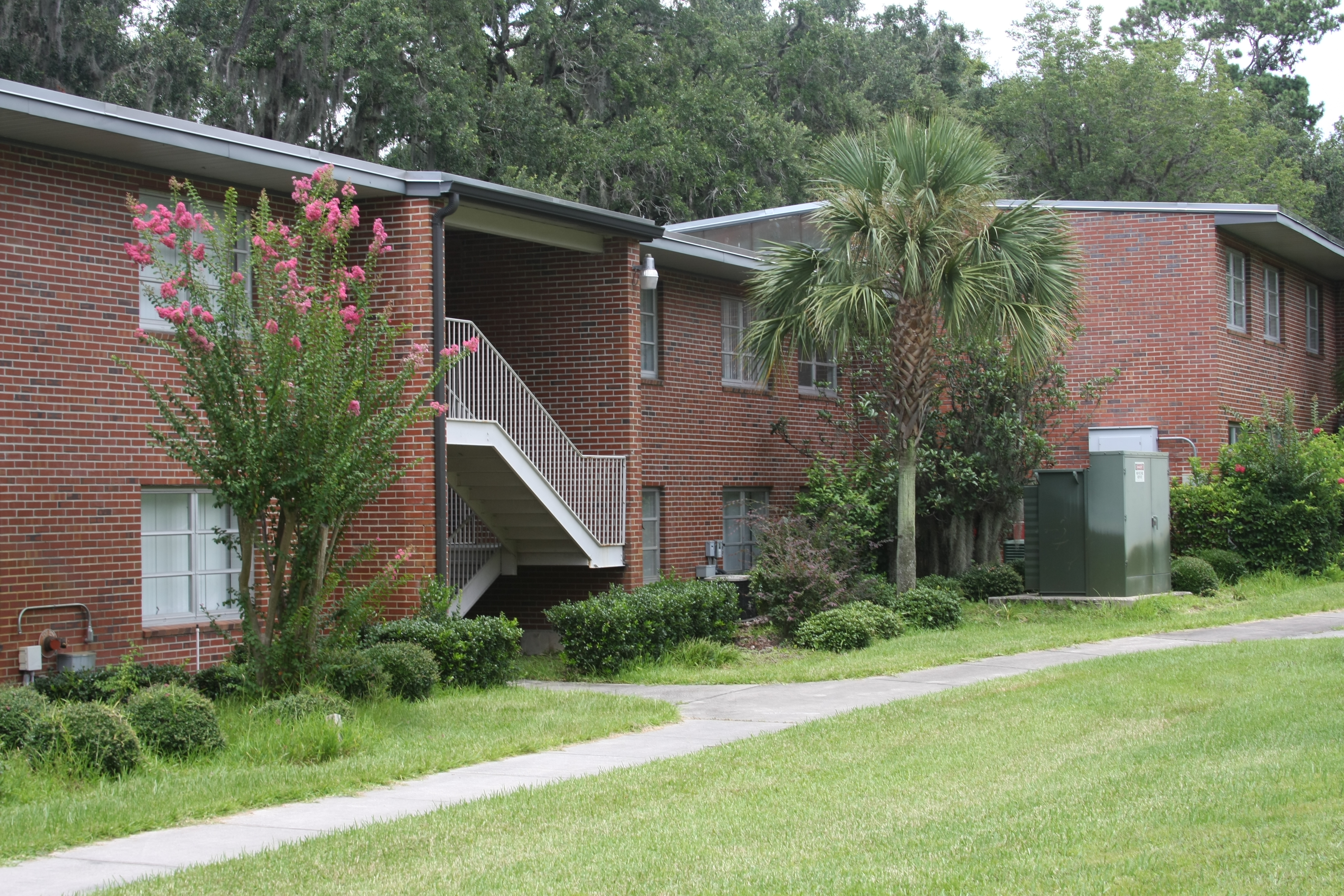
Building 271 is the only building that remains from Schuct Village. It is currently used by Shands to house transplant patients

There have been some buildings at the University of Florida that were used for housing, but have since been demolished or converted to other uses.

After rapid increases in enrollment after World War II and the allowing of women to enroll, several temporary buildings were erected on the campus. These included

- Flavets (1945–1974) - Named after a contraction of the term "Florida Veterans," these former military housing units were located at three locations on campus, including Flavet I near the current site of the J. Wayne Reitz Union, Flavet II at the current location of Beaty Towers, and Flavet III at the current location of the Keys Residential Complex.
- Temporary Frame Residence Halls (1946-1960s) - One story frame buildings built in several locations on campus, including the current site of the O'Connell Center and the current Computer Science and Engineering building.
- Grove Hall (1946–1977) - Reconstructed military building relocated from Camp Blanding located on the current site of the Architecture and Fine Arts colleges

Other facilities built after World War II included:

- The King’s House (1954–1967) - Two white framed buildings on University Avenue originally built in 1921 and used for experimental housing arrangements. The King's House was an unofficial name for Building 880, the eastern building. The buildings later housed the Institute of Black Culture and the Institute of Hispanic Culture before being demolished in 2017.
- Lonilair & Michael Halls, Pierce & Patrick Courts - Leased off-campus housing for women, located north of University Avenue near Anderson Hall and Library West
- Trailervet Village, Alachua Army Air Base, and Stengel Air Field - Temporary housing consisting of trailers and military barracks was located at the Alachua Army Air Base (now Gainesville Regional Airport) and Stengel Air Field (now Butler Plaza)
- Yon Hall (1966–1995) - Athlete housing located in the east side of the Ben Hill Griffin Stadium. When the NCAA ruled against athletic housing, the Springs Residential Complex was constructed and the facilities at the stadium were converted into offices for several university departments.
- Schucht Village (1959–1997) - Apartment buildings constructed for veterans and their families, and later graduate students and their families. The facility was located near Shands, and the complex was sold to Shands in 1997. Shands subsequently demolished all of the buildings except for Building 271, which was refurbished and is now used to house transplant patients.
- Hume Hall (1958–2000) - "Old Hume" was large multi-story residence hall located at the intersection of Gale Lemerand Drive (formerly North South Drive) and Museum Road. The building was demolished in 2000 to construct the current Honors Residential College at Hume Hall.

== See also ==
- University of Florida Campus Historic District
