= Pericle =

Pericle is a masculine given name of Romanic origin. Notable people with the name include:

- Pericle Fazzini (1913–1987), Italian painter and sculptor
- Pericle Felici (1911–1982), Italian prelate of the Catholic Church
- Pericle Martinescu (1911–2005), Romanian writer and journalist
- Pericle Pagliani (1883–1932), Italian long-distance runner
- Pericle Papahagi (1872–1943) Ottoman-born Romanian literary historian and folklorist

== See also ==
- Pericles (disambiguation)
