= Harold Hume =

American university professor and horticulturalist (1875–1965)

H. Harold Hume
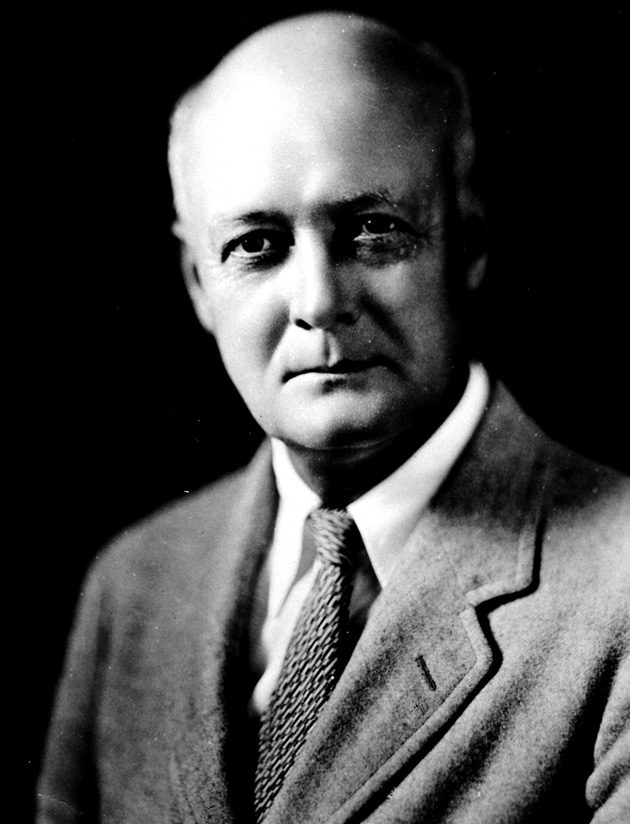
- University of Florida Provost for Agriculture; Harold Hume, circa 1943.
- Born: June 10, 1875; Russell, Ontario, Canada
- Died: October 10, 1965
- Education: Ontario Agricultural College; B.S., Iowa State College, 1899; M.S., Iowa State College, 1901
- Occupation(s): Horticulturalist; University Professor; University Administrator
- Employer(s): Florida Agricultural College; University of Florida

Hardrada Harold Hume (June 10, 1875 – October 10, 1965) was a Canadian-born American university professor, administrator and horticulturalist. Hume was a native of Ontario, and earned bachelor's and master's degrees before embarking on a career as a research botanist, horticulturalist and professor. After working as an academic administrator, Hume later served as the interim president of the University of Florida, serving during September 1947.

== Early life and education ==
Hume was born and raised in Russell, Ontario, Canada. He attended Ontario Agricultural College in Guelph, Ontario, and graduated from Iowa State College in Ames, Iowa, where he earned his Bachelor of Science and Master of Science degrees in 1899 and 1901, respectively. In 1900 he distributed an exsiccata-like series called Fungi of Florida.

== Botanist, professor, administrator ==
In 1904, Hume moved south again, accepting work as a professor of botany and horticulture at the Florida Agricultural College in Lake City, Florida, one of the University of Florida's four predecessor institutions, and thereafter held the same position at the modern University of Florida in Gainesville, Florida. During his time as a professor, Hume also served as the horticulturalist and botanist with the university-affiliated Florida Agricultural Experiment Station. He was a published author and recognized expert on the cultivation of citrus fruits and pecans. Hume left the Florida Experiment Station after five years to accept a similar position with the North Carolina Agricultural Experiment Station in Raleigh, North Carolina.

Hume returned to Florida to accept a position as the general manager of the Glen St. Mary Nurseries Company, a leading grower of citrus trees. He remained with the company from 1917 to 1929, later serving as the company's president and then the chairman of its board of directors. Hume continued to write and publish articles during this time, notably including The Cultivation of Citrus Fruits (1926), which became a standard reference in the field.

He rejoined the faculty of the University of Florida in Gainesville, Florida in 1930, was appointed dean of the College of Agriculture in 1938, and became the provost for agriculture in 1943. During the early 1930s, He was one of the key researchers working on methods to eradicate the Mediterranean fruit fly infestation that was threatening Florida's citrus industry.

Hume was appointed the university's interim president when president John J. Tigert resigned in 1947, and he continued to serve as the dean of the College of Agriculture at the same time. He was known for spending ten hours a day in his office, keeping up with his duties as president as well as dean of the agriculture college. Hume enjoyed spending his lunch hours talking with faculty members and students alike.

After his permanent successor, J. Hillis Miller, was selected in 1947, Hume continued his work in agriculture, and was later named chairman of the administrative committee of the Inter-American Institute of Agricultural Sciences. Clemson University awarded him an honorary doctor of science degree in recognition of his achievements in agricultural science.

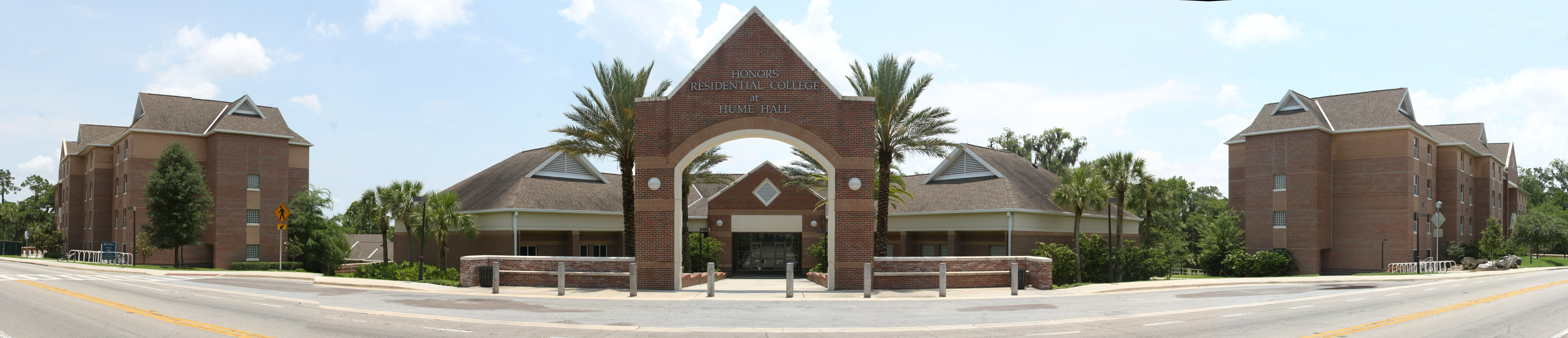
Panoramic view of Hume Hall, the undergraduate honors residential college of the University of Florida in Gainesville, Florida.

== Legacy ==
Hume retired from the University of Florida faculty on June 30, 1949, but he continued to write and publish major books and journal articles on his favorite horticulture topics, including citrus fruits, azaleas and camellias. Hume died four months following his ninetieth birthday, on October 10, 1965, and was affectionately eulogized by his colleagues as the "Grand Old Man of Agriculture."

In recognition of his long service to the University of Florida, Hume Hall, one of the university's student residence hall complexes was named for him. The original Hume Hall was later razed to make room for the new Honors Residential College at Hume Hall, which was completed and opened for use in 2002.

== See also ==
- Florida Gators
- History of Florida
- History of the University of Florida
- Land-grant university
- List of Iowa State University people
- List of University of Florida faculty and administrators
- List of University of Florida presidents

== Bibliography ==
- Hume, H. Harold, Azaleas and Camellias, MacMillan Publishing Company, Inc., New York, New York (rev ed. 1962).
- Hume, H. Harold, Azaleas: Kinds and Culture, J. Horace McFarland Company, Harrisburg, Pennsylvania (1948).
- Hume, H. Harold, Camellias in America, J. Horace McFarland Company, Harrisburg, Pennsylvania (1st ed. 1946).
- Hume, H. Harold, Camellias: Kinds and Culture, The MacMillan Company, New York, New York (1951).
- Hume, H. Harold, Citrus Fruits, The MacMillan Company, New York, New York (1957).
- Hume, H. Harold, Citrus Fruits and Their Culture, Orange Judd Company, New York, New York (5th ed. 1913).
- Hume, H. Harold, The Cultivation of Citrus Fruits, The MacMillan Company, New York, New York (1926).
- Hume, H. Harold, Gardening in the Lower South, The MacMillan Company, New York, New York (1929).
- Hume, H. Harold, Hollies, The MacMillan Company, New York, New York (1st ed. 1953).
- Hume, H. Harold, The Pecan and Its Culture, Mt. Pleasant Press, Harrisburg, Pennsylvania (2nd ed. 1910).
- Pleasants, Julian M., Gator Tales: An Oral History of the University of Florida, University of Florida, Gainesville, Florida (2006). ISBN 0-8130-3054-4.
- Proctor, Samuel, & Wright Langley, Gator History: A Pictorial History of the University of Florida, South Star Publishing Company, Gainesville, Florida (1986). ISBN 0-938637-00-2.
- Van Ness, Carl, & Kevin McCarthy, Honoring the Past, Shaping the Future: The University of Florida, 1853–2003, University of Florida, Gainesville, Florida (2003).
