= 1932 United States Senate election in Florida =

- November 8, 1932
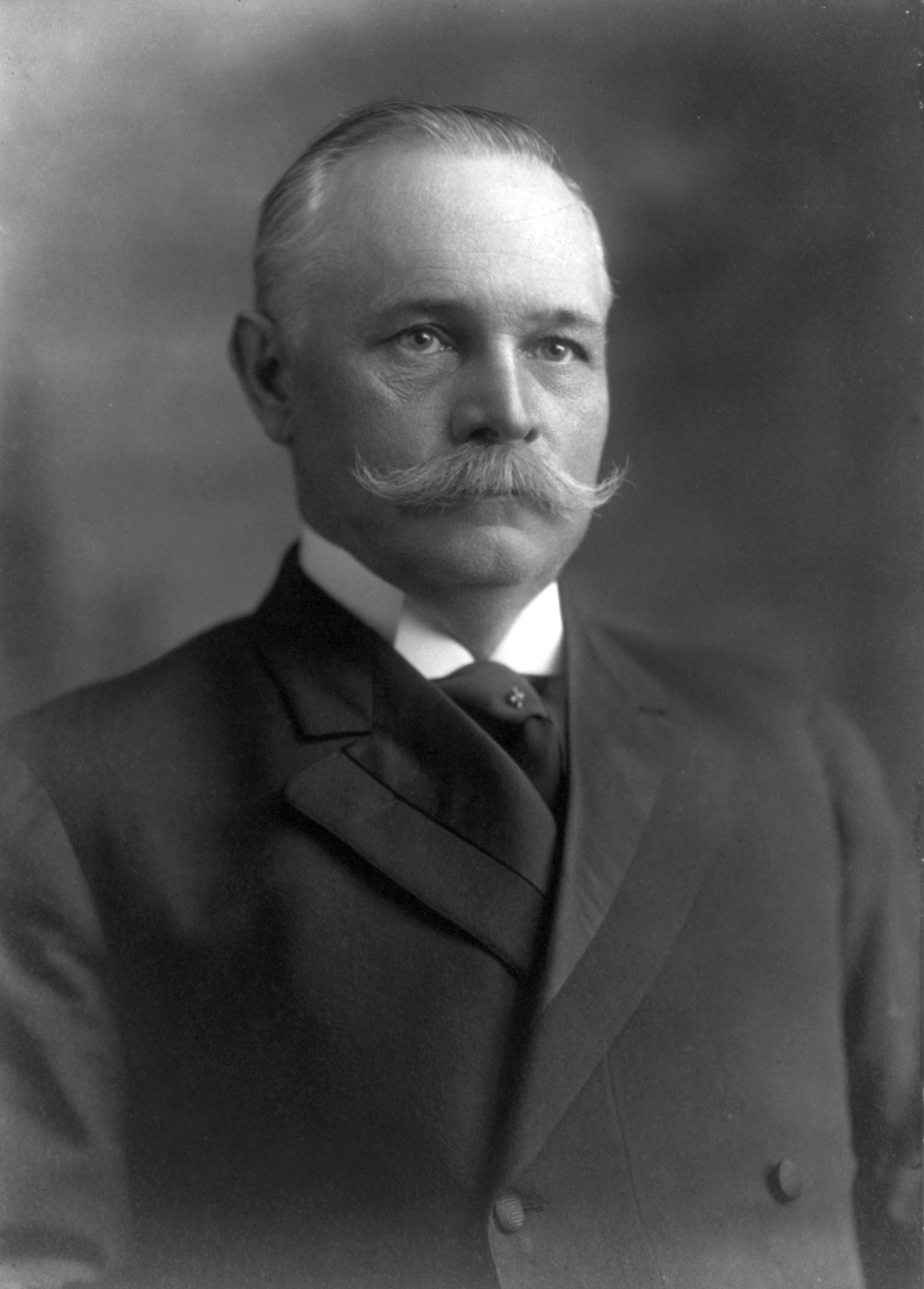
Nominee	Duncan U. Fletcher
Party	Democratic
Popular vote	204,651
Percentage	100.00%
- County results Fletcher: 90–100%
U.S. senator before election
Duncan U. Fletcher
Democratic
Elected U.S. Senator
Duncan U. Fletcher
Democratic

The 1932 United States Senate election in Florida was held on November 8, 1932. Incumbent Democratic U.S. Senator Duncan U. Fletcher won re-election to a fifth term.

Fletcher's victory in the June 7 primary was tantamount to election, as the Republican Party did not field a candidate for this election.

== Democratic primary ==
=== Candidates ===
- Duncan U. Fletcher, incumbent U.S. Senator

=== Results ===
Democratic Party primary results
Party	Candidate	Votes	%
Democratic	Duncan U. Fletcher (incumbent)	unopposed	

== General election ==
=== Results ===
United States Senate election in Florida, 1932
Party	Candidate	Votes	%	±%
Democratic	Duncan U. Fletcher	204,651	100.00%	
Total votes		204,651	100.00%	
Democratic hold				

== See also ==
- 1932 United States Senate elections

== Bibliography ==
- Guide to U.S. Elections. Vol. II. Washington, DC: CQ Press. 2005. ISBN 1-56802-981-0.
