= Hume Hall =

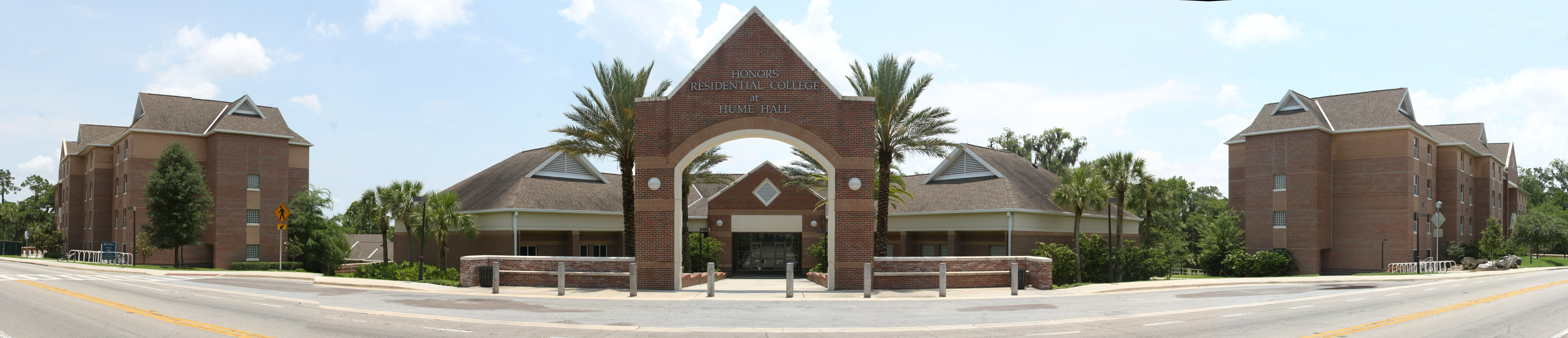
- Honors Residential College at Hume Hall
- Interactive map of the Hume Hall area

General information
- Type: Housing
- Location: Main campus, University of Florida, Gainesville, Florida, United States
- Coordinates: 29.6449555°N 82.3522077°W
- Named for: Harold Hume
- Completed: 2002
- Cost: $18.1 million

Design and construction
- Architects: Ponikvar & Assoc.

Website
- Dorm Info

Hume Hall, built in 2002, is the former Honors Residential College of the University of Florida, located on the western side of the university's Gainesville, Florida campus.

The current structure is the second at the university to bear the name. The original Hume Hall was designed by Guy Fulton and built on the same site in 1958 as a conventional dormitory. It was demolished in 2000 to allow for construction of the current facility.

Hume Hall can be accommodate 608 residents, and is located in the heart of the University of Florida campus. The facility has a commons building, a number of multimedia-capable classrooms, faculty offices with an on-site academic advisors, a large activity room, and an information desk.

Hume Hall is named for Harold Hume, dean of the College of Agriculture, provost, and interim president of the university.

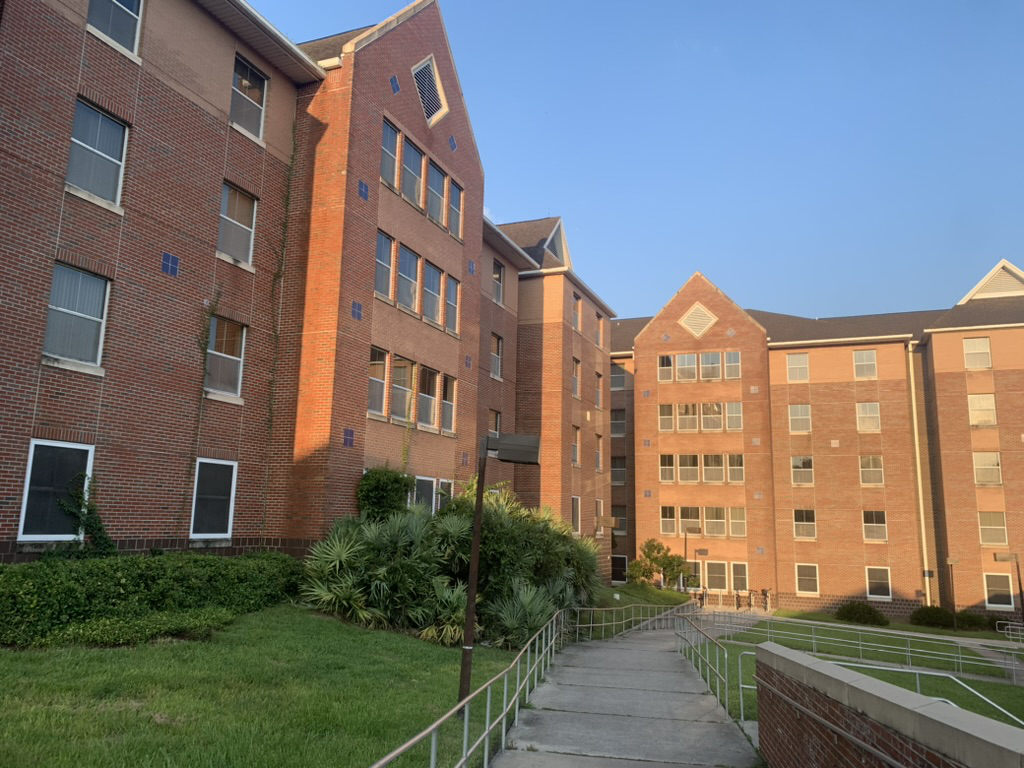
Photograph of Hume Hall East from the back

== Hume Area Council ==
Hume Area Council (abbreviated as HAC) is a student organization that represents residents of the area to the Inter-Residence Hall Association and the University of Florida Department of Housing and Residence Life. The organization is one of 11 area governments (abbreviated as AGs) that represent individual areas of residence halls.

Representing Hume's spot as residence halls for University of Florida honors students, HAC was previously called the Students Honors Organization (abbreviated as SHO). SHO operated both as an area government and as a function of the honors system at the university in its own right.

== See also ==
- List of University of Florida buildings
- List of University of Florida presidents
- University of Florida student housing
