= Fletcher Hall =

- U.S. Historic district – Contributing property
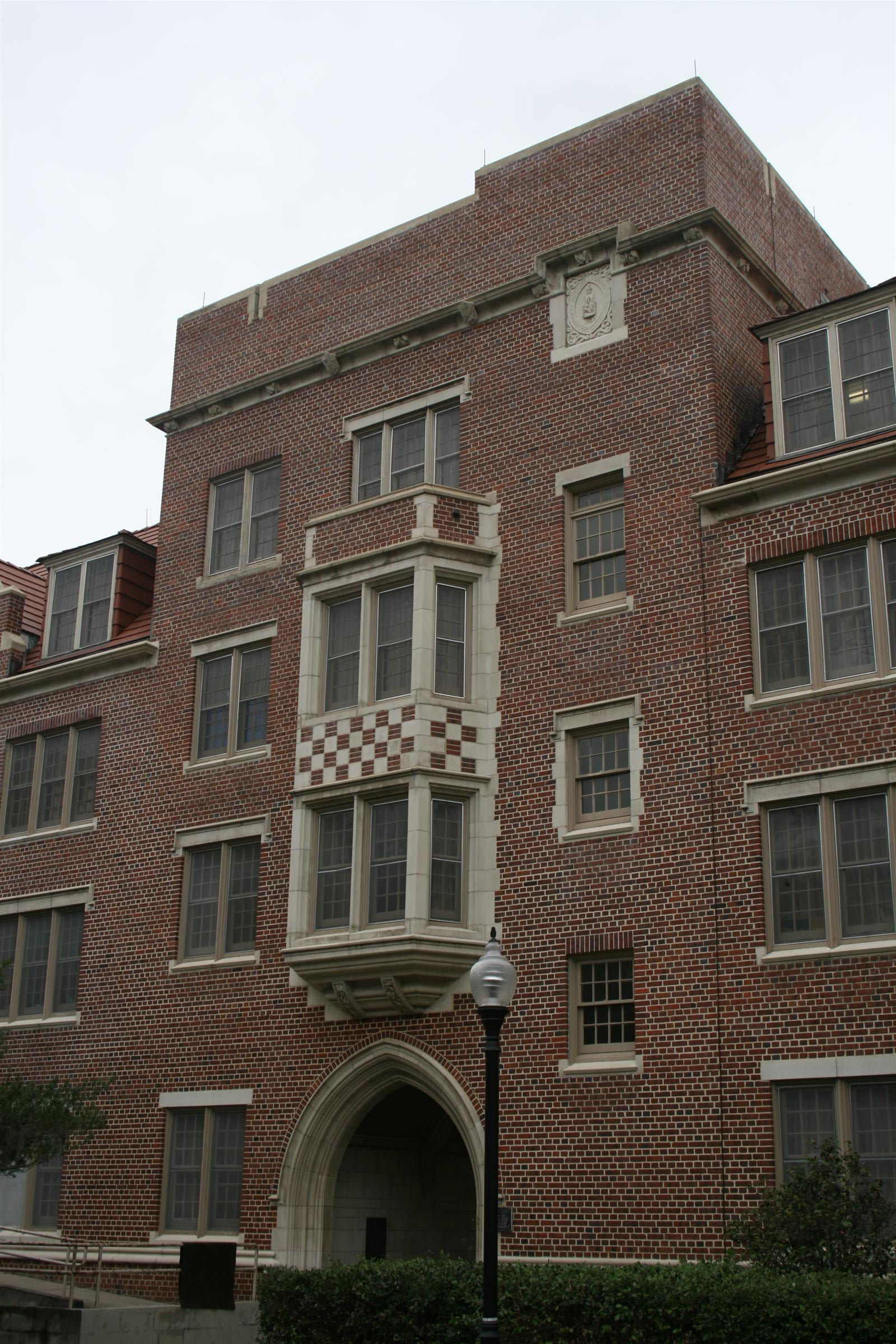
- Location: Gainesville, Florida, United States
- Coordinates: 29°39′4″N 82°20′43″W
- Built: 1938

Fletcher Hall, originally called North Hall, is a historic dormitory building on the campus of the University of Florida in Gainesville, Florida, United States. It makes up half of the "F" in the "U.F." in the Murphee Area. The "U.F" in the building design can be seen from an aerial view. It was designed by Rudolph Weaver in the Collegiate Gothic style, was built in 1938 and was named for Duncan U. Fletcher, longtime U.S. Senator from Florida. It was renovated in 1984.

Fletcher Hall is a contributing property in the University of Florida Campus Historic District which was added to the National Register of Historic Places on April 20, 1989.

Fletcher Hall was the location of the founding of the predecessor to the Inter-Residence Hall Association, a large organization on campus that represents residents of student housing.

== See also ==
- University of Florida
- Buildings at the University of Florida
- University of Florida student housing
- Campus Historic District
