= SS Duncan U. Fletcher =

Liberty ship of WWII

History

United States
- Name: Duncan U. Fletcher
- Namesake: Duncan U. Fletcher
- Owner: War Shipping Administration (WSA)
- Operator: Lykes Bros. Steamship Co. Inc.
- Ordered: as type (EC2-S-C1) hull, MC hull 1529
- Builder: J.A. Jones Construction, Panama City, Florida
- Cost: $1,807,972
- Yard number: 11
- Way number: 5
- Laid down: 3 May 1943
- Launched: 10 August 1943
- Completed: 27 August 1943
- Identification: Call Signal: KXLM
- Fate: Sold for commercial use, 3 March 1947

Greece
- Name: Pericles
- Namesake: Pericles
- Acquired: 3 March 1947
- Fate: Scrapped, 1966

General characteristics
- Class & type: Liberty ship; type EC2-S-C1, standard
- Tonnage: 10,865 LT DWT; 7,176 GRT
- Displacement: 3,380 long tons (3,434 t) (light); 14,245 long tons (14,474 t) (max)
- Length: 441 feet 6 inches (135 m) oa; 416 feet (127 m) pp; 427 feet (130 m) lwl
- Beam: 57 feet (17 m)
- Draft: 27 ft 9.25 in (8.4646 m)
- Installed power: 2 × Oil fired 450 °F (232 °C) boilers, operating at 220 psi (1,500 kPa); 2,500 hp (1,900 kW)
- Propulsion: 1 × triple-expansion steam engine, (manufactured by Vulcan Iron Works, Wilkes-Barre, Pennsylvania); 1 × screw propeller
- Speed: 11.5 knots (21.3 km/h; 13.2 mph)
- Capacity: 562,608 cubic feet (15,931 m^{3}) (grain); 499,573 cubic feet (14,146 m^{3}) (bale)
- Complement: 38–62 USMM; 21–40 USNAG
- Armament: Varied by ship; Bow-mounted 3-inch (76 mm)/50-caliber gun; Stern-mounted 4-inch (102 mm)/50-caliber gun; 2–8 × single 20-millimeter (0.79 in) Oerlikon anti-aircraft (AA) cannons and/or, 2–8 × 37-millimeter (1.46 in) M1 AA guns

SS Duncan U. Fletcher was a Liberty ship built in the United States during World War II. She was named after Duncan U. Fletcher, the 21st and 25th Mayor of Jacksonville, Florida, and later the longest serving United States Senator in Florida's history.

== Construction ==
Duncan U. Fletcher was laid down on 3 May 1943, under a United States Maritime Commission (MARCOM) contract, MC hull 1529, by J.A. Jones Construction, Panama City, Florida; she was launched on 10 August 1943.

== History ==
She was allocated to Lykes Brothers Steamship Company, on 27 August 1943. On 23 April 1946, she was laid up in the National Defense Reserve Fleet, in the James River Group, Lee Hall, Virginia. On 3 April 1947, she was sold for $544,506 to Ionian Steamship Co., Ltd., for commercial use and renamed Pericles. She was scrapped in 1966.

== Bibliography ==
- "Jones Construction, Panama City FL". ShipbuildingHistory.com. 13 October 2010.
- Maritime Administration. "Duncan U. Fletcher". Ship History Database Vessel Status Card. U.S. Department of Transportation, Maritime Administration.
- Davies, James (May 2004). "Specifications (As-Built)" (PDF). p. 23.
- "SS Duncan U. Fletcher".
