= Perikles (name) =

Perikles or Pericles or Periklis (Greek: Περικλής) is a Greek masculine given name.

Notable people with the given name include

== Ancient world ==
- Pericles (circa 495-429 BC), Athenian statesman, orator and general
  - Pericles the Younger (440s–406 BCE), Athenian general, illegitimate son of the above
- Pericles, Dynast of Lycia (circa 380-360 BC), Dynast of Lycia

== Modern world ==
- Periklis Bousinakis, Greek footballer
- Periklis Dorkofikis, Greek basketball player
- Periklis Hristoforidis, Greek film actor
- Perikles Ioannidis (1881-1965), Greek admiral
- Perikles Kakousis (1879-1939), Greek weightlifter
- Perikles Pierrakos-Mavromichalis, 19th century Greek fencer
- Periklis Panagopoulos, Greek shipping magnate
- Périclès Pantazis, Greek impressionist painter
- Periklis Papapostolou, Greek footballer
- Pericles A. Sakellarios (1905-1985), Greek architect
- Péricles (cartoonist) (1924-1961), full name Péricles de Andrade Maranhão, Brazilian cartoonist
- Periklis Iakovakis, Greek hurdler
- Péricles (singer) (born 1969), full name Péricles Aparecido Fonseca da Faria, Brazilian singer and instrumentalist
- Pericles (footballer, born 1975), full name Pericles de Oliveira Ramos, Brazilian football defender
- Pericles (footballer, born 1989), full name Junior Pericles Pinto Catarina, Brazilian football attacking midfielder
- Péricles (footballer, born 1994), full name Péricles da Silva Nunes, Brazilian football defensive midfielder
