= Duncan U. Fletcher =

American politician (1859–1936)

Duncan Upshaw Fletcher
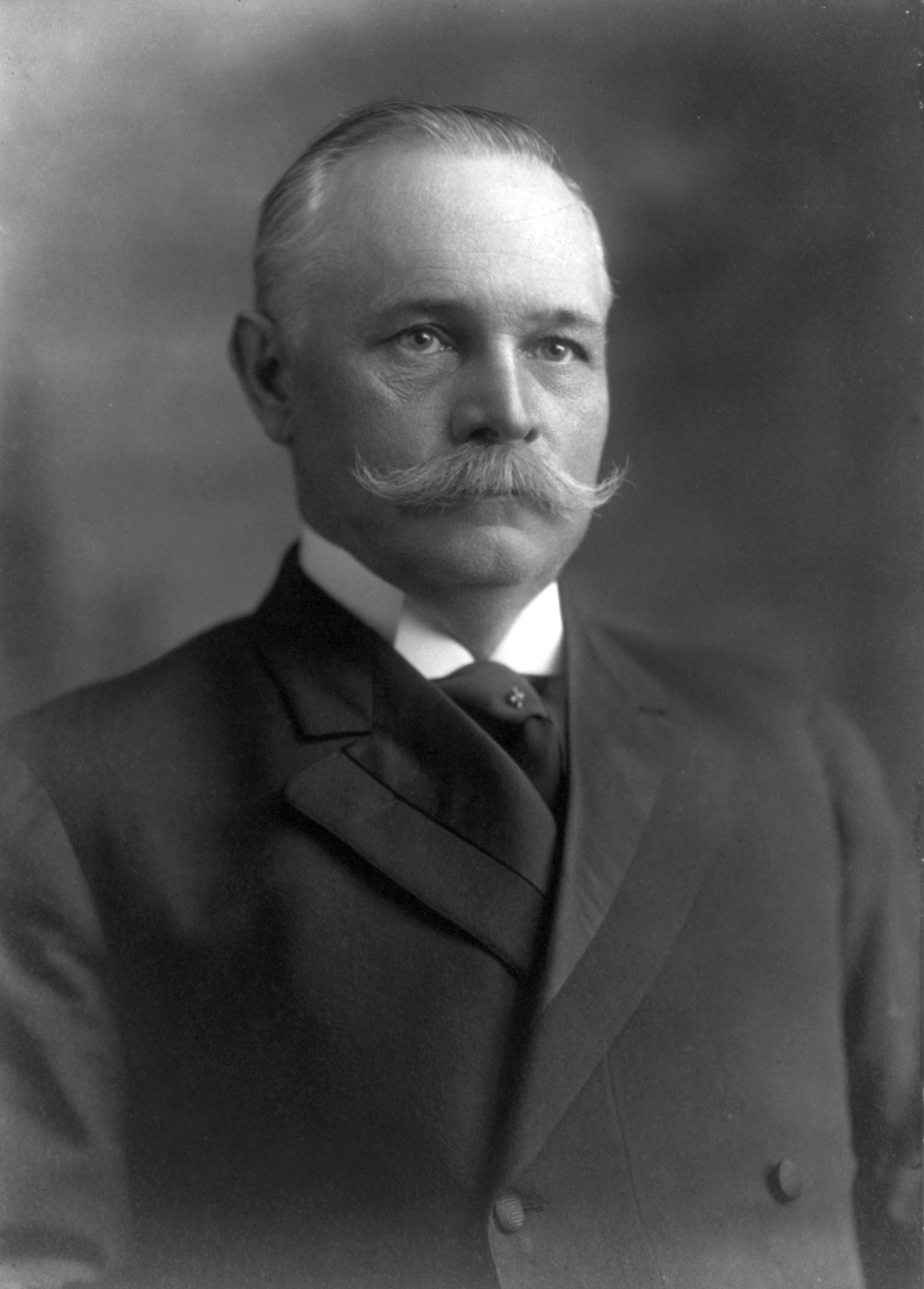
- Fletcher in 1910

United States Senator from Florida
- In office March 4, 1909 – June 17, 1936
- Preceded by: William Hall Milton
- Succeeded by: William Luther Hill

21st & 25th Mayor of Jacksonville
- In office 1893–1895
- Preceded by: Henry Robinson
- Succeeded by: William M. Bostwick
- In office 1901–1903
- Preceded by: J. E. T. Bowden
- Succeeded by: George M. Nolan

Personal details
- Born: January 6, 1859 Americus, Georgia, U.S.
- Died: June 17, 1936 (aged 77) Washington, D.C., U.S.
- Party: Democratic
- Spouse: Anna Louis Paine
- Education: Vanderbilt University
- Profession: Lawyer

Duncan Upshaw Fletcher (January 6, 1859 – June 17, 1936) was an American lawyer and politician of the Democratic Party who served in the U.S. Senate and as mayor of Jacksonville, Florida. Fletcher was the longest-serving U.S. Senator in Florida's history. He served two terms as Mayor of Jacksonville and served in the Florida House of Representatives.

== Early life and career ==
Born near Americus, Georgia, Fletcher studied law at Vanderbilt University in Nashville, Tennessee. He graduated in 1880 and was admitted to the bar the following year. He set up a law practice in the city of Jacksonville, Florida. He was a founding member of the Jacksonville Bar Association and its first president. He was an early investor in 1,300 acres (5.3 km^{2}) in the area now called Fort Lauderdale, more specifically Wilton Manors, to start the company known then as Florida Fiber, a sisal hemp farming operation. He was general counsel for several railroads, including the Florida East Coast Railroad, which was operated by Henry Flagler, formerly president of Standard Oil.

In 1896, Fletcher was one of three attorneys, all white, appointed to administer the bar examination to James Weldon Johnson, who, in addition to his many other accomplishments, was the first African American admitted to the Florida Bar by examination. Over the objection of another examiner, Fletcher motioned that Weldon Johnson be admitted, and congratulated him.

In February 1897, Fletcher was founding President of the Jacksonville Bar Association.

== Political career ==
Fletcher became active in municipal politics and was elected to the city council in 1887 and served as Mayor of Jacksonville from 1893 to 1895 and from 1901 to 1903. He rebuilt Jacksonville after the devastating Great Fire of 1901. In 1893, he was elected to the Florida House of Representatives. From 1900 to 1907, Fletcher chaired the Board of Public Instruction of Duval County. In 1908, he served as president of the Gulf Coast Inland Waterways Association and later, the Mississippi to Atlantic Waterway Association.

== Senate career ==
In 1909, the Florida Legislature elected Fletcher, a Democrat, to the United States Senate, where he served and was re-elected for four consecutive terms. In 1913, President Woodrow Wilson appointed him chairman of the United States commission to investigate European land-mortgage banks, cooperative rural credit unions, and the betterment of rural conditions in Europe. President Wilson also appointed Fletcher as a delegate to the International High Commission. Senator Fletcher served on a number of government committees, including the United States Senate Committee on Commerce, where he was chairman from 1916 to 1919, the Committee on Commerce subcommittee investigating the Titanic disaster, the high-profile chairmanship of the United States Senate Senate Banking and Currency Committee in 1932, with a mandate to examine the causes of the Wall Street Crash of 1929. His committee, generally known as the Pecora Commission, began a major process of reform of the American financial system and resulted in the passage of the Securities Act of 1933 and the Securities Exchange Act of 1934 that instituted disclosure laws for corporations seeking public financing plus the 1935 formation of the U.S. Securities and Exchange Commission as a mechanism to enforce the provisions of the new Acts. In 1928, Senator Fletcher introduced legislation to create the Everglades National Park, which was signed into law by President Franklin D. Roosevelt in 1934. Senator Fletcher also was responsible for locating funding for Tampa's Gandy Bridge and founded property for McDill Air Force Base among many of the WPA projects of the time.

Fletcher died of a heart attack in Washington, D.C., and was interred in the Evergreen Cemetery in Jacksonville. His secretary destroyed his personal papers after his death.

Senator Fletcher was a trustee of John B. Stetson University and of St. Luke's Hospital Association at Jacksonville. He was vice president of the Children's Home Society of Florida and honorary president of the Southern Commercial Congress. He also was a member of the American Bar Association and the Florida State Bar Association and president of the Florida Society. In 1907, Senator Fletcher founded the First Unitarian Church in Jacksonville, Florida.

== Views ==
Fletcher was a staunch supporter of the Confederate cause. In 1931 he delivered a speech to the United Daughters of the Confederacy: "The South fought to preserve race integrity. Did we lose that? We fought to maintain free white dominion. Did we lose that? The States are in control of the people. Local self-government, democratic government, obtains. That was not lost. The rights of the sovereign States, under the Constitution, are recognized. We did not lose that. I submit that what is called “the Lost Cause” was not so much “lost” as is sometimes supposed."

== Honors ==
- Duncan U. Fletcher High School in Neptune Beach, Florida
- Duncan U. Fletcher Middle School in Jacksonville Beach
- Phi Alpha Delta Fletcher Chapter at UF Law
- Duncan U. Fletcher Hall at the University of Florida
- During World War II the Liberty ship SS Duncan U. Fletcher was built in Panama City, Florida, and named in his honor.
- Fletcher Ave. in Tampa, Florida

== United States Senate Elections ==
Florida United States Senate election, 1908

- Duncan U. Fletcher (D) was nominated for the United States Senate in a primary election on June 16, 1908, and elected by the legislature in its next convening.

Florida United States Senate election, 1914:

- Duncan U. Fletcher (D) (inc.) – (99.5%)

Florida United States Senate election, 1920

- Duncan U. Fletcher (D) (inc.) – (69.5%)
- John M. Cheney (R) – (26.0%)
- M.J. Martin (Soc.) – (2.5%)
- G. A. Klock (R-White) – (2.0%)

Florida United States Senate election, 1926

- Duncan U. Fletcher (D) (inc.) – (77.9%)
- John M. Lindsay (I) – (12.8%)

Florida United States Senate election, 1932

- Duncan U. Fletcher (D) (inc.) – (99.8%)

== Portrayals ==
- Benno Sterzenbach (1984) - Titanic - Nachspiel einer Katastrophe (German TV film)
- Steve Herforth (2024) - Unsinkable (film)

== See also ==
- List of members of the United States Congress who died in office (1900–1949)

== Notes ==
Party political offices
First	Democratic nominee for U.S. Senator from Florida (Class 3); 1914, 1920, 1926, 1932	Succeeded by Claude Pepper
U.S. Senate
Preceded by William Hall Milton	United States Senator (Class 3) from Florida; 1909–1936	Succeeded by William Luther Hill
Political offices
Preceded by Henry Robinson	Mayor of Jacksonville; 1893–1895	Succeeded by William M. Bostwick
Preceded by J. E. T. Bowden	Mayor of Jacksonville; 1901–1903	Succeeded by George M. Nolan
