= Ustler Hall =

- Women's Gymnasium
- U.S. National Register of Historic Places
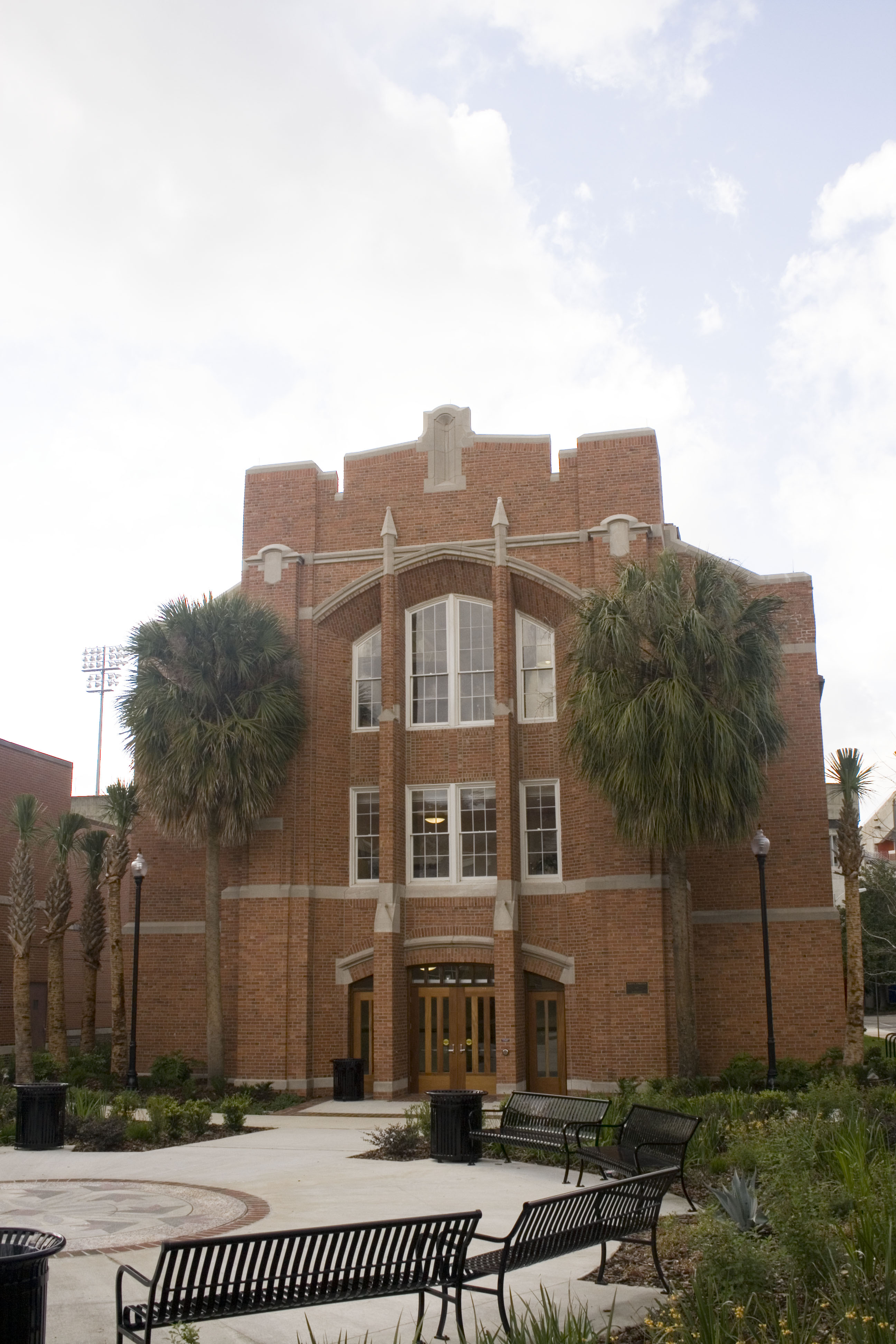
- Ustler Hall

- Location within Florida Location within the United States
- Location: Gainesville, Florida
- Coordinates: 29°39′1″N 82°20′49″W
- Built: 1919
- Architect: William Augustus Edwards
- NRHP reference No.: 79000660
- Added to NRHP: June 27, 1979

Kathryn Chicone Ustler Hall (formerly known as the Women's Gymnasium and University Gymnasium) is a historic building on the campus of the University of Florida (UF) in Gainesville, Florida. It was designed by William Augustus Edwards in the Collegiate Gothic style and opened in 1919 as the University Gymnasium. In that capacity, the building was the first home of the Florida Gators men's basketball team, and it continued to serve as the home court for most of the university's indoor sports programs until the Florida Gymnasium opened in the late 1940s. The university became co-educational at about the same time, and the building was rechristened the Women's Gymnasium and was repurposed as a recreation center for the school's many new female students. On June 27, 1979, it was added to the U.S. National Register of Historic Places.

The opening of the O'Connell Center in 1980 and new student recreation facilities made the old gym obsolete, and it gradually fell into disuse. The building was slated for demolition in the 1980s but was saved for its historic value, though it was used primarily as a storage facility for several years. A large donation by UF alumnus Kathryn Ulster made it possible to completely transform the interior into modern classrooms, offices, and other educational spaces, and the university's Women's Studies Department moved into the newly renamed Ustler Hall in 2006. It was the first academic building on the UF campus named to honor a woman, and at its rededication, it was the only freestanding campus building in the United States devoted solely to Women's Studies.

== History ==
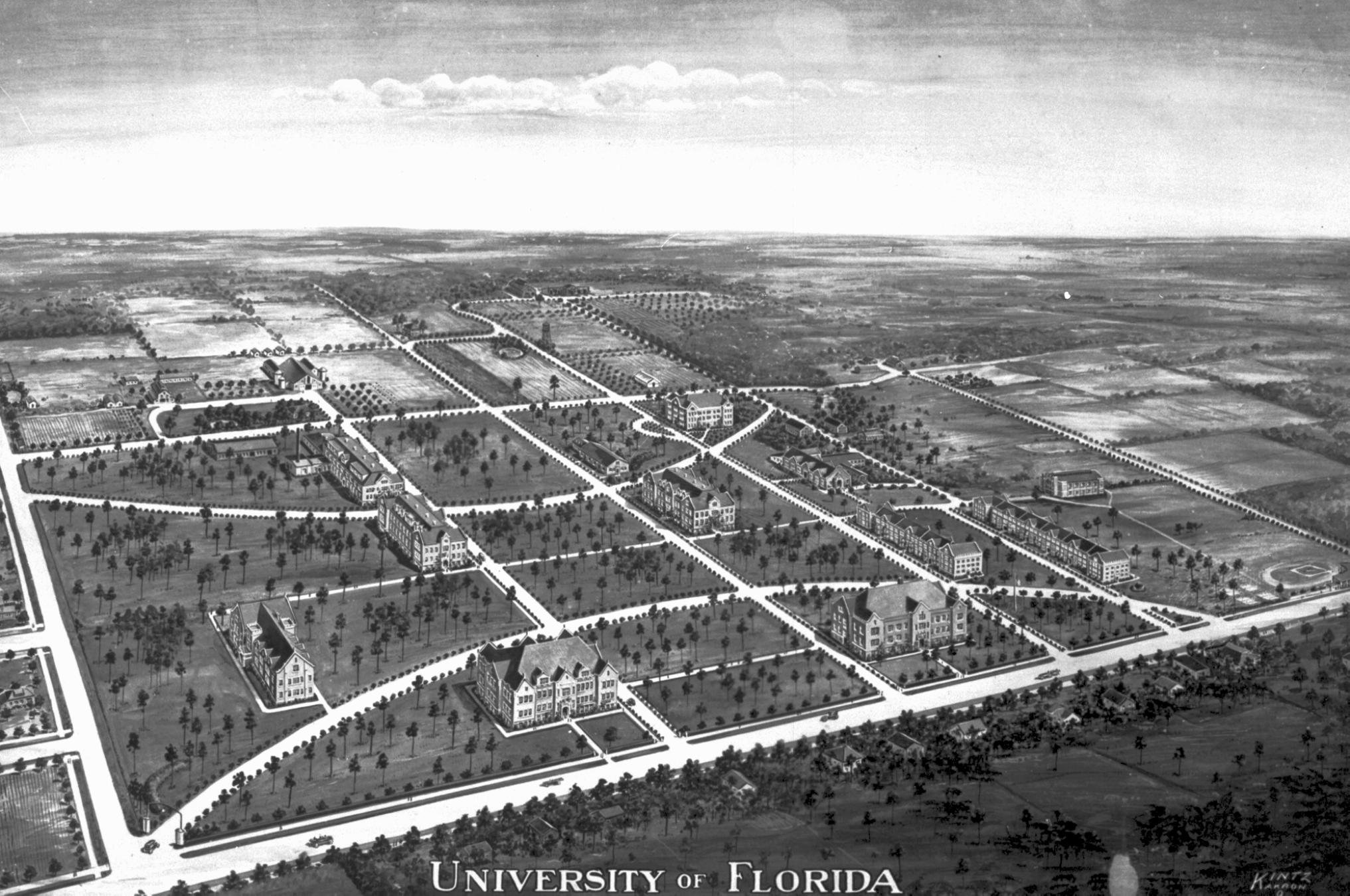
University of Florida campus just prior to construction of University Gymnasium.

=== Planning and construction ===
The University of Florida (UF) was established in Gainesville in 1906. Initial student enrollment was about 100, so only two buildings (Buckman Hall and Thomas Hall) were needed to accommodate all functions of the new school. Enrollment grew slowly over following years and accelerated under second university president Albert A. Murphree, who oversaw an expansion program that saw the addition of several colleges to the university's academic offerings and several more buildings constructed across the campus. By the end of World War I, enrollment reached 1000.

Buckman Hall included some indoor athletic space, but a larger student population required larger recreational facilities, and the university made plans to build its first dedicated gymnasium on the west side of campus. The facility was designed by William Augustus Edwards, architect for the Florida Board of Control, who designed most of the UF's early buildings in the Collegiate Gothic style. Construction began in the summer of 1918, but the project went over budget, and Murphree solicited donations from the local community to complete interior details. Fundraising successfully completed when Major League Baseball's New York Giants agreed to hold spring training in Gainesville in 1919 and rented the newly-opened University Gymnasium as their spring headquarters.

=== University Gymnasium ===
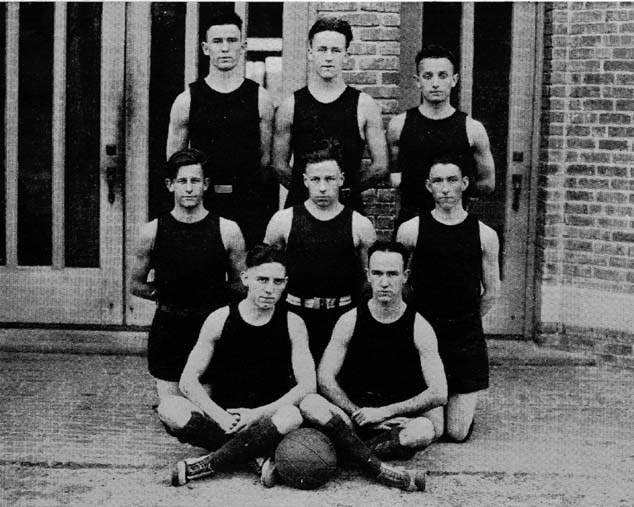
UF basketball team poses in front of University Gym, 1921

The University Gym was designed to be a combination student recreation center, physical education facility, assembly hall, and sports venue. It was the home court of the Florida Gators men's basketball team and all other university-sponsored indoor sport programs for about ten years. However, spectator space around the court was very limited in the narrow building, and as university enrollment continued to increase, a larger wooden "New Gym" was constructed directly adjacent to the University Gym in 1929 to serve as a temporary home for the basketball team until funding was available for a more permanent replacement. Meanwhile, the University Gym continued to host physical education classes, intramural sports, and smaller assemblies.

=== Women's Gymnasium ===
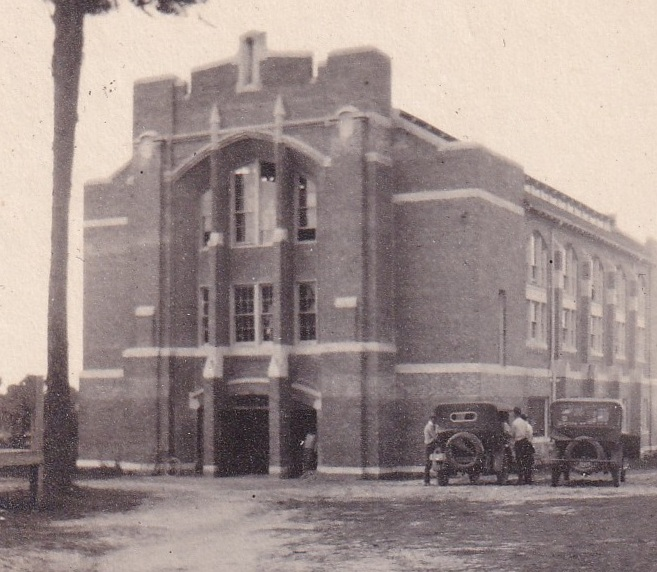
University of Florida Women's Gymnasium in the 1920s

The large brick Florida Gymnasium was finally completed in 1948, the same year that the university became fully co-educational. The University Gym was renamed the Women's Gymnasium and was used as a recreational center and physical education space for the school's many new female students while the wooden "New Gym" next door was converted into rehearsal space for the university's marching band.

The modern O'Connell Center became the new home of all of the university's indoor sports teams in 1980. The interior of the Florida Gym was redesigned and rebuilt as the new home of the physical education department, but the Women's Gym was deemed to be in need of too many repairs to justify renovation and it was slated for demolition. A community push to save the structure delayed its destruction, and in 1988, it was listed in the National Register of Historic Places, affording it protection. However, it remained underutilized and was used primarily as a storage facility for over a decade.

=== Ustler Hall ===
With a donation from UF alumna Kathryn Chicone Ustler in 2000, the long-vacant gym was transformed into a 14,700-square-foot (1,370 m^{2}) three story academic building with modern classrooms along with faculty and administrative offices. A circular courtyard was also added in front of the building, replacing a small parking area. The restoration process began in 2004 and was completed in July 2006. In 2008, the restoration was named a "Project of Regional Impact" by the Florida Heritage Foundation. Now known as Ustler Hall, the building houses the university's Department of Gender, Sexuality, and Women's Studies and the Center for Women's and Gender Studies Research. It was the first academic building on the UF campus renamed to honor a woman, and at the time of its dedication, it was the only freestanding campus building in the United States devoted solely to Women's Studies.

== See also ==
- University of Florida
- Buildings at the University of Florida
- Campus Historic District
