= Florida Gators Dazzlers =

Dance team of the University of Florida

University of Florida dazzlers
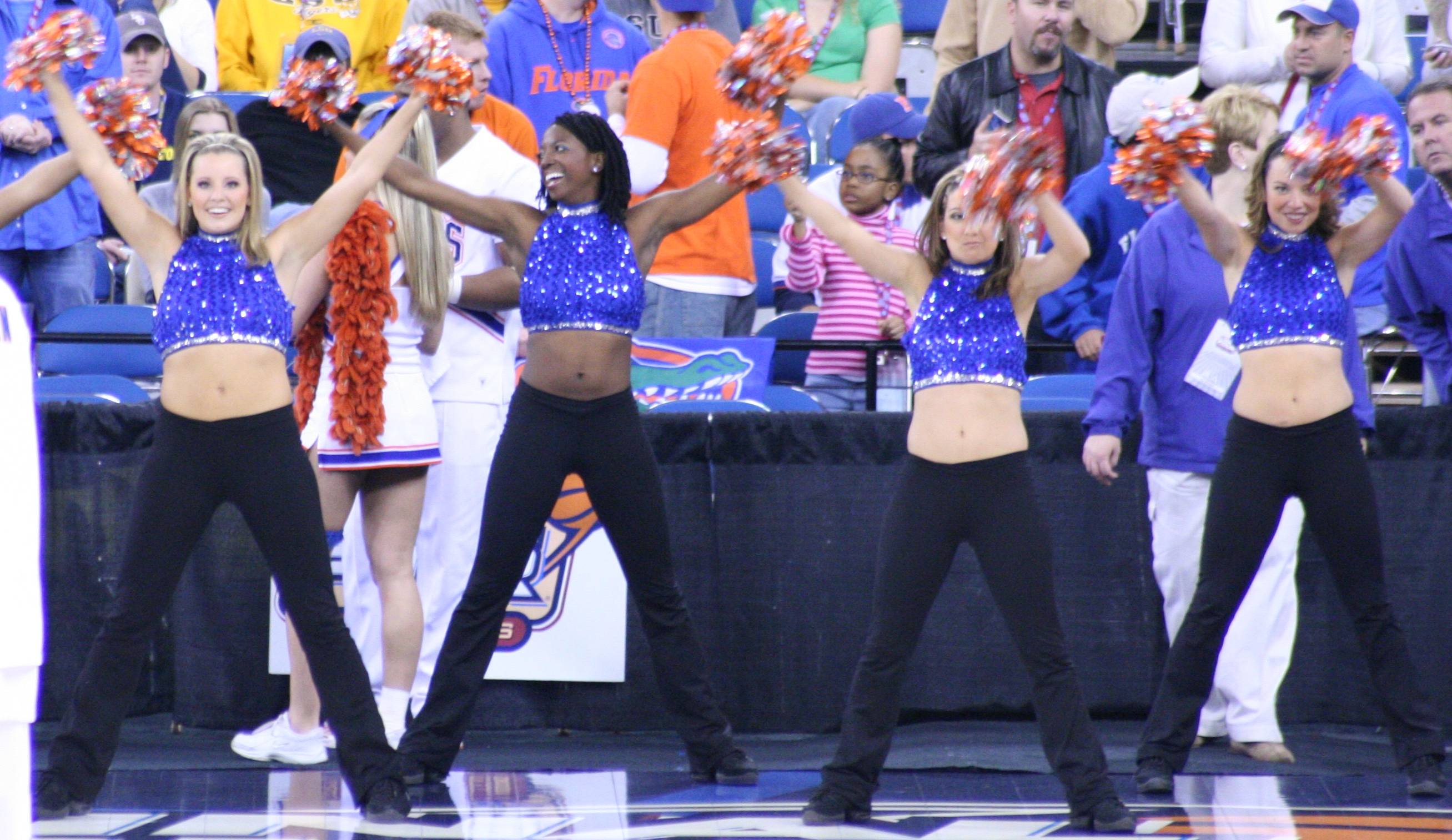
- The Dazzlers performing in Indianapolis
- Type: Dance team
- Headquarters: Gainesville, Florida
- Location: United States
- Members: 20-22 a year
- Dazzlers Head Coach: Madeline Soave
- Website: Official website

The Dazzlers are the official dance team for the University of Florida. They perform at various athletics and community events including men's and women's basketball games and home football games. The squad, made up of 20 to 22 women, also performs at the school's volleyball matches, home baseball weekend series, and gymnastics meets.

The Dazzlers also travel to the Southeastern Conference basketball tournament and the NCAA basketball tournament when Gator teams qualify.

Sports reporter Erin Andrews was a member of the Dazzlers from 1997 to 2000.

All members are required to be full-time students at the University of Florida and must maintain a minimum 2.5 semester and overall GPA. Auditions are typically held in April of each year for participation the following season.

== See also ==
- Florida Gators men's basketball
- Florida Gators women's basketball
- Florida Gators women's gymnastics
- Florida Gators women's volleyball
