= Florida–Florida State men's basketball rivalry =

American college basketball rivalry

Florida–Florida State basketball rivalry
- Florida Gators Florida State Seminoles
- First meeting: December 29, 1951; Florida 61, Florida State 51
- Latest meeting: November 10, 2026; Florida 81, Florida State 72
- Next meeting: 2027, in Gainesville

Statistics
- Total meetings: 78
- All-time series: Florida leads, 49–28* (1 game vacated)
- Largest victory: Florida, 96–61 (1999)
- Longest win streak: Florida, 7 (1965–1968); Florida State, 7 (2014–2020)
- Current win streak: Florida, 6 (2021–present)

Location of Florida and Florida State

The Florida–Florida State men's basketball rivalry (known as the Sunshine Showdown) is a college basketball rivalry between the two oldest public universities of the state of Florida: the University of Florida Gators and the Florida State University Seminoles. Although the in state rivalry between these two schools is most widely known in football, Florida and Florida State have had some memorable battles in basketball as well.

The two teams first met during the 1951/52 season, a game in which the Gators won 61–51. The rivalry has been played annually since the 1978/79 season. For both teams, it is the only out-of-conference rival that they play every season. Florida leads the rivalry overall, 49–28.

== Game results ==
| Florida victories | Florida State victories | Tie games | Forfeits / Vacated wins |

| No. | Date | Location | Winner | Score |
|---|---|---|---|---|
| 1 | 1951 | Tampa, FL | Florida | 61–51 |
| 2 | 1954 | Tampa, FL | Florida | 82–79 |
| 3 | 1956 | Gainesville, FL | Florida | 67–65 |
| 4 | 1957 | Tallahassee, FL | Florida | 71–70 |
| 5 | 1958 | Tallahassee, FL | Florida State | 82–60 |
| 6 | 1959 | Gainesville, FL | Florida | 81–71 |
| 7 | 1960 | Tallahassee, FL | Florida | 74–67 |
| 8 | 1961 | Gainesville, FL | Florida | 75–64 |
| 9 | 1961 | Gainesville, FL | Florida State | 85–71 |
| 10 | 1962 | Tallahassee, FL | Florida State | 79–56 |
| 11 | 1962 | Tallahassee, FL | Florida | 80–59 |
| 12 | 1963 | Gainesville, FL | Florida | 90–86 |
| 13 | 1963 | Tallahassee, FL | Florida | 78–55 |
| 14 | 1964 | Gainesville, FL | Florida | 52–50 |
| 15 | 1964 | Tallahassee, FL | Florida State | 51–50 |
| 16 | 1965 | Gainesville, FL | Florida | 77–65 |
| 17 | 1965 | Gainesville, FL | Florida | 75–62 |
| 18 | 1966 | Tallahassee, FL | Florida | 74–65 |
| 19 | 1966 | Gainesville, FL | Florida | 50–30 |
| 20 | 1967 | Tallahassee, FL | Florida | 90–75 |
| 21 | 1967 | Tallahassee, FL | Florida | 95–87 |
| 22 | 1968 | Gainesville, FL | Florida | 89–62 |
| 23 | 1968 | Tampa, FL | Florida State | 88–63 |
| 24 | 1978 | Gainesville, FL | Florida State | 68–61 |
| 25 | 1979 | Jacksonville, FL | Florida State | 87–70 |
| 26 | 1980 | Tallahassee, FL | Florida | 81–74 |
| 27 | 1981 | Gainesville, FL | Florida State | 82–71 |
| 28 | 1981 | Jacksonville, FL | Florida | 81–65 |
| 29 | 1982 | Tallahassee, FL | Florida State | 82–67 |
| 30 | 1982 | Tallahassee, FL | Florida | 84–63 |
| 31 | 1983 | Gainesville, FL | Florida State | 67–60 |
| 32 | 1983 | Tallahassee, FL | Florida State | 87–64 |
| 33 | 1984 | Tallahassee, FL | Florida | 68–65 |
| 34 | 1985 | Gainesville, FL | Florida | 86–79 |
| 35 | 1985 | Gainesville, FL | Florida | 85–66 |
| 36 | 1986 | Tallahassee, FL | Florida State | 80–76 |
| 37 | 1987 | Gainesville, FL | Florida | 71–48 |
| 38 | 1988 | Tallahassee, FL | Florida State | 104–86 |
| 39 | 1989 | Gainesville, FL | Florida | 82–69 |
| 40 | 1990 | Tallahassee, FL | Florida | 85–68 |

| No. | Date | Location | Winner | Score |
|---|---|---|---|---|
| 41 | 1992 | Gainesville, FL | Florida State | 68–67 |
| 42 | 1993 | Tallahassee, FL | Florida | 89–86 |
| 43 | 1993 | Orlando, FL | Florida State | 69–59 |
| 44 | 1994 | Gainesville, FL | Florida | 72–61 |
| 45 | 1994 | Orlando, FL | Florida | 71–65 |
| 46 | 1995 | Tallahassee, FL | Florida | 75–62 |
| 47 | 1995 | Orlando, FL | Florida State | 74–52 |
| 48 | 1996 | Tempe, AZ | Florida State | 79–65 |
| 49 | 1997 | Orlando, FL | Florida State | 83–81 |
| 50 | 1998 | Tallahassee, FL | Florida | 82–66 |
| 51 | 1999 | Gainesville, FL | Florida | 96–61 |
| 52 | 2000 | Tallahassee, FL | Florida | 85–70 |
| 53 | 2001 | Gainesville, FL | Florida | 68–47 |
| 54 | 2002 | Tallahassee, FL | Florida | 58–57 |
| 55 | 2004 | Gainesville, FL | Florida | 87–73 |
| 56 | 2005 | Tallahassee, FL | Florida State | 82–69 |
| 57 | 2005 | Gainesville, FL | Florida | 74–66 |
| 58 | 2006 | Tallahassee, FL | Florida State^{†} | 70–66 |
| 59 | 2007 | Gainesville, FL | Florida State | 65–51 |
| 60 | 2008 | Tallahassee, FL | Florida State | 57–55 |
| 61 | 2009 | Gainesville, FL | Florida | 68–52 |
| 62 | 2010 | Tallahassee, FL | Florida | 55–51 |
| 63 | 2011 | Gainesville, FL | Florida | 82–64 |
| 64 | 2012 | Tallahassee, FL | Florida | 72–47 |
| 65 | 2013 | Gainesville, FL | Florida | 67–66 |
| 66 | 2014 | Tallahassee, FL | Florida State | 65–63 |
| 67 | 2015 | Gainesville, FL | Florida State | 73–71 |
| 68 | 2016 | Tallahassee, FL | Florida State | 83–78 |
| 69 | 2017 | Gainesville, FL | Florida State | 83–66 |
| 70 | 2018 | Tallahassee, FL | Florida State | 81–60 |
| 71 | 2019 | Gainesville, FL | Florida State | 63–51 |
| 72 | 2020 | Tallahassee, FL | Florida State | 83–71 |
| 73 | 2021 | Gainesville, FL | Florida | 71–55 |
| 74 | 2022 | Tallahassee, FL | Florida | 76–67 |
| 75 | 2023 | Gainesville, FL | Florida | 89–68 |
| 76 | 2024 | Tallahassee, FL | Florida | 87–74 |
| 77 | 2025 | Gainesville, FL | Florida | 78–76 |
| 78 | 2026 | Tallahassee, FL | Florida | 81–72 |
Series: Florida leads 49–28
