= Florida Gators men's basketball =

Team representing the University of Florida in basketball

2026–27 Florida Gators men's basketball team
- University: University of Florida
- First season: 1915–16; 111 years ago
- Athletic director: Scott Stricklin
- Head coach: Todd Golden; 5th season, 102–40 (.718)
- Location: Gainesville, Florida
- Arena: Exactech Arena at Stephen C. O'Connell Center (capacity: 10,136)
- NCAA division: Division I
- Conference: SEC
- Nickname: Gators
- Colors: Orange and blue
- Student section: Rowdy Reptiles
- All-time record: 1,588–1,191 (.571)
- NCAA tournament record: 54–22 (.711)

NCAA Division I tournament champions
- 2006, 2007, 2025
Other NCAA Division I tournament results
Runner-up	2000
Final Four	1994, 2000, 2006, 2007, 2014, 2025
Elite Eight	1994, 2000, 2006, 2007, 2011, 2012, 2013, 2014, 2017, 2025
Sweet Sixteen	1987*, 1994, 1999, 2000, 2006, 2007, 2011, 2012, 2013, 2014, 2017, 2025
Appearances	1987*, 1988*, 1989, 1994, 1995, 1999, 2000, 2001, 2002, 2003, 2004, 2005, 2006, 2007, 2010, 2011, 2012, 2013, 2014, 2017, 2018, 2019, 2021, 2024, 2025, 2026

Conference tournament champions
- SEC: 2005, 2006, 2007, 2014, 2025

Conference regular-season champions
- SEC: 1989, 2000, 2001, 2007, 2011, 2013, 2014, 2026

Conference division champions
- SEC: 1994, 2000, 2001, 2002, 2007, 2011

Uniforms
Home	Away	Alternate
- * vacated by NCAA

The Florida Gators men's basketball team represents the University of Florida in the sport of basketball. The Gators compete in NCAA Division I's Southeastern Conference (SEC). Home games are played on Billy Donovan Court in the Exactech Arena at the Stephen C. O'Connell Center on the university's Gainesville campus.

While the University of Florida's men's basketball team first took the court in 1915, the program did not receive much support from the university for several decades. The basketball team did not have a permanent home court with adequate seating capacity until the Florida Gymnasium opened in 1949, and did not hire a full-time basketball coach until Norm Sloan in 1960, and did not play in a modern arena until the O'Connell Center opened in 1980. Early highlights included the program's first postseason appearance in the 1969 National Invitation Tournament with the Gators' first All-American Neal Walk, a run to the Sweet Sixteen during its first NCAA tournament appearance in 1987 under head coach Norm Sloan, and another surprise tournament run to the 1994 Final Four under head coach Lon Kruger. However, consistent success was elusive, and the Gators often found themselves in the bottom half of the SEC basketball standings.

The trajectory of Florida's basketball program changed with the hiring of head coach Billy Donovan in 1996. After having made five NCAA Tournament appearances and having won only two regular season SEC championship and zero SEC tournaments in 78 seasons of basketball before his arrival, the Gators won six SEC regular season championships and four SEC tournament championships, appeared in 14 NCAA Tournaments, reached four Final Fours, and won back-to-back national championships (2006 and 2007) during Donovan's 19 seasons in Gainesville before he left to coach in the NBA in 2015. Under Donovan, Florida's successes were notable as a school with a popular and dominant football team, as they remain the only school to have won the national championship in both sports in the same year (2007).

Todd Golden became the Gators' head basketball coach in March 2022. After struggling in his first season, Golden was able to establish stability within the program, returning to the NCAA tournament in 2024. In 2025, Todd Golden led the Gators to a 36–4 record, SEC Tournament championship, and the program's third national championship.

== Schedule overview ==
The college basketball season begins in early November, and the non-conference portion of the schedule typically runs until the end of the calendar year. The Gators usually compete in a cross-regional tournament against other top programs, schedule a game or two against other quality opponents in Gainesville or on the road, and play their annual game against in-state rival Florida State before the conference portion of the schedule begins.

The 18-game Southeastern Conference (SEC) slate usually tips off around the beginning of the calendar year. The schedule consists of home-and-home games against five SEC teams mixed in with single games against each of the other eight SEC teams followed by the conference tournament. Florida has built in-conference rivalries with Kentucky and Tennessee since the Gators began consistently competing for conference titles in the 1990s.

== History ==
=== Early years ===
The modern University of Florida (UF) was created when the Florida Legislature passed the Buckman Act of 1905, which consolidated four predecessor institutions into a new flagship university that opened its new Gainesville campus in 1906. The school sponsored its first varsity basketball team during the 1915–16 school year under head football coach C. J. McCoy, who led the basketball team to a 5–1 record against small colleges and local athletic clubs. The program went on hiatus during World War I and next took the court during the 1919–20 school year, though without an officially designated coach. Head football coach William G. Kline was assigned to coach basketball during the 1920–21 school year, when the team moved into their new home at recently completed University Gymnasium.

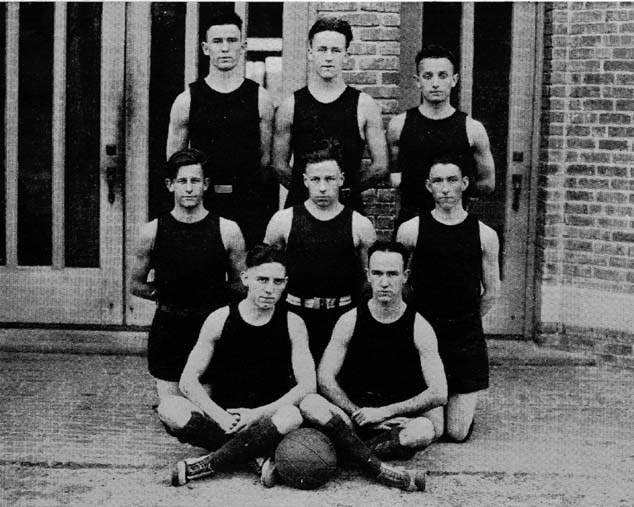
The 1920–21 Florida Gators basketball team outside of University Gym

=== The "New Gym" and Alligator Alley ===
By the mid-1920s, the basketball team had outgrown the small brick University Gymnasium, which had been designed to serve as a student recreation center and had very little spectator space. A larger wooden structure was built directly adjacent to the University Gym in 1928. While it was officially known as "Building R", it was commonly called the "New Gym". The New Gym was intended to be a temporary home for the basketball team until the school could afford a more permanent structure. However, funds soon became scarce with the coming of the Great Depression, and university president John J. Tigert's main focus was the financing and construction of Florida Field, the new football stadium which opened in 1930. Plans for a larger brick gymnasium were drawn up in 1940, but construction was delayed by World War II, and the Gators finally moved to the Florida Gymnasium (also known as Alligator Alley) during the 1949–50 season.

=== Southeastern Conference membership ===
In December 1932, the University of Florida joined the Southeastern Conference as one of its 13 charter members. While the school would find athletic success in some sports, Florida's basketball team would spend most of the first half-century of SEC play in the bottom half of the standings, as the Gators finished the season higher than fourth in the league on only four occasions over the program's first fifty years in the SEC (1933 to 1983). Until 1960, the university continued the practice of assigning coaches from other sports to lead the basketball team, including head baseball coaches Brady Cowell, Ben Clemons and Sam McAllister, head football coach Josh Cody, and football assistants Spurgeon Cherry and John Mauer. This was common practice at most SEC schools apart from Kentucky well into the 1940s and 1950s, and some of Florida's coaches had experience in the sport, as Cody had previously coached basketball at Clemson and Vanderbilt and Mauer had previously coached basketball at Kentucky and Tennessee. However, none of these part-time coaches were able to build the Gators into consistent contenders in conference play.

=== The 1960s and 1970s: Sloan and some success ===
In hopes of breathing life into the program, 34-year-old Citadel head coach Norm Sloan was hired as Florida's first full-time head basketball coach for the 1960–61 season. Sloan's first team notched the Gators' first winning conference record in eight years, and his second repeated the feat. Overall, his Florida squads compiled a record of 85–63 in six seasons during the 1960s, including the Gators' first regular season win over long-dominant Kentucky in SEC play. Sloan's Gators did not receive a postseason tournament invitation during his tenure, as tournament fields were smaller at the time and only conference champions were assured of NCAA bids. Nonetheless, according to Florida historian Norm Carlson, Sloan "elevated the Gators basketball program from a seldom competitive program and built the grass roots." Sloan left Florida after failing to receive the support of then athletic director Ray Graves, and took over as head coach at his alma mater North Carolina State after the 1965–66 season.

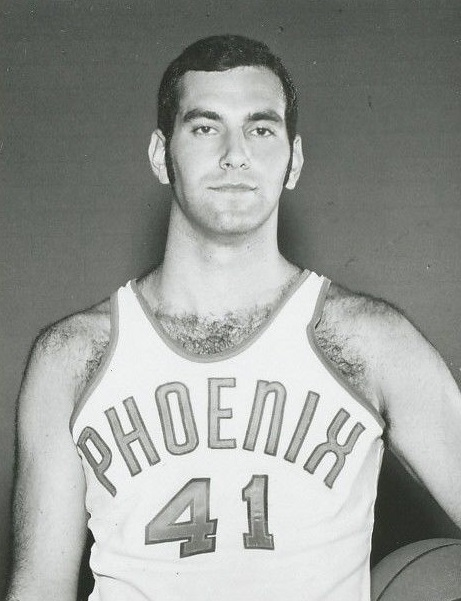
Neal Walk

Tommy Bartlett succeeded Sloan as head coach, and his first season as head coach in 1966–67 was the program's most successful to date. The Gators with a record of 21–4, finishing 2nd in the SEC to Tennessee, who beat them twice during the regular season. Florida was ranked in the AP top 10 for the first time, earning a number 10 ranking on January 9, 1967, and then a number 8 ranking the next week on January 16. Florida notched the school's first 20-win campaign on the strength of winning their final eight games of the year by an average of 19 plus points per game. Ironically at the time the SEC would only permit the league champion to play in the postseason. Having finished second, they lost to league champion Tennessee twice and were not invited to a postseason tournament. Bartlett's squads finished fifth and third in conference play the following seasons. Led by the program's first All-American in center Neal Walk (the only Gator to have his number retired) and forward Andy Owens, the 1968–69 Gators received a bid to the 1969 National Invitation Tournament, the first postseason appearance in program history. After Walk and Owens went on to play professional basketball, Bartlett could not sustain the level of talent in recruiting, and team performance declined thereafter, with four straight losing campaigns leading to his dismissal. John Lotz, a respected assistant under North Carolina's Dean Smith, succeeded Bartlett in 1973–74. Lotz's Gators peaked with a 17–9 overall record and a fourth-place conference finish (10–8 SEC) in 1976–77, but trailed off to consecutive last place conference finishes in 1978–79 and 1979–80, leading to his dismissal.

=== The 1980s: Sloan returns, success and scandal ===
The modern era of Florida basketball began in 1980, when the team moved into their current home, the O'Connell Center. Despite being only 30 years old, Florida Gym had not aged well. By the mid-1970s, Florida was the only basketball program in the SEC without a modern arena. The university built the O'Connell Center (which quickly gained the nickname "The O'Dome") as the new home for all of the university's indoor sports programs, and it proved to be a boon across several sports.

The new facility improved the basketball program in several ways, including helping to convince Norm Sloan to return to Gainesville after a successful 14-year tenure at North Carolina State which included an undefeated season in 1972–73 and an NCAA championship in 1974. Sloan later said that he'd always enjoyed his first stint at Florida, and had always been more than willing to return if the university built a more modern arena.

Sloan's second stint at Florida was easily the most successful period in program history until the late 1990s. That success was in large part because Sloan persuaded several top Florida high school basketball players—such as Gainesville's Vernon Maxwell and Brandon's Dwayne Schintzius—to stay in-state instead of attending schools with more basketball tradition. After four years of rebuilding, Sloan led the Gators to the 1984 NIT, which was only the second postseason appearance in school history. They would make the NIT again in 1985 and 1986, reaching the NIT semi-finals in 1986. In 1987, shooting guard Vernon Maxwell led the team to the school's first ever NCAA Tournament appearance, advancing all the way to the Sweet 16. Sloan coached the team to 20-win seasons and NCAA tournament appearances again the following two years, and led the Gators to the school's first-ever SEC regular season title in 1989 behind center Dwayne Schintzius.

However, after a drug scandal involving Maxwell and an NCAA investigation for various rules violations, Sloan and his coaching staff were forced to resign on October 31, 1989, just days before the start of the 1989–90 season. Former Tennessee coach Don DeVoe was brought in as the interim coach, but the defending SEC champions struggled to a 7–21 record. In September 1990, the NCAA sentenced the program to two years' probation for numerous major violations dating back to 1985. Their 1987 and 1988 NCAA Tournament appearances were erased from the record books due to Maxwell being retroactively declared ineligible for secretly taking money from a sports agent, and Sloan was slapped with a five-year show-cause penalty that effectively ended his coaching career. The most severe penalty in the long run, however, was a reduction to 13 total scholarships in 1991–92 and 14 in 1992–93, which affected the program for several years. Draconian as those penalties were, the NCAA said that it would have banned the Gators from postseason play and live television in 1990–91 had Sloan still been coach. (Maxwell's 1987 and 1988 season statistics were later restored on September 18, 2025, making him again as Florida basketball's career leading scorer.)

=== Lon Kruger era 1990-1996 ===
Lon Kruger, former head coach at Kansas State, took over the program before the 1990–91 season. Despite the probation he inherited, Kruger slowly brought the team to increased success and reached the NIT semifinals in his second year as coach. In 1993–94, the pieces fell into place for Florida to have their best season ever at that time. Behind Andrew DeClercq and Dametri Hill, the Gators went to their first Final Four following a dramatic victory over UConn where Donyell Marshall missed two free throws with no time on the clock to force overtime, where the Gators eventually prevailed. They lost to Duke in the national semifinal, 70–65. The next year, they returned to the NCAA tournament, but were eliminated in the first round. Kruger's final season in 1995–1996 resulted in a losing record, and he left to coach at Illinois.

=== Billy Donovan era 1996-2015 ===
Florida's Athletic Director, Jeremy Foley, looking for a young coach with a proven track record, hired 30-year-old Billy Donovan, then at Marshall, as Kruger's replacement. His recruiting prowess was evident early, bringing future NBA star Jason Williams with him from Marshall and having early recruiting classes with future NBA players Mike Miller, Udonis Haslem, and Matt Bonner, among others. The Gators made the NCAA tournament every year from 1999 to 2007, a nine-year streak that is the school record, and the sixth-longest NCAA Tournament streak.

==== Rebuilding to a Final Four ====
Donovan's first two seasons at Florida proved to be the two worst during his tenure at Florida. The Gators posted a two-year win–loss record of 27–32, missing postseason play entirely in his first season, and losing in the first round of the NIT in his second season. These were the last losing records that the Gators suffered until 2014–15.

In his third season, however, Donovan's Gators finished the season with an overall record of 22–9, and earned the No. 6 seed in the West Regional of the 1999 NCAA tournament. The Gators defeated Penn and Weber State to advance to the Sweet Sixteen in Phoenix, where they were upset by No. 10 seed Gonzaga.

Donovan took his Gators on a memorable run during his fourth season in Gainesville. The Gators finished the season 29–8, including winning a share of the SEC championship. In the 2000 SEC tournament, however, the Gators were upset in the second round by Auburn. Florida received the No. 5 seed in the East Regional of the 2000 NCAA tournament, though the Gators had to survive an upset bid by Butler on Mike Miller's buzzer-beating floater in overtime. They then swept through the region by beating Illinois, Duke, and Oklahoma State to reach the Final Four. In the national semifinals, Florida knocked off North Carolina to advance to their first NCAA national championship game, before losing to heavily favored and top seeded Michigan State.

Over the next five years the Gators went to the NCAA Tournament every year, but they found themselves upset victims five straight times in the first or second round. In the 2001 NCAA tournament, Florida received the No. 3 seed in the South Region. They defeated No. 14 Western Kentucky in the first round, but they were then upset by the No. 11 seed, Temple.

The following year, in 2002, the Gators received the No. 5 seed in the Midwest Region of the 2002 NCAA tournament. They were knocked off in the first round by No. 12 seed Creighton. The 2003 Florida Gators finished the season 24–7, and received the No. 2 seed in the South Region of the 2003 NCAA tournament. The Gators easily defeated Sam Houston State in the first round, but were then upset by No. 7 seed Michigan State in the second round. In 2004, the Gators were the No. 5 seed in the East Rutherford Regional of the 2003–2004 NCAA tournament, but were upset in the first round by the No. 12 seed, Manhattan.

The 2004–05 team had the distinction of being the first to garner an automatic bid to the NCAA Tournament, when it defeated Kentucky in the 2005 SEC tournament championship. The Gators subsequently received the No. 4 seed in the Syracuse Regional of the 2004–2005 NCAA tournament. They knocked off the No. 13 seed, Ohio in the first round, but lost to No. 5 seed Villanova in the second round.

==== 2005–06: First NCAA national championship season ====
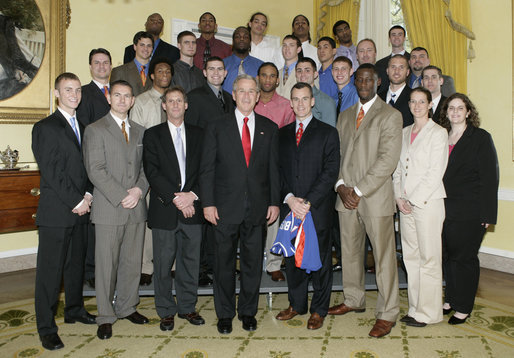
The 2005–06 Gators basketball team with President George W. Bush at the White House following their national championship.

The 2005–06 team began the season unranked and went on a 17–0 winning streak for the best start in school history, surprising many with a young (four sophomores and one junior) squad following the graduation of David Lee and the departures of Matt Walsh and Anthony Roberson to the NBA. The trio accounted for 60 percent of their offense in 2005. The team faded late in the regular season, losing its last 3 games in February and entering the postseason with a 24–6 record, yet still managed to win its second consecutive SEC tournament championship.

The Gators entered the 2006 NCAA Division I men's basketball tournament as a No. 3 seed with a 27–6 record, and ranked No. 10 by the AP. They beat No. 14 seed South Alabama and No. 11 seed Milwaukee to advance to the Minneapolis regional. There, the Gators defeated the No. 7 seed Georgetown Hoyas and upset the No. 1 seed Villanova Wildcats 75–62 to avenge their loss in the previous year's tournament and move on to their second Final Four under Donovan.

Florida defeated the upstart George Mason Patriots, the No. 11 seed from the Washington, D.C. regional, by a score of 73–58 in the national semifinals in Indianapolis. On April 3, 2006, the Gators defeated the UCLA Bruins 73–57 in the national final to win the school's first men's basketball NCAA Championship. The University of Florida Athletic Association then purchased the floor used in Indianapolis for the Final Four, and installed it in the O'Connell Center.

==== 2006–07: Second NCAA national championship season ====
Championship banners in the O'Connell Center

The Gators returned all five starters from their 2006 championship team to begin the 2006–07 basketball season ranked as the preseason No. 1 in both major media polls, a first for the Gators. The Gators locked up the SEC Championship relatively early in the 2006–07 season and were in possession of a 24–2 record before going on a late-February 1–3 skid that mirrored their 0–3 run a year earlier. For the second season in a row, the losses in February would be their last. Florida closed out Kentucky on Senior Night to end the regular season 26–5, and won their third straight SEC tournament championship with relative ease, beating Georgia, Ole Miss, and Arkansas 77–56.

Florida entered the 2007 NCAA Division I men's basketball tournament as the No. 1 overall seed in the tournament, and they advanced to the Final Four after wins in the regional against No. 5 seed Butler and No. 3 seed Oregon. In a rematch of the 2006 title game, the Gators again eliminated the UCLA Bruins in the national semifinal. Florida defeated the Ohio State Buckeyes 84–75, in a rematch of a game they won 86–60 three months earlier, to become the first team since the 1991–92 Duke Blue Devils to win back-to-back national championships and the first college team ever to repeat as national champions with the same starting line-up. The University of Florida also has the distinction of being the only school in NCAA history to have won both the basketball and football national championships in the same season (won the football championship in January 2007, which was the 2006 season) and the only school in NCAA history to win a combined four national championships in three seasons (football in 2006 and 2008 and basketball in 2006 and 2007). Also during this season, Donovan passed Sloan as the winningest coach in school history. Lee Humphrey, the team's shooting guard became the all-time leader for three-point shots made in the NCAA Tournament and all-time leading three-point scorer at Florida.

The starting five of Brewer, Green, Horford, Humphrey, and Noah nicknamed themselves "the 04s" (pronounced "oh-fours") since they enrolled at Florida in 2004. They were known for their camaraderie on and off the court, as Brewer, Green, Horford and Noah were roommates during their entire time in college. Following the 2006–07 season, three of the Gators' starting five were drafted among the first ten picks in the first round of the 2007 NBA draft: Horford (third), Brewer (seventh), and Noah (ninth). Taurean Green and Chris Richard were both selected in the second round. All five starters and sixth man Chris Richard later played professionally. All of them, except Humphrey, were selected in the 2007 NBA draft. Horford went on to become a five-time NBA All-Star center and won the 2024 NBA Finals with the Boston Celtics. Noah also became an NBA All-Star center and was named the 2014 NBA Defensive Player of the Year with the Chicago Bulls.

==== 2008–2010: Rebuilding ====
In the aftermath of the Gators second NCAA championship, Donovan accepted the head coaching position for the NBA's Orlando Magic on May 31, 2007. On June 3, however, it was disclosed that Donovan asked to be released from his contract with the Magic, which was announced when he was reintroduced as the Gators head coach on June 7.

The Gators failed to qualify for the NCAA Tournament in 2008 and 2009. The Gators were eliminated by UMass in the semi-finals of the 2008 National Invitation Tournament. The following season, the Gators were eliminated by Penn State in a quarter-final game of the 2009 National Invitation Tournament. In 2010, the Gators received an invitation to the 2010 NCAA Division I men's basketball tournament as a No. 10 seed, but they were eliminated in the first round by No. 7 seed BYU in double overtime.

==== 2011–2013: Three straight Elite Eight appearances ====
In the 2011 NCAA Division I men's basketball tournament, the Gators were the No. 2 seed in the Southeast region after winning the SEC Championship, after being defeated in the 2011 SEC men's basketball tournament championship game to Kentucky, and finishing with a 26–7 record. They played their two first games in Tampa, Florida. In the Second Round of the Tournament, Florida beat No. 15 seed, UC Santa Barbara Gauchos. In the third round, the Gators defeated the No. 7 seed, the UCLA Bruins to advance to the Sweet Sixteen in New Orleans. On March 24, 2011, the Gators got some revenge by defeating the No. 3 seed, BYU, who had knocked them out of the NCAA Tournament the year before, by a score of 83–74 in overtime to advance to the Elite Eight for the first time since 2007. Their tournament run ended there as they were stunned in the Regional Final against No. 8 seed Butler in overtime.

In the 2012 NCAA Division I men's basketball tournament, the Gators were the No. 7 seed in the West Region after losing in the 2012 SEC men's basketball tournament semifinals to Kentucky, finishing with an overall record of 23–10. Florida defeated the No. 10 seed, Virginia, and the No. 15 seed, Norfolk State, to advance to the Sweet 16 in Phoenix. They defeated No. 3 seed Marquette in an upset to advance to the Elite Eight, but their run ended when they were defeated by the No. 4 seed, Louisville, 72–68, after blowing a 65–54 lead with 8:14 remaining in the game.

The 2012–13 Gators finished the regular season with an overall record of 24–6, and won the SEC Championship with a conference record of 14–4. During the regular season, Billy Donovan notched his 400th career win as the head coach of the Gators over Missouri. After losing in the final of the 2013 SEC men's basketball tournament to Mississippi, they entered the 2013 NCAA Division I men's basketball tournament as the No. 3 seed in the South Region. Florida defeated the No. 14 seed Northwestern State 79–47 in the first round, and advanced to the Sweet Sixteen after soundly beating the No. 11 seed, Minnesota, 78–64. The Gators then defeated Florida Gulf Coast, No. 15 seed, in the Sweet Sixteen 62–50. But once again, their run ended in the Elite Eight, this time against fourth seeded Michigan, who handily defeated the Gators, 79–59. The Gators became the first team since the expansion of the tournament in 1951 to lose in the Elite Eight in three consecutive seasons.

Florida is the only program in the nation to have advanced as far as the Elite Eight in each of those seasons from 2011 to 2013.

==== 2014: Return to Final Four ====
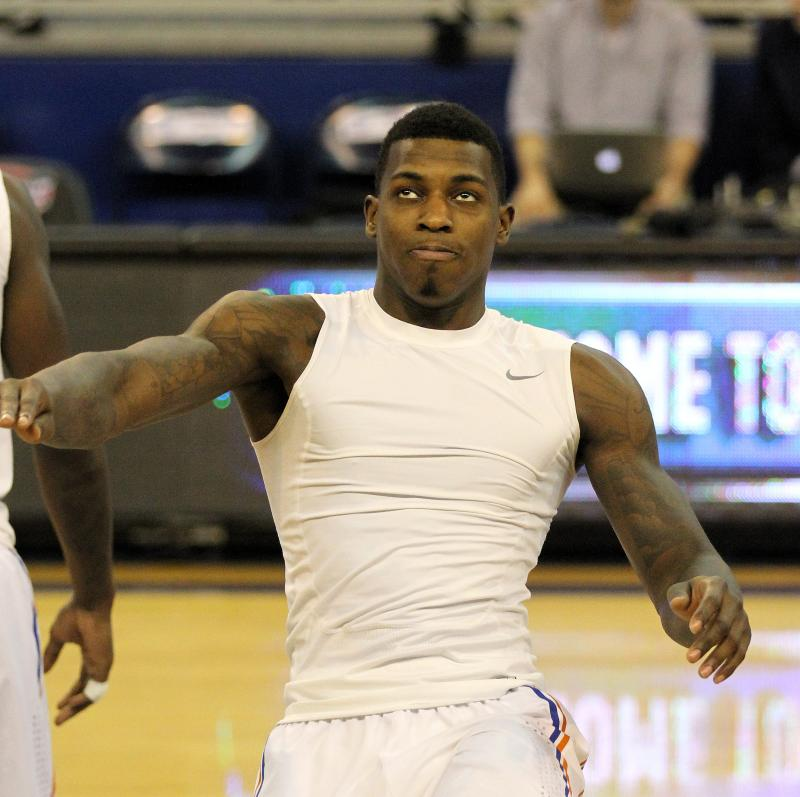
Casey Prather

The 2013–14 Gators finished the SEC regular season with an 18–0 record in conference play, the first SEC team to ever accomplish the feat, after the SEC re-expanded to an 18-game regular season schedule prior to the 2012–13 season. In doing so, the Gators won their seventh SEC championship, and their third in four seasons. The Gators then beat the Kentucky Wildcats for the third time in the season to claim their fourth SEC Tournament championship title.

By claiming the SEC tournament, the Gators earned an automatic bid to the NCAA tournament, and were selected as the No.1 overall seed, and were placed in the South Regional. The Gators' school record win streak reached 30 as they defeated their first four tournament opponents by double digits, finally breaking through in the Elite 8 with a 62–52 win over Dayton to advance to the Final Four as the only remaining No.1 seed. In the national semifinals, Florida faced Connecticut, which had been the last team to defeat them back on December 2, 65–64. The Gators got off to a quick start and built a 16–4 lead, but the Huskies were able to catch up and led 25–22 at halftime in a defensive battle. The Gators continued to struggle to score in the second half and suffered their third (and worst) loss of the season, 63–53.

The team's program-best 36–3 record resulted in many individual honors. Billy Donovan was named the SEC's Coach of the Year for the third time. Senior point guard Scottie Wilbekin was named Southeastern Conference Men's Basketball Player of the Year, the SEC Tournament MVP, and the Most Outstanding Player of the NCAA South region. Senior center Patric Young was named the Defensive Player and Scholar-Athlete of the Year, junior forward Dorian Finney-Smith was named Sixth Man of the Year, and senior guard Casey Prather was named to the All-SEC First Team.

==== 2015: First losing record in 17 years ====
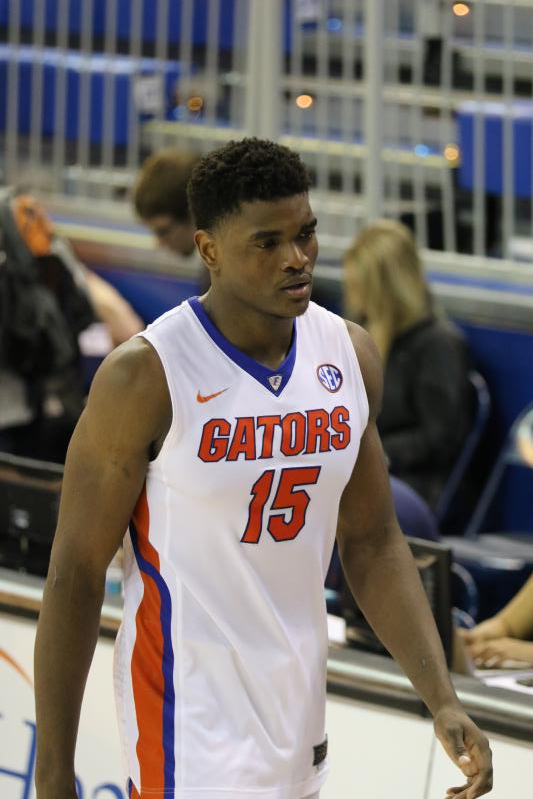
John Egbunu

The 2014–15 Gators finished the season 16–17, 8–10 in SEC play to finish in a tie for eighth place. They did not participate in a postseason tournament for the first time in 17 years. The woeful season included losses to in-state rivals Miami and Florida State, and three losses to SEC champion Kentucky. The Gators' 63.7 points-per-game were their lowest in the 19-year coaching tenure of Billy Donovan. After the season, Donovan accepted an offer to coach the NBA's Oklahoma City Thunder. He would leave Florida as far and away the winningest coach in program history. He led the Gators to 14 NCAA tournament appearances, six SEC regular season titles (four outright, two shared) and four SEC Tournament championships–in all three cases, more than all other coaches in program history combined.

=== Mike White era 2015-2022 ===
On May 7, 2015, former Louisiana Tech head coach Mike White was hired to coach the Gators, succeeding Billy Donovan. White played point guard at Ole Miss and later served as an assistant there for seven seasons. He is a native of the state of Florida and had led Louisiana Tech to three straight conference titles.

In his first season at the helm, he led Florida to a 21–15 record and a berth in the NIT Tournament, defeating North Florida and Ohio State in the first two rounds before losing to eventual-NIT champion George Washington in the quarterfinal. White's second Gator squad was the best of his tenure, as Florida went 24–7, finished 2nd in the SEC standings, and earned a #4 seed in the 2017 NCAA tournament. They reached the Elite Eight on a three-point buzzer beater by guard Chris Chiozza to beat Wisconsin, then were upset one game short of the Final Four by SEC rival South Carolina, 77–70.

Florida earned invitations to four straight NCAA tournaments and won at least one game in each appearance under White (not counting the 2020 NCAA tournament, which was cancelled due to the COVID-19 pandemic). However, after 2017, they earned a decreasing number of wins each season, were never a serious contender for SEC championships, and had a 10–15 record in games played in March. After a disappointing 2021-22 season in which Florida did not earn a berth in the NCAA tournament, White left to become the head coach at Georgia.

=== Todd Golden era 2022-present ===
==== Rebuilding to a tournament appearance ====
On March 18, 2022, former San Francisco head coach Todd Golden was named Florida's new head basketball coach. Golden's first season ended with the Gators going 16–17, with a 9–9 SEC record and finishing 8th in conference play. They received an at-large bid to the NIT, but were eliminated by UCF in the first round.

Golden built on this success towards planning for the 2023–24 season, where he invested heavily in the transfer portal, gaining players such as Zyon Pullin, Walter Clayton Jr. and Tyrese Samuel as well as the recruitments of forwards Alex Condon and Thomas Haugh. Much improved from the prior season, a 21–10 regular season and 11–7 SEC record was good enough to earn the Gators the 6-seed in the SEC tournament, where they defeated Georgia, Alabama, and Texas A&M on their way to the SEC championship before losing to Auburn 86–67. This earned the Gators the No. 7 seed in the South Regional in the 2024 NCAA tournament, where they played the No. 10 seed Colorado. A late jump shot by KJ Simpson with 1.7 seconds left saw the Gators fall to the Buffaloes 102–100. Despite a first round exit in the NCAA tournament, the 2023–24 season marked a major stepping stone in Florida's return to national prominence.

==== 2024–25: Third NCAA national championship season ====
With the return of Walter Clayton Jr. and Will Richard, Florida remained focused on the return to national prominence. This would be improved upon with the gaining of transfers Rueben Chinyelu and most importantly Alijah Martin, who went on a Final Four run with FAU two years prior.

The Gators started off ranked No. 21 in the AP Poll and after a 13–0 start, the Gators found themselves ranked No. 6 before suffering their first loss to Kentucky to begin SEC play. After losing to Kentucky in their conference opener, they responded by defeating No. 1 Tennessee by 30 points on January 7th and then defeating No. 1 Auburn by 9 points on February 8th, becoming the fifth team in NCAA history to defeat two No. 1 teams in the same season. Florida finished the regular season 27–4, with a 14–4 record good enough for 2nd place in the SEC. After defeating Missouri and Alabama, Florida defeated Tennessee 86–77 to win their first SEC tournament championship since 2014.

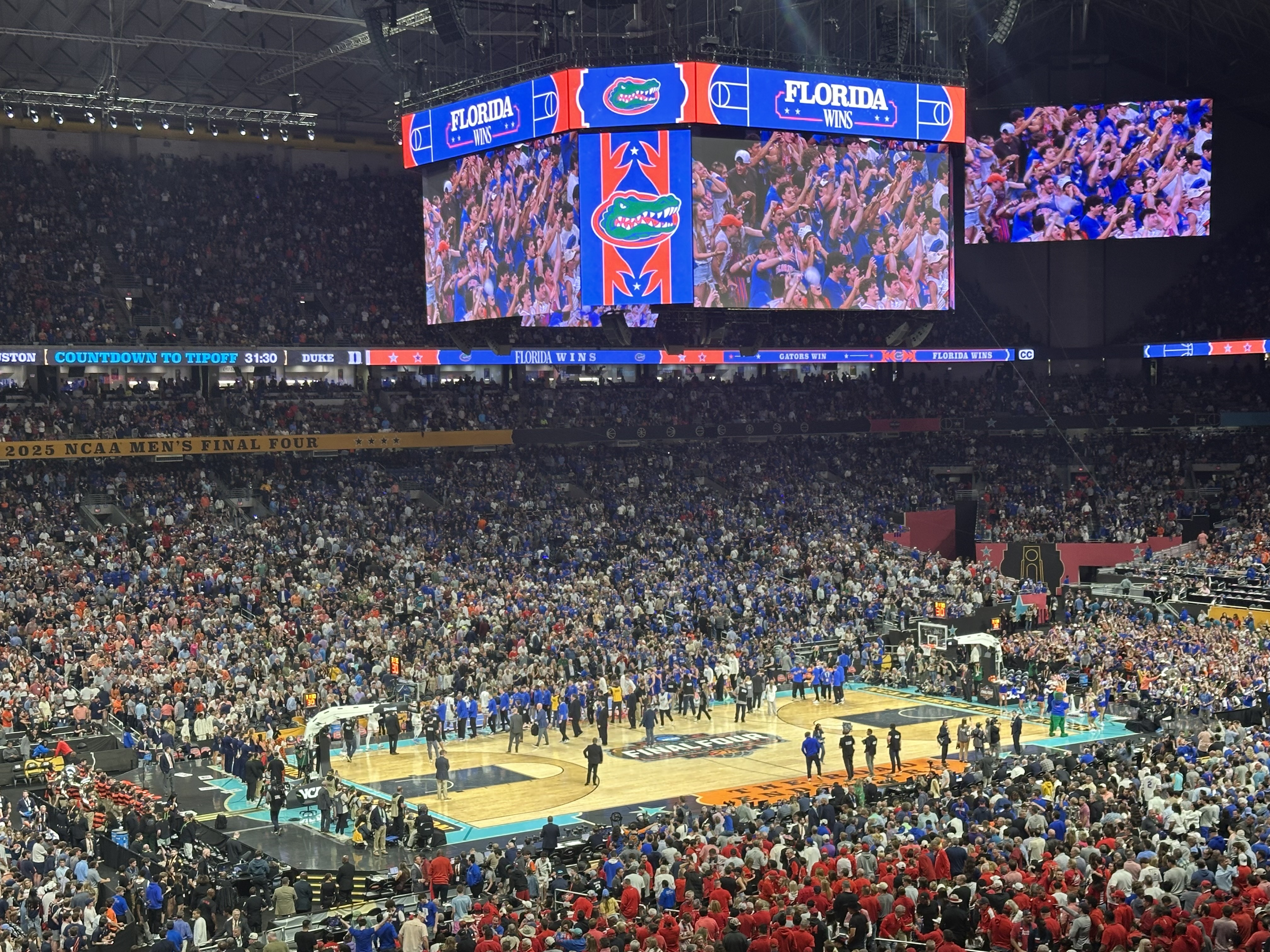
The Alamodome after Florida's 79–73 win over Auburn in the 2025 Final Four

Locking in the No. 1 seed in the West Regional, Florida went on to defeat Norfolk State 95–69 to set up a match with the two-time defending national champions UConn in the Round of 32. After trailing for most of the game, Clayton Jr.'s 23 points led the Gators past the Huskies 77–75. Their comeback victory over UConn proved to be a trend for Florida during the tournament, as they orchestrated three additional comeback wins later in the tournament. Their 87–71 win over Maryland in the Sweet Sixteen set up a matchup with Texas Tech in the Elite Eight. Down 9 points with 3:14 left to play, four straight 3-pointers from Clayton Jr. and Haugh helped the Gators defeat the Red Raiders 84–79 and secure Florida's first Final Four appearance since 2014. In the Final Four, the Gators defeated Auburn, overcoming a 9-point second-half deficit off of Walter Clayton Jr.'s 34 points. Clayton Jr. became the first player to score 30+ points in both the Elite Eight and Final Four since Larry Bird in 1979. On April 7, 2025, Golden led Florida to its first National Championship since the 2006–07 season with a 65–63 win over the Houston Cougars. Clayton Jr. was named the Final Four MOP.

== Rivalries ==
Over the course of its history, Florida has formed several fierce rivalries with several schools in men's basketball.

=== Kentucky ===
The Kentucky Wildcats have won eight national championships, reaching 17 Final Fours, and claiming 50 SEC Titles, while the Florida Gators have won three national championships, six Final Fours and seven SEC Titles. In competition, Kentucky has a 111-43 all-time lead in games, and since 2005, Kentucky has won 27-19 games against Florida, who won two of the three meetings in the SEC Championship Game in that span. The Gators are the only basketball program to beat Kentucky seven straight times.

=== Georgia ===
As is the case with FSU, Florida's border series with Georgia is known far more for its iterations on the football field than the basketball court. Nevertheless, the two schools have gradually developed a rivalry in basketball as well, having played each other more than any other SEC opponent throughout their respective histories. While Georgia controlled the series in its early days, Florida has dominated Georgia in modern times; as of 2026, the Gators have won 37 of the last 45 games and 14 of the last 15. As a result, the Gators currently lead the all-time series, 128-104. The rivalry has grown even more intense in recent seasons, with former Florida coach Mike White departing to take the job at Georgia.

=== Connecticut ===
Though Florida and UConn have only played eight times, the two schools have developed a tenacious rivalry due to both programs often enjoying success at the same time and therefore squaring off in unusually high-stakes games. Seven of the eight games between the two programs have been decided by ten points or fewer. UConn leads the series, 6-2, although Florida leads 2-1 in the NCAA Tournament. The Gators won the first such meeting with a thrilling 69-60 overtime victory in the 1994 Sweet 16. 20 years later, UConn returned the favor with a 63-53 upset of Florida in the 2014 Final Four, which ended a 30-game Florida winning streak. The Gators would get their revenge eleven years later in the 2025 Round of 32, snapping the Huskies’ streak of 13 consecutive NCAA Tournament victories and ending their quest for a third consecutive national title with a 77-75 win on their way to claiming the national championship for themselves.

=== Florida State ===
While Florida and FSU are best known for their football rivalry, the Gators and Seminoles have developed an intense basketball rivalry through the years as well. For many years, the basketball game was scheduled within a few days of the annual football game, but more recently has been played within the first two weeks of the season. Though FSU enjoyed a seven-game win streak in the series from 2014-2020, the Gators have since rebounded, having won five straight in the rivalry and lead the all-time series, 48-28.

== Championships ==
=== 2006 NCAA Title ===
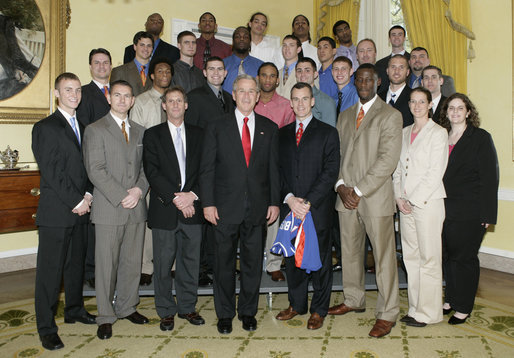
The 2006 Florida national championship team at the White House

In 2006, head coach Billy Donovan led the Gators to the first national title in program history and a final record of 33–6. Florida entered the NCAA tournament as the No. 3 seed in the Minneapolis Regional, and wins over South Alabama, Milwaukee, Georgetown, and Villanova sent Florida to the program's first Final Four. They defeated George Mason 73–58 in the National Semifinals to advance to play against UCLA in the National Championship.

Florida won its first national title with a 73–57 victory. Joakim Noah was named the tournament's Most Outstanding Player.

2006 NCAA Tournament
Round	Opponent	Score
Round #1	#14 South Alabama	76–50
Round #2	#11 Milwaukee	82–60
Sweet 16	#7 Georgetown	57–53
Elite 8	#1 Villanova	75–62
Final Four	#11 George Mason	73–58
Championship	#2 UCLA	73–57

=== 2007 NCAA Title ===
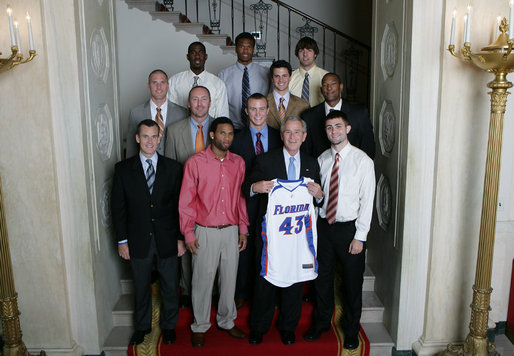
The 2007 Florida national championship team at the White House

In 2007, head coach Billy Donovan led the Gators to a second straight national championship and a final record of 35–5. Florida entered the NCAA tournament as a No. 1 seed, and wins over Jackson State, Purdue, Butler, and Oregon sent Florida back to the Final Four. They defeated UCLA 76–66 in the National Semifinals to advance to play against Ohio State in the National Championship.

Florida won its second national title with an 84–75 victory. Corey Brewer was named the tournament's Most Outstanding Player.

Florida also became the first school in NCAA Division I history to hold the major college football national championship and the men's basketball national championship in the same academic year.

2007 NCAA Tournament
Round	Opponent	Score
Round #1	#16 Jackson State	112–69
Round #2	#8 Purdue	74–67
Sweet 16	#5 Butler	65–57
Elite 8	#3 Oregon	85–77
Final Four	#2 UCLA	76–66
Championship	#1 Ohio State	84–75

=== 2025 NCAA Title ===
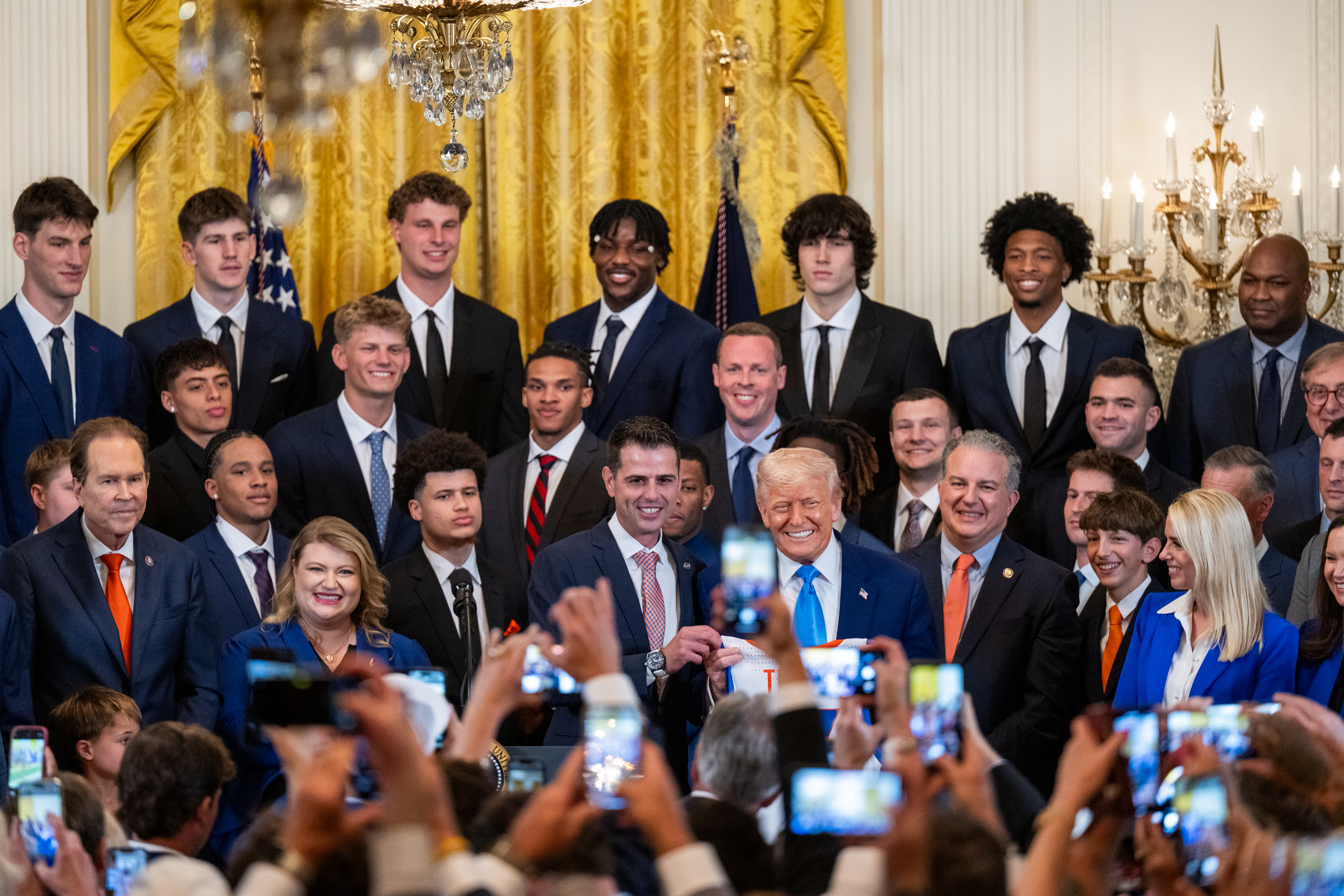
The 2025 Florida national championship team at the White House

In 2025, head coach Todd Golden led Florida to its third national championship and first since 2007, finishing the season with a 36–4 record. The Gators entered the NCAA tournament as the No. 1 seed in the West Region, and wins over Norfolk State, defending two-time national champion UConn, Maryland, and Texas Tech sent Florida to its first Final Four since 2014. They defeated Auburn 79–73 in the National Semifinals to advance to play against Houston in the National Championship.

Florida won its third national title with a 65–63 victory. Walter Clayton Jr. was named the tournament's Most Outstanding Player.

2025 NCAA Tournament
Round	Opponent	Score
Round #1	#16 Norfolk State	95–69
Round #2	#8 UConn	77–75
Sweet 16	#4 Maryland	87–71
Elite 8	#3 Texas Tech	84–79
Final Four	#1 Auburn	79–73
Championship	#1 Houston	65–63

=== SEC Tournament championships ===
The Gators have won five SEC Tournament championships, four of which came under Billy Donovan, including three in a row from 2005 to 2007.

Season	Coach	Result	Site	Overall record	SEC record
2004–05	Billy Donovan	Florida 70, Kentucky 53	Georgia Dome	24–8	12–4
2005–06	Billy Donovan	Florida 49, South Carolina 47	Bridgestone Arena	33–6	10–6
2006–07	Billy Donovan	Florida 77, Arkansas 56	Georgia Dome	35–5	13–3
2013–14	Billy Donovan	Florida 61, Kentucky 60	Georgia Dome	36–3	18–0
2024–25	Todd Golden	Florida 86, Tennessee 77	Bridgestone Arena	36–4	14–4
Total SEC Tournament Championships: 5

=== SEC Championships ===
Though the automatic berth in the NCAA Tournament is given to the conference tournament winner, the SEC declares the team with the best record in the regular season the "official" conference champion. The Gators have won a total of eight official (regular season) SEC championships. Norm Sloan won the first one during the 1988–89 season. Billy Donovan won the next six, including the 2006–07 season in which the Gators also won the SEC Tournament championship and NCAA national championship, and three in a four-year span from 2010–11 to 2013–14. Todd Golden won the SEC during the 2025–26 season.

The 2013–14 squad became the first team in SEC history to have an 18–0 regular season conference record.

Season	Coach	Overall record	SEC record
1988–89	Norm Sloan	21–13	13–5
1999–00	Billy Donovan	29–8	12–4
2000–01	Billy Donovan	24–7	12–4
2006–07	Billy Donovan	35–5	13–3
2010–11	Billy Donovan	29–8	13–3
2012–13	Billy Donovan	29–8	14–4
2013–14	Billy Donovan	36–3	18–0
2025–26	Todd Golden	27–8	16-2
Total SEC Championships: 8

== Complete postseason results ==
=== NCAA tournament results ===
Florida has appeared in the NCAA tournament 26 times. Their combined record is 54–22. However, their appearances in 1987 and 1988 have been vacated by the NCAA making their official record 51–20. They were NCAA National Champions in 2006, 2007, and 2025.

Year	Seed	Round	Opponent	Results
1987*	No. 6	Round of 64; Round of 32; Sweet Sixteen	11 NC State; 3 Purdue; 2 Syracuse	W 82–70; W 85–66; L 81–87
1988*	No. 6	Round of 64; Round of 32	11 St. John's; 3 Michigan	W 62–59; L 85–108
1989	No. 7	Round of 64	10 Colorado State	L 46–68
1994	No. 3	Round of 64; Round of 32; Sweet Sixteen; Elite Eight; Final Four	14 James Madison; 11 Penn; 2 Connecticut; 9 Boston College; 2 Duke	W 64–62; W 70–58; W 69–60 ^{OT} W 74–66; L 65–70
1995	No. 10	Round of 64	7 Iowa State	L 61–64
1999	No. 6	Round of 64; Round of 32; Sweet Sixteen	11 Penn; 14 Weber State; 10 Gonzaga	W 75–61; W 82–74 ^{OT} L 72–73
2000	No. 5	Round of 64; Round of 32; Sweet Sixteen; Elite Eight; Final Four; National Championship	12 Butler; 4 Illinois; 1 Duke; 3 Oklahoma State; 8 North Carolina; 1 Michigan State	W 69–68 ^{OT} W 93–76; W 87–78; W 77–65; W 71–59; L 76–89
2001	No. 3	Round of 64; Round of 32	14 WKU; 11 Temple	W 69–56; L 54–75
2002	No. 5	Round of 64	12 Creighton	L 82–83
2003	No. 2	Round of 64; Round of 32	15 Sam Houston State; 7 Michigan State	W 85–55; L 46–68
2004	No. 5	Round of 64	12 Manhattan	L 60–75
2005	No. 4	Round of 64; Round of 32	13 Ohio; 5 Villanova	W 67–62; L 65–76
2006	No. 3	Round of 64; Round of 32; Sweet Sixteen; Elite Eight; Final Four; National Championship	14 South Alabama; 11 Milwaukee; 7 Georgetown; 1 Villanova; 11 George Mason; 2 UCLA	W 76–50; W 82–60; W 57–53; W 75–62; W 73–58; W 73–57
2007	No. 1	Round of 64; Round of 32; Sweet Sixteen; Elite Eight; Final Four; National Championship	16 Jackson State; 9 Purdue; 5 Butler; 3 Oregon; 2 UCLA; 1 Ohio State	W 112–69; W 74–67; W 65–57; W 85–77; W 76–66; W 84–75
2010	No. 10	Round of 64	7 BYU	L 92–99 ^{2OT}
2011	No. 2	Round of 64; Round of 32; Sweet Sixteen; Elite Eight	15 UC Santa Barbara; 7 UCLA; 3 BYU; 8 Butler	W 79–51; W 73–65; W 83–74 ^{OT} L 71–74 ^{OT}
2012	No. 7	Round of 64; Round of 32; Sweet Sixteen; Elite Eight	10 Virginia; 15 Norfolk State; 3 Marquette; 4 Louisville	W 71–45; W 84–50; W 68–58; L 68–72
2013	No. 3	Round of 64; Round of 32; Sweet Sixteen; Elite Eight	14 Northwestern State; 11 Minnesota; 15 Florida Gulf Coast; 4 Michigan	W 79–47; W 78–64; W 62–50; L 59–79
2014	No. 1	Round of 64; Round of 32; Sweet Sixteen; Elite Eight; Final Four	16 Albany; 9 Pittsburgh; 4 UCLA; 11 Dayton; 7 Connecticut	W 67–55; W 61–45; W 79–68; W 62–52; L 53–63
2017	No. 4	Round of 64; Round of 32; Sweet Sixteen; Elite Eight	13 East Tennessee State; 5 Virginia; 8 Wisconsin; 7 South Carolina	W 80–65; W 65–39; W 84–83 ^{OT} L 70–77
2018	No. 6	Round of 64; Round of 32	11 St. Bonaventure; 3 Texas Tech	W 77–62; L 66–69
2019	No. 10	Round of 64; Round of 32	7 Nevada; 2 Michigan	W 70–61; L 49–64
2021	No. 7	Round of 64; Round of 32	10 Virginia Tech; 15 Oral Roberts	W 75–70^{OT} L 78–81
2024	No. 7	Round of 64	10 Colorado	L 100–102
2025	No. 1	Round of 64; Round of 32; Sweet Sixteen; Elite Eight; Final Four; National Championship	16 Norfolk State; 8 Connecticut; 4 Maryland; 3 Texas Tech; 1 Auburn; 1 Houston	W 95–69; W 77–75; W 87–71; W 84–79; W 79–73; W 65–63
2026	No. 1	Round of 64; Round of 32	16 Prairie View A&M; 9 Iowa	W 114-55; L 72-73

* Vacated by the NCAA

==== NCAA Tournament seeding history ====
The NCAA began seeding the tournament with the 1979 edition.

Year →	'87	'88	'89	'94	'95	'99	'00	'01	'02	'03	'04	'05	'06	'07	'10	'11	'12	'13	'14	'17	'18	'19	'21	'24	'25	'26
Seed →	6	6	7	3	10	6	5	3	5	2	5	4	3	1	10	2	7	3	1	4	6	10	7	7	1	1

=== NIT results ===
The Gators have appeared in the National Invitation Tournament (NIT) 12 times. Their combined record is 14–14.

Year	Round	Opponent	Results
1969	First Round	Temple	L 66–82
1984	First Round	South Alabama	L 87–88
1985	First Round	Southwestern Louisiana	L 64–65
1986	First Round; Second Round; Quarterfinals; Semifinals; 3rd Place Game	Southern Miss; TCU; SW Missouri State; Wyoming; Louisiana Tech	W 81–71; W 77–75; W 54–53; L 58–67; L 62–67
1992	First Round; Second Round; Quarterfinals; Semifinals; 3rd Place Game	Richmond; Pittsburgh; Purdue; Virginia; Utah	W 66–52; W 77–74; W 74–67; L 56–62; L 78–81
1993	First Round	Minnesota	L 66–74
1998	First Round	Georgetown	L 69–71
2008	First Round; Second Round; Quarterfinals; Semifinals	San Diego State; Creighton; Arizona State; Massachusetts	W 73–49; W 82–54; W 70–57; L 66–78
2009	First Round; Second Round; Quarterfinals	Jacksonville; Miami (FL); Penn State	W 84–62; W 74–60; L 62–71
2016	First Round; Second Round; Quarterfinals	North Florida; Ohio State; George Washington	W 97–68; W 74–66; L 77–82
2022	First Round; Second Round	Iona; Xavier	W 79–74; L 56–72
2023	First Round	UCF	L 49–67

== Final Fours ==
The Florida Gators have been to six Final Fours.

Lon Kruger took the Gators to their first one in 1994. Florida received the No.3 seed in the East Region (played in Miami). The Gators swept through the region with victories over 14th seeded James Madison, 11th seeded Pennsylvania, 2nd seeded Connecticut and punched their ticket to their first ever Final Four by knocking off the upstart, 9th seeded Boston College. But the Gators then lost to Duke in the national semifinals.

Billy Donovan took them back six years later in 2000, winning the East Region (played in Syracuse, New York) as the No.5 seed. To get to the Final Four, Florida first had to survive a tough test from 12th seeded Butler in the first round in Winston-Salem, North Carolina. Trailing 68–67 with time running out, the Gators won on a last second shot by Mike Miller. After that initial test, Florida ran through the rest of the region, easily defeating 4th seeded Illinois, top seeded Duke, and 3rd seeded Oklahoma State to reach the Final Four, where they defeated North Carolina in the semifinals, but lost to Michigan State in the national championship game.

Donovan would get Florida back to the Final Four in 2006, winning the Minneapolis Regional as the No.3 seed with victories over 14th seeded South Alabama, 11th seeded UW-Milwaukee, 7th seeded Georgetown and top seeded Villanova in the Regional Final. The Gators proceeded to knock off upstart George Mason (who won the Washington, D.C. Regional as the No.11 seed) in the semifinals and then handily defeated UCLA in the championship game for their first ever national championship.

The next year, Donovan's Gators would make it not only back to back Final Fours, but back to back national championships as well. They received the top seed in the St. Louis Regional, and defeated 16th seeded Jackson State, 9th seeded Purdue, 5th seeded Butler and 3rd seeded Oregon in the Regional Final to earn a trip to their 4th Final Four. There, they dispatched UCLA in the semifinals and then Ohio State in the title game.

Over the next decade, Florida reached the doorstep of the Final Four several times but was usually turned away. From 2011 to 2014, the Gators made four consecutive trips to the Elite Eight. Florida held late leads in the first two of them, but lost both times, first to Butler in overtime, and then the following year, blew a 65–54 lead with eight minutes to go and fell to Louisville. In 2013, Florida made its third straight trip to the Elite 8, but this time got blown out by Michigan. Florida finally broke through against Dayton in their fourth straight Regional final appearance and moved on to play eventual 2014 national champions Connecticut in the Final Four, where they were defeated 63–53. After a two-year absence from the NCAA Tournament, Mike White got them back to the Elite Eight in 2017, where the Gators built a halftime lead but were again defeated, this time by SEC rival South Carolina.

Florida then regressed under White and plateaued, never even reaching a Sweet 16 again under his leadership. White then departed for rival Georgia and was replaced by Todd Golden, who promptly rebuilt the program back to the levels of success enjoyed under Donovan. In his third season in Gainesville, Golden’s Gators rode the momentum they’d built from an SEC Tournament Championship to reach the program’s sixth Final Four. Along the way, Florida defeated 16th seeded Norfolk State in the Round of 64, avenged the 2014 Final Four loss to 8th seeded UConn with a thrilling 77–75 win in the Round of 32, overcame a rough start to blow out 4th seeded Maryland in the Sweet 16, and punched its ticket to the Final Four with a historic comeback against 3rd seeded Texas Tech in the Elite 8. Playing in San Francisco – the city in which Golden got his first head coaching job – the Gators erased a 75–66 deficit with 2:55 to go and stormed back to pull off a stunning 84–79 victory over the Red Raiders. The following weekend at the Final Four in San Antonio, Florida would erase a pair of daunting second-half deficits to cap their storybook run, roaring back from 49-40 down to beat Auburn 79-73 in the semifinal and then climbing out of a 42-30 hole in the finals to against Houston, defeating the Cougars 65-63 for the Gators' third national championship.

Season	Coach	Region	Regional final result	Final Four site	Semifinal result	Championship Game result
1993–94	Lon Kruger	Miami, FL	Florida 74, Boston College 66	Charlotte, NC	Duke 70, Florida 65	N/A
1999–00	Billy Donovan	Syracuse, NY	Florida 77, Oklahoma State 65	Indianapolis, IN	Florida 71, North Carolina 59	Michigan State 89, Florida 76
2005–06	Billy Donovan	Minneapolis, MN	Florida 75, Villanova 62	Indianapolis, IN	Florida 73, George Mason 58	Florida 73, UCLA 57
2006–07	Billy Donovan	St. Louis, MO	Florida 85, Oregon 77	Atlanta, GA	Florida 76, UCLA 66	Florida 84, Ohio State 75
2013–14	Billy Donovan	Memphis, TN	Florida 62, Dayton 52	Arlington, TX	Connecticut 63, Florida 53	N/A
2024–25	Todd Golden	San Francisco, CA	Florida 84, Texas Tech 79	San Antonio, TX	Florida 79, Auburn 73	Florida 65, Houston 63
Total Final Four appearances: 6

== Awards ==
=== National awards ===
Naismith Memorial Basketball Hall of Fame One former Florida Gator has been inducted into the Naismith Memorial Basketball Hall of Fame.

Year Inducted	Name	Position	Years at Florida
2025	Billy Donovan	Head coach	1996–2015

All-Americans Florida Gators basketball players who have been recognized as All-Americans include:

- Neal Walk, center; AP Second Team; UPI Second Team; NABC Third Team (1968)
- Neal Walk, center; AP Third Team; NABC Third Team; UPI Third Team (1969)
- Udonis Haslem, center; AP Third Team (2001)
- Udonis Haslem, center; NABC Second Team (2002)
- Al Horford, forward-center; AP Third Team; NABC Second Team (2007)
- Joakim Noah, forward-center; AP Consensus Second Team; NABC Second Team; USBWA Second Team (2007)
- Scottie Wilbekin, point guard; AP Third Team; NABC Third Team; Sporting News Third Team (2014)
- Walter Clayton Jr., point guard; Consensus First Team (2025)
- Thomas Haugh, forward; Consensus Second Team (2026)

John R. Wooden Legends of Coaching Award

- Billy Donovan (2010)

National Defensive Player of the Year

- Rueben Chinyelu (2026)

Pete Newell Big Man of the Year

- Patric Young (2014)

NCAA Tournament Most Outstanding Player

- Joakim Noah (2006)
- Corey Brewer (2007)
- Walter Clayton Jr. (2025)

=== Conference awards ===
SEC Coach of the Year

- Lon Kruger (1992)
- Lon Kruger (1994)
- Billy Donovan (2011)
- Billy Donovan (2013)
- Billy Donovan (2014)
- Mike White (2017)
- Todd Golden (2026)

SEC Player of the Year

- Chandler Parsons (2011)
- Scottie Wilbekin (2014)

SEC Defensive Player of the Year

- Corey Brewer (2006)
- Patric Young (2014)
- Rueben Chinyelu (2026)

SEC Freshman of the Year

- Ronnie Williams (1981)
- Andrew Moten (1984)
- Anthony Roberson (2003)
- Nick Calathes (2008)

SEC Sixth Man of the Year

- Chris Richard (2007)
- Dorian Finney-Smith (2014)
- Canyon Barry (2017)
- Urban Klavžar (2026)

SEC Tournament MVP

- Livingston Chatman (1989)
- Matt Walsh (2005)
- Taurean Green (2006)
- Al Horford (2007)
- Scottie Wilbekin (2014)
- Walter Clayton Jr. (2025)

== NBA draft ==
There have been 40 Florida players selected in the NBA draft, including 13 first-round picks and 7 lottery picks. Bill Tanzler was the first Florida player to be drafted, selected with the 59th overall pick in 1949 by the Providence Steamrollers. In the 2007 NBA draft, the Gators set a school record with five selections, including three top-10 picks.

Player	Year	Round	Pick	Team
Bill Tanzler	1949	7	59	Providence Steamrollers
Joe Hobbs	1958	9	62	Minneapolis Lakers
Cliff Luyk	1962	4	27	New York Knicks
Brooks Henderson	1965	4	34	Los Angeles Lakers
Gary Keller	1967	6	59	Los Angeles Lakers
Dave Miller	1968	12	159	Milwaukee Bucks
Neal Walk#	1969	1	2	Phoenix Suns
Andy Owens	1970	11	174	Seattle SuperSonics
Eugene Shy	1976	10	163	New York Knicks
Len Saunders	1977	8	169	Denver Nuggets
Larry Brewster	1978	10	200	San Antonio Spurs
Malcolm Cesare	1979	4	86	Phoenix Suns
Vernon Delancy	1984	3	67	Milwaukee Bucks
Ronnie Williams	1984	2	47	Boston Celtics
Eugene McDowell	1985	3	68	Miami Heat
Andrew Moten	1987	4	72	New Jersey Nets
Vernon Maxwell	1988	2	47	Denver Nuggets
Dwayne Schintzius	1990	1	24	San Antonio Spurs
Andrew DeClercq	1995	2	34	Golden State Warriors
Jason Williams#	1998	1	7	Sacramento Kings
Donnell Harvey	2000	1	22	New York Knicks
Mike Miller#	2000	1	5	Orlando Magic
Matt Bonner	2003	2	45	Chicago Bulls
Christian Drejer	2004	2	51	New Jersey Nets
David Lee	2005	1	30	New York Knicks
Al Horford#	2007	1	3	Atlanta Hawks
Corey Brewer#	2007	1	7	Minnesota Timberwolves
Joakim Noah#	2007	1	9	Chicago Bulls
Chris Richard	2007	2	41	Minnesota Timberwolves
Taurean Green	2007	2	52	Portland Trail Blazers
Marreese Speights	2008	1	16	Philadelphia 76ers
Nick Calathes	2009	2	45	Minnesota Timberwolves
Chandler Parsons	2011	2	38	Houston Rockets
Vernon Macklin	2011	2	52	Detroit Pistons
Bradley Beal#	2012	1	3	Washington Wizards
Erik Murphy	2013	2	49	Chicago Bulls
Tre Mann	2021	1	18	Oklahoma City Thunder
Scottie Lewis	2021	2	56	Charlotte Hornets
Walter Clayton Jr.	2025	1	18	Washington Wizards
Alijah Martin	2025	2	39	Toronto Raptors
Will Richard	2025	2	56	Memphis Grizzlies

# NBA Lottery Pick

== Currently in the NBA ==
- Al Horford (2004–07 at UF), Golden State Warriors
- Bradley Beal (2011–12 at UF), Los Angeles Clippers
- Dorian Finney-Smith (2013–16 at UF), Houston Rockets
- Tre Mann (2019–21 at UF), Charlotte Hornets
- Colin Castleton (2020–23 at UF), Orlando Magic
- Zyon Pullin (2023–24 at UF), Minnesota Timberwolves (two-way)
- Walter Clayton Jr. (2023–25 at UF), Dallas Mavericks
- Will Richard (2022–25 at UF), Golden State Warriors
- Alijah Martin (2024–25 at UF), Toronto Raptors

== School records ==
=== Individual career ===
Record	Player	Total	Years
Most points	Vernon Maxwell	2,450	1984–1988
Most rebounds	Neal Walk	1,181	1967–1969
Most assists	Chris Chiozza	571	2015–2018
Most steals	Vernon Maxwell	206	1984–1988
Most blocked shots	Dwayne Schintzius	272	1987–1990

=== Individual season ===
Record	Player	Total	Year
Most points	Walter Clayton Jr.	713	2024–25
Most rebounds	Neal Walk	494	1967–68
Most assists	Nick Calathes	231	2008–09
Most steals	Dan Cross	76	1993–94
Most blocked shots	Dwayne Schintzius	95	1986–87

== Retired numbers ==
Florida has retired one jersey number.

No.	Player	Position	Career
41	Neal Walk	C	1967–1969

== Home courts ==
Florida Gator men's basketball home courts
University Gymnasium	1920–1927
Building R / New Gym	1928–1949
Florida Gym / Alligator Alley	1950–1980
Stephen C. O'Connell Center (Exactech Arena since 2017)	1980–present

== See also ==
- Florida Gators
- Florida Gators Dazzlers
- Florida Gators women's basketball
- Florida–Kentucky men's basketball rivalry
- History of the University of Florida
- List of Florida Gators in the NBA
- List of University of Florida Athletic Hall of Fame members
- University Athletic Association
- Florida-Florida State men's basketball rivalry

== Bibliography ==
- Dortch, Chris, String Music: Inside the Rise of SEC Basketball, Brassey's, Inc., Dulles, Virginia (2002). ISBN 1-57488-439-5.
- Koss, Bill, Pond Birds: Gator Basketball, The Whole Story From The Inside, Fast Break Press, Gainesville, Florida (1996). ISBN 978-0-8130-1523-1.
