= Florida Gymnasium =

- U.S. Historic district – Contributing property
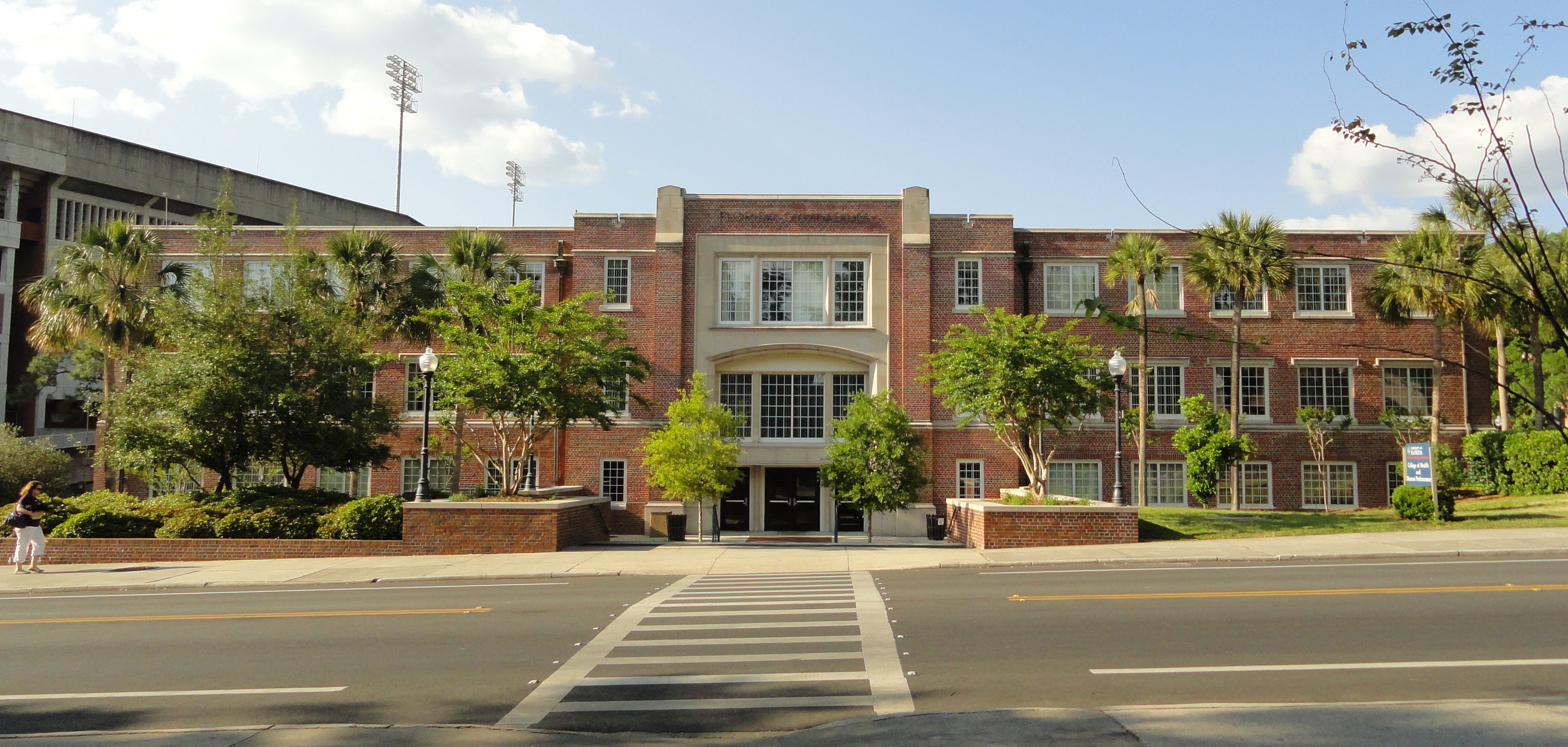

- Location within Florida Location within the United States
- Location: Gainesville, Florida
- Coordinates: 29°38′56″N 82°20′50″W
- Built: 1949
- Architect: Rudolph Weaver and Guy Fulton
- Architectural style: Collegiate Gothic
- Website: Official site

The Florida Gymnasium (commonly known as the "Florida Gym" and formerly nicknamed "Alligator Alley") is a historic building located on the campus of the University of Florida (UF) in Gainesville. It opened in 1949 as a 7,000-seat multi-purpose arena and served as the home court of the Florida Gators men's basketball team and other UF indoor sports programs for over thirty years, acquiring the nickname of "Alligator Alley" during that time.

The Stephen C. O'Connell Center replaced the Florida Gym as the university's main indoor facility for intercollegiate sports upon its opening in 1980. The old gym was gradually repurposed for use by the University of Florida College of Health and Human Performance (HHP) in the following years, with a series of renovations and rebuilding projects converting most of the interior space into modern classrooms, laboratories, offices, and other educational facilities by the mid-1990s. The center of the gym still features a basketball court which is used for small assemblies and HHP classes and activities.

== History ==
=== Earlier facilities ===
The University of Florida's first indoor sports facility was the University Gymnasium, a narrow brick building that opened in 1919. The school's men's basketball team used the University Gym for practices and games, but since the building had been designed primarily for student recreation, there was little room for spectators. By the mid-1920s, the university had decided that it was not suitable for hosting intercollegiate sports programs and a larger gymnasium was needed.

The university's funding declined with the onset of the Great Depression, making the construction of a new brick gymnasium cost prohibitive. Instead, a wooden facility officially dubbed "Building R" but commonly referred to as the "New Gym" was built directly adjacent to the University Gym as a temporary home for the school's indoor sports teams. However, an ongoing lack of funds throughout the 1930s resulted in Gator basketball teams using the New Gym for over 20 years.

=== The Florida Gym ===
Design work on a larger gymnasium was started in the early 1940s by university architect Rudolph Weaver, but the project was postponed during World War II. Plans were completed by Guy Fulton soon after the war, construction began in 1947, and the Florida Gymnasium finally opened in 1949 at total project cost of $1.6 million. The university became co-educational about the same time, and the old University Gymnasium became the Women's Gymnasium while the "New Gym" was converted into a rehearsal space for the university's marching bands.

The Florida Gymnasium was the second large indoor venue on campus after the University Auditorium and was the only space large enough to host the entire student body, which numbered about 10,000 when the facility was completed. Around the central arena, offices in the building housed the university's athletic administration along with the College of Physical Education, Health and Athletics. The court at the Florida Gym also became the site of student class registration at the beginning of each semester.

==== Alligator Alley ====
As a sports venue, the Florida Gym soon gained a nickname: Alligator Alley. It could be an intimidating place for opposing teams because the seating was very close to the court and, when full, the noise level was "deafening". However, it also had few amenities and no air conditioning, and the court had to be shared by all UF indoor sports programs. Over the years it came to be seen as small and outdated; observers likened it to a "dismal and dreary old high school gym" rather than a major-college arena.

By the early 1970s, Florida was the only school in the Southeastern Conference without a modern basketball facility, which hampered the recruiting of top players and held back the growth of its long-mediocre basketball program. The university initiated plans to build a large multi-purpose sports arena in the mid-1970s, and the O'Connell Center opened in December 1980 as the new home for all of UF's indoor athletic programs.

=== Later uses ===
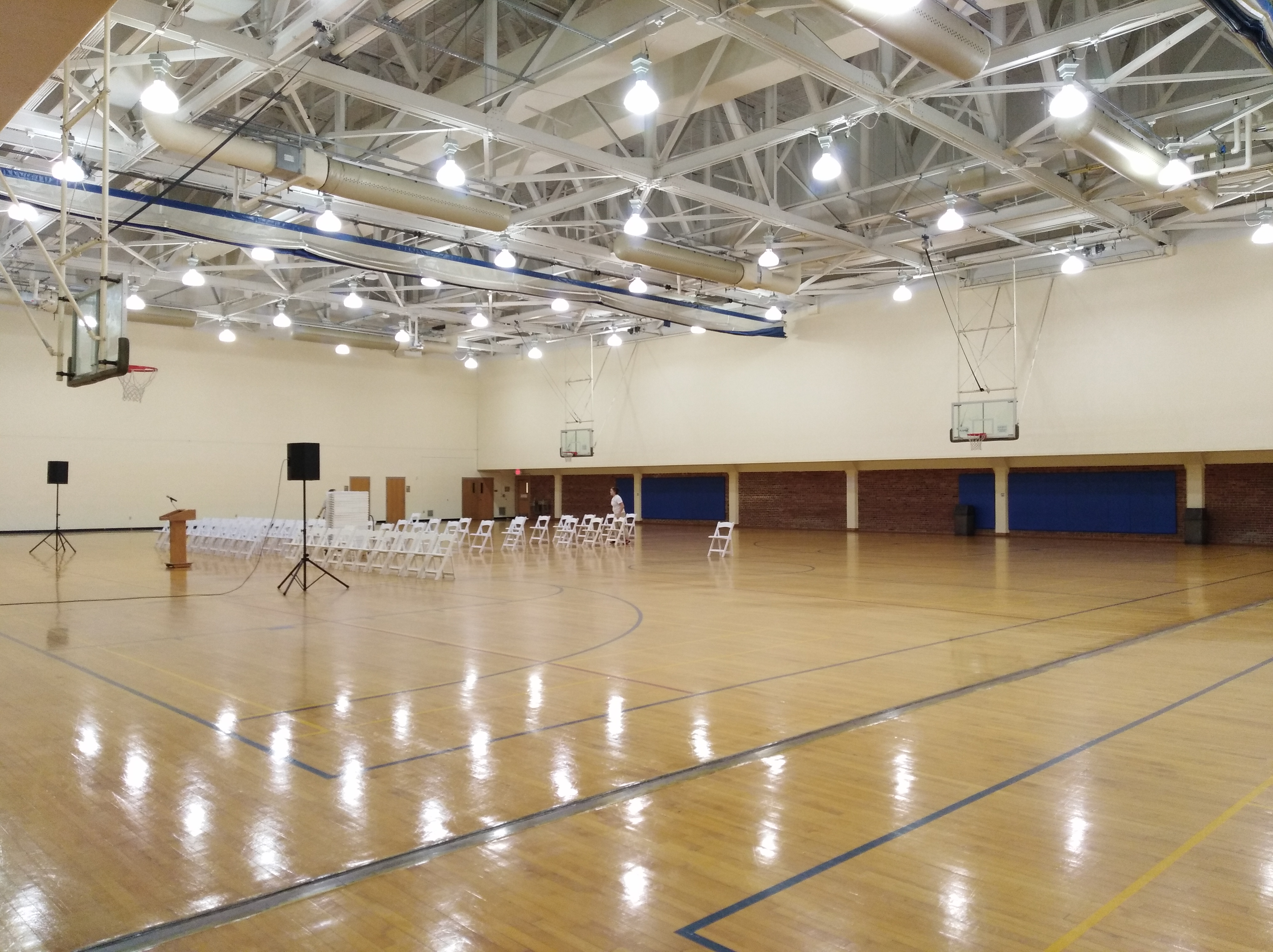
Interior of the Florida Gym in 2019

The Florida Gymnasium was gradually adapted to other uses during the 1980s. The basketball court and adjoining areas were used for student recreation and occasional events and assemblies while a series of minor renovations modernized the facilities of the re-named College of Health and Human Performance. The gym continued to be the site of class registration until the early 1990s, when an automated phone system and then online registration made in-person registration obsolete.

The Florida Gym was no longer needed for student recreation after a modern fitness center was constructed directly behind the gym in 1990 and the much larger Southwest Recreation Center opened across campus in 1994. The gym underwent a major renovation and repurposing project in the mid-1990s that removed the last of the original bleachers and converting much of the interior space into modern classrooms, laboratories, offices, and meeting rooms. The basketball court remained at the center of the building and is still used for College of Health and Human Performance activities and small events.

In 2008, Florida Gymnasium became a contributing property in the University of Florida Campus Historic District which was added to the National Register of Historic Places on April 20, 1989.

== See also ==
- Buildings at the University of Florida
- History of the University of Florida
