= Erin Andrews =

American sportscaster and television personality (born 1978)

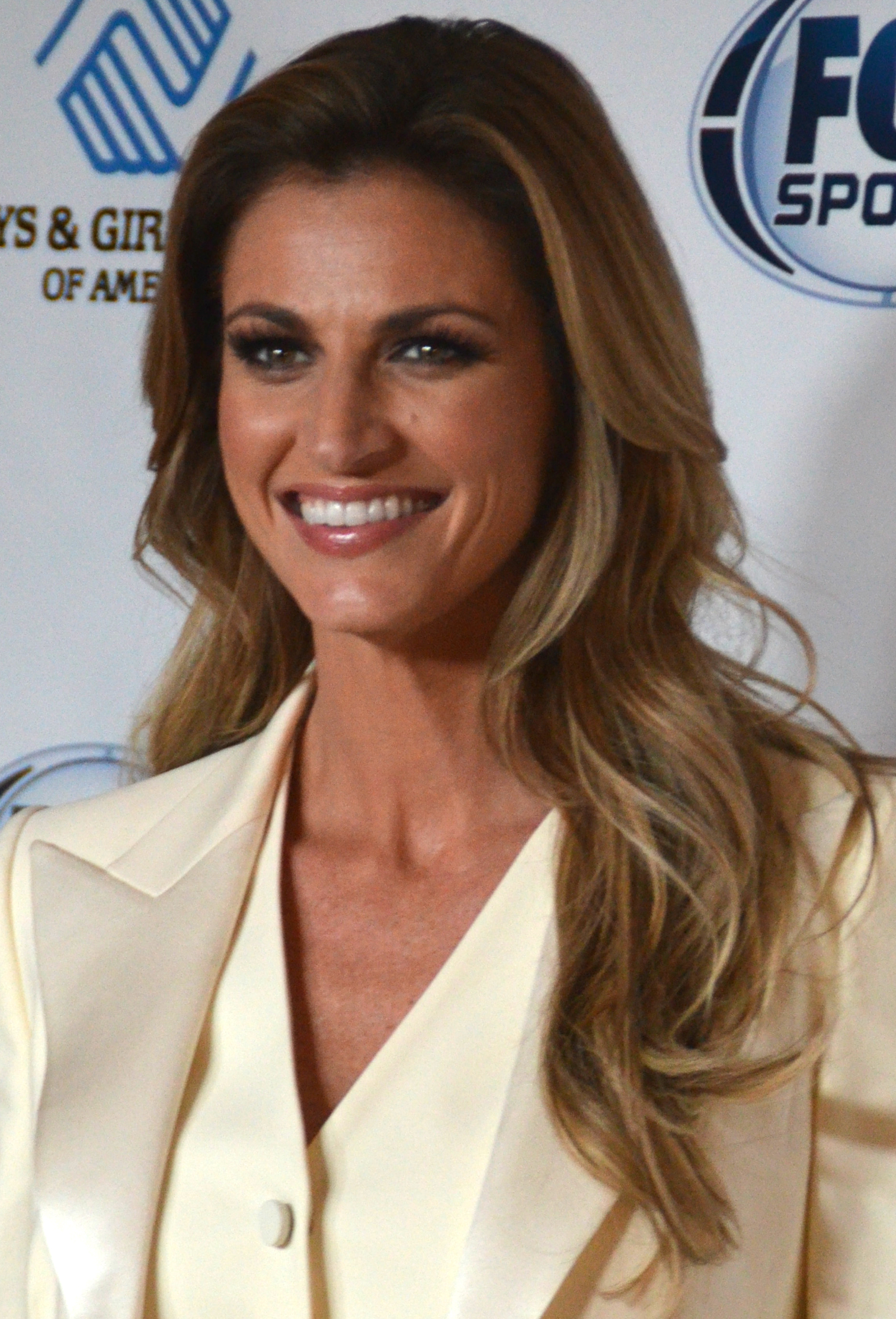
- Andrews in 2014
- Born: Erin Jill Andrews; May 4, 1978 (age 48); Lewiston, Maine, U.S.
- Education: University of Florida (BA)
- Occupations: Sportscaster, television personality
- Years active: 2000–present
- Notable credits: College GameDay co-anchor (2010–2012); Good Morning America correspondent (2010–2012); Dancing with the Stars co-host (2014–2019); NFL on Fox sideline reporter (2014–present); CMT Music Awards co-host (2015–2016)
- Spouse: Jarret Stoll (m. 2017)
- Children: 1

Erin Jill Andrews (born May 4, 1978) is an American sportscaster and television personality. She rose to prominence as a correspondent on the American cable sports channel ESPN after joining the network in 2004. She later joined Fox Sports in 2012 and has since become the lead sideline reporter for the network's NFL broadcasting team. In 2010, she also gained further recognition from placing third on the tenth season of ABC's Dancing with the Stars and eventually co-hosted the show from 2014 to 2019 with Tom Bergeron. She currently co-hosts 99 to Beat, beginning in 2025.

== Early life and family ==
Andrews was born in Lewiston, Maine, to Paula Andrews, a teacher, and Steven Andrews, a broadcast journalist. Her family moved to San Antonio, Texas, when she was five years old, and then to Valrico, Florida, 18 months later, when her father, a six-time Emmy Award winner, began working as an investigative reporter for the local NBC affiliate, WFLA-TV.

Andrews describes herself as a tomboy as a youth, living a life that always revolved around sports, watching NBA games with her father growing up, particularly Boston Celtics games. Andrews cited Hannah Storm, Melissa Stark, Lesley Visser, and Suzy Kolber as female sportscasters she looked up to who ultimately inspired her to become a sportscaster herself.

Andrews attended Bloomingdale High School in Valrico, where she was a member of the dance team, student government, and the National Honor Society. While growing up, she also attended the Brandon School of Dance Arts in Seffner, Florida. Andrews has stated that being a tomboy, she did not have a lot of female friends in high school, opting to hang out with the boys, finding it more enjoyable to discuss sports with them.

Following graduation from high school in 1996, Andrews attended the University of Florida, graduating in 2000 with a Bachelor of Arts (BA) degree in telecommunications. While in college, she was a member of the Zeta Tau Alpha sorority, and the Florida Gators Dazzlers dance team from 1997 to 2000.

== Career ==
=== 2000–2004: Early work ===
In 2000, Andrews was employed by Fox Sports Florida as a freelance reporter. From 2001 to 2002, she served as a Tampa Bay Lightning reporter for the Sunshine Network. From 2002 to 2004, Andrews covered the Atlanta Braves, Atlanta Thrashers, and Atlanta Hawks for the Turner South network as a studio host and reporter.

=== 2004–2012: ESPN ===
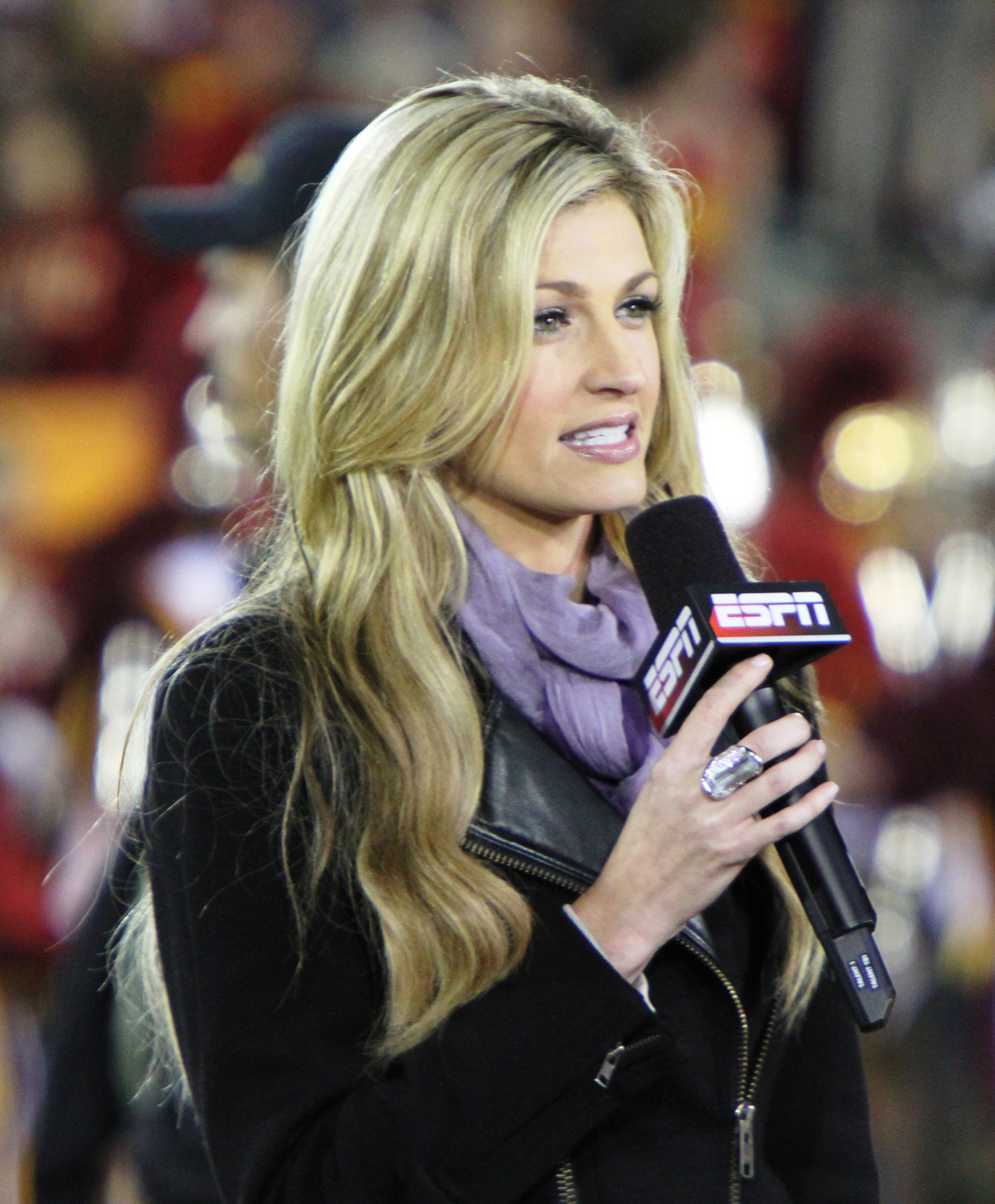
Andrews at a 2010 college football game

Andrews began working for ESPN in April 2004 as a reporter for ESPN National Hockey Night. She has also reported for the College World Series, Little League World Series, and Great Outdoor Games. Andrews began serving as a sideline reporter for ESPN College Football Saturday Primetime and Big Ten college basketball games, and in 2005, her job expanded to include ESPN College Football Thursday Primetime and Major League Baseball sideline reporting. From 2008 to 2010, she reported for ESPN's and ABC's live coverage of the Scripps National Spelling Bee.

In 2010, Andrews competed on the tenth season of ABC's Dancing with the Stars with partner Maksim Chmerkovskiy. They placed third out of 11 couples.

In January 2011, Andrews signed an endorsement deal with Reebok to promote its ZigTech brand. Two weeks prior, as a sideline reporter during the 2011 Rose Bowl, Andrews noted that Texas Christian University Horned Frogs football players were slipping on the turf because of the new Nike shoes they were wearing. Due to the perceived conflict of interest, ESPN announced revised endorsement guidelines for its journalists that required Andrews to end her endorsement deal with Reebok by the end of 2011.

In November 2011, former ESPN executive Keith Clinkscales filed suit against ESPN Vice President Joan Lynch, claiming she had falsely alleged Clinkscales had masturbated while sitting next to Andrews on an airplane flight earlier that year. Andrews was reported to have disclosed the incident to a number of people but chose not to pursue the matter with ESPN's HR department because she was still shaken by public disclosure of her stalking experiences.

Andrews hosted the first hour of ESPN's College GameDay on ESPNU, and had been a Good Morning America correspondent on ABC since 2010, though she had not appeared on the show since covering the Oscars in February 2011.

=== 2012–present: Fox Sports and host roles ===
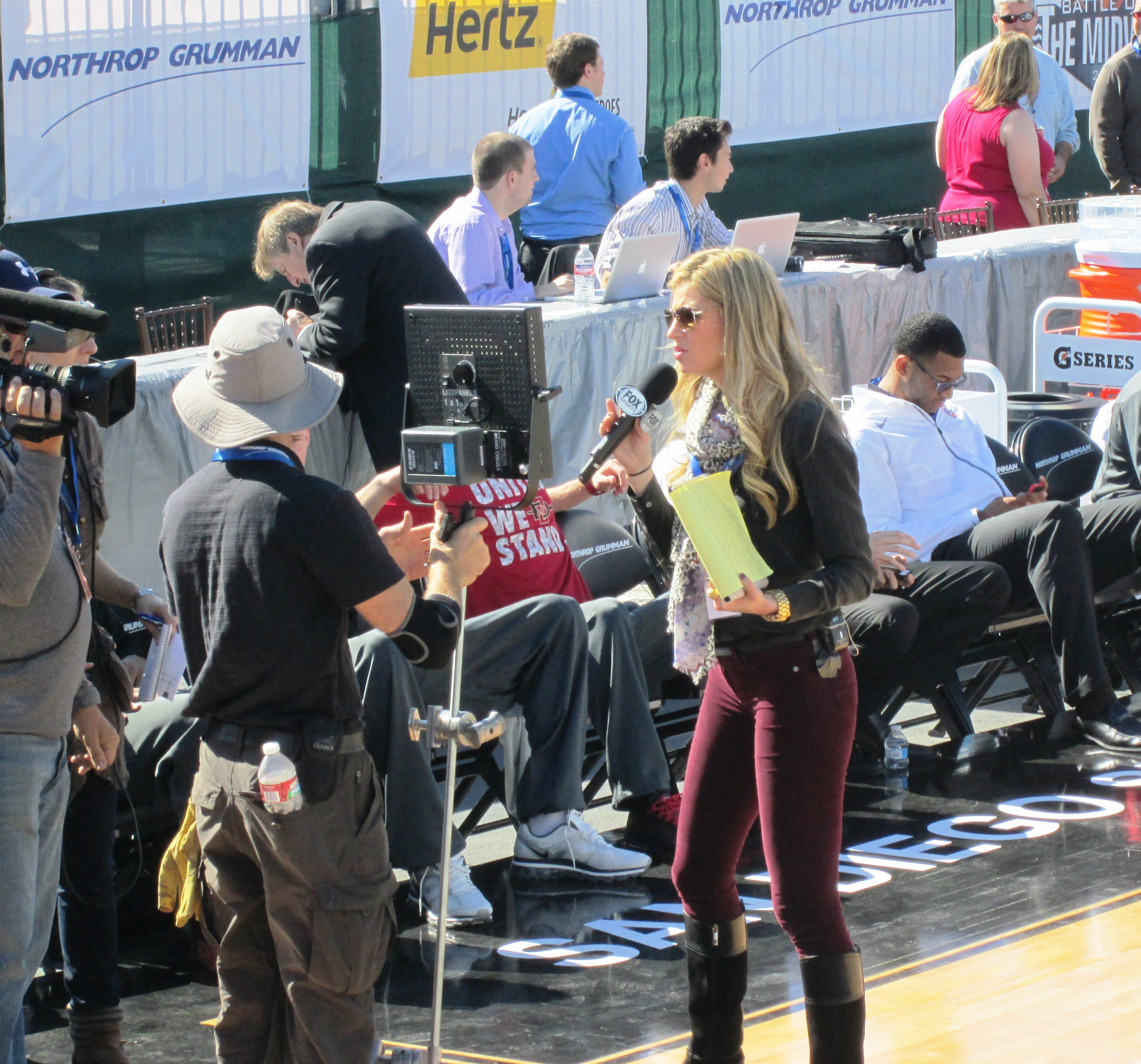
Andrews reporting for Fox Sports on the deck of USS Midway (CV-41) in November 2012

On June 29, 2012, it was announced that Andrews was leaving ESPN to join Fox Sports. She was the first host of Fox College Football's studio show and was joined by analysts Eddie George and Joey Harrington. Andrews also became a contributor on Fox NFL Sunday and served as a field reporter for most major sporting events aired on Fox, such as the MLB All-Star Game, the World Series, the NFL Playoffs, and Daytona 500. With the launch of Fox Sports 1 on August 17, 2013, Andrews became the guest host of Fox College Football Kickoff and Fox College Saturday, a direct competitor to ESPN College Gameday, which previews the weekend's biggest college football games. Andrews also contributed to the daily studio show Fox Football Daily. Beginning with the 2014 NFL season, Andrews became the sideline reporter on Fox's lead NFL broadcasting crew after replacing Pam Oliver. She later re-signed with Fox Sports in 2016 to report exclusively with Fox's NFL crew.

In March 2014, Andrews replaced Brooke Burke-Charvet as co-host of Dancing with the Stars, joining Tom Bergeron for the show's 18th season. She and Bergeron remained in their roles through the show's 28th season.

Andrews has also co-hosted the CMT Music Awards twice, having hosted the 2015 ceremony with actress Brittany Snow on June 10 and the 2016 ceremony with NFL player J. J. Watt on June 8.

She co-hosts the Calm Down podcast with Charissa Thompson since 2021.

In 2025, she became a co-host of 99 to Beat, co-hosting with stand-up comedian and actor Ken Jeong. It aired on Fox on September 24, 2025.

== Endorsements and charitable work ==
Andrews became a spokesperson for the Kraft Foods Huddle to Fight Hunger campaign in 2010, which raised $2.86 million for Feeding America.

In October 2011, Andrews teamed up with StubHub, the world's largest online ticket marketplace, to launch a new national campaign called Girls Night Out.

In May 2013, she co-hosted the Music Builds: CMT Disaster Relief Concert on the CMT network to raise money for the American Red Cross in response to the April 27 tornadoes in Oklahoma.

At the beginning of the 2014 National Football League season, Andrews was named the new face of CoverGirl and partnered with the cosmetic company for the new #Gameface contest, which the winner would be entered to win a pair of tickets to the 2015 Super Bowl.

Andrews became an Orangetheory Fitness ambassador in October 2016.

In October 2019, Fanatics teamed up with Andrews on a line of clothing.

== Personal life ==
Andrews previously lived in Atlanta, Georgia, but now lives in Los Angeles, California. She was voted "America's sexiest sportscaster" in 2007 and 2008 by Playboy magazine. She began a relationship with professional hockey player Jarret Stoll in December 2012. The couple were engaged in December 2016 and married on June 24, 2017.

In January 2017, Andrews announced that she had been diagnosed with cervical cancer in September 2016 for which she received treatment. After two surgeries, she was pronounced cancer-free. At the time of her diagnosis, Andrews and Stoll had not discussed marriage or having children, but she says it put their relationship on the fast track. Andrews and Stoll pursued in-vitro fertilization (IVF). Andrews' son was born in July 2023 via surrogacy.

After defeating cancer and informing the public of her experience, she partnered with a women's health diagnostics company, Hologic, to launch a campaign. The campaign, called We Can Change This STAT encourages women to go to the doctor for their annual exams, as well as getting men to encourage the women in their lives to take their exams.

Andrews owns a woman-focused sports apparel brand, WEAR, which she founded in 2019.

=== Stalking incident ===
In 2008, Michael David Barrett, then 46, filmed Andrews in her hotel room through peepholes at the Nashville Marriott adjacent to Vanderbilt University in Nashville, Tennessee, and the Radisson Airport hotel in Milwaukee, Wisconsin. On July 16, 2009, one of these videos, in which Andrews appeared totally nude, was posted online and quickly went viral. Barrett was arrested by the FBI on October 2, 2009, for interstate stalking, and pleaded guilty to the charges on December 15, 2009. A second tape of Andrews was discovered on Barrett's computer showing her nude in her room at the Radisson in Milwaukee. This tape was never made public. On March 15, 2010, Barrett was sentenced to two and a half years in prison, three years of probation, $5,000 in fines, and $7,366 in restitution. He served his sentence at the Seattle Community Correctional Center and was released on July 3, 2012.

Andrews sued Barrett, Marriott International, Radisson Hotels, and five other entities for negligence and invasion of privacy in connection with the videotaping. In her lawsuit against Marriott, Andrews alleged that hotel employees disclosed the dates of her stay to Barrett and assigned him a room next to hers. In 2011, Andrews worked with U.S. Senator Amy Klobuchar to enact a new federal anti-stalking law. Andrews was still trying to have the video removed from the Internet in July 2011.

In March 2013, Andrews's lawyers filed a motion in Los Angeles Superior Court seeking to quash a subpoena from Marriott "seeking her payroll records, contracts, performance reviews, any disciplinary reports, as well as other employment information from her current employer, Fox." The attorneys said that Marriott is also seeking "physician letters, notes, annual physicals, and other related medical records" and that the request was an attempt to "harass and embarrass" Andrews.

In October 2015, Andrews filed a suit against the Nashville Marriott and Barrett for $75 million. Jury selection for the hearing began on February 22, 2016. On March 7, 2016, after a two-week trial, the jury awarded Andrews $55 million. The jury found Barrett 51% responsible and the hotel management company (Windsor Capital Group) and its owner (West End Hotel Partners) 49% responsible. As of early 2016, Barrett was living in his father's basement. During the trial, Andrews testified that her employer ESPN would not allow her to return to broadcasting until she had spoken publicly about the incident on television, against her will, due to rumors it was a publicity stunt.

== See also ==
- List of people from Maine
