= University of Florida College of Health and Human Performance =

School at the University of Florida

College of Health and Human Performance
- Type: Public
- Established: 1946
- Parent institution: University of Florida
- Dean: Michael Reid
- Students: 2,900
- Location: Gainesville, Florida, United States; 29°38′57.5″N 82°20′50.2″W
- Website: hhp.ufl.edu

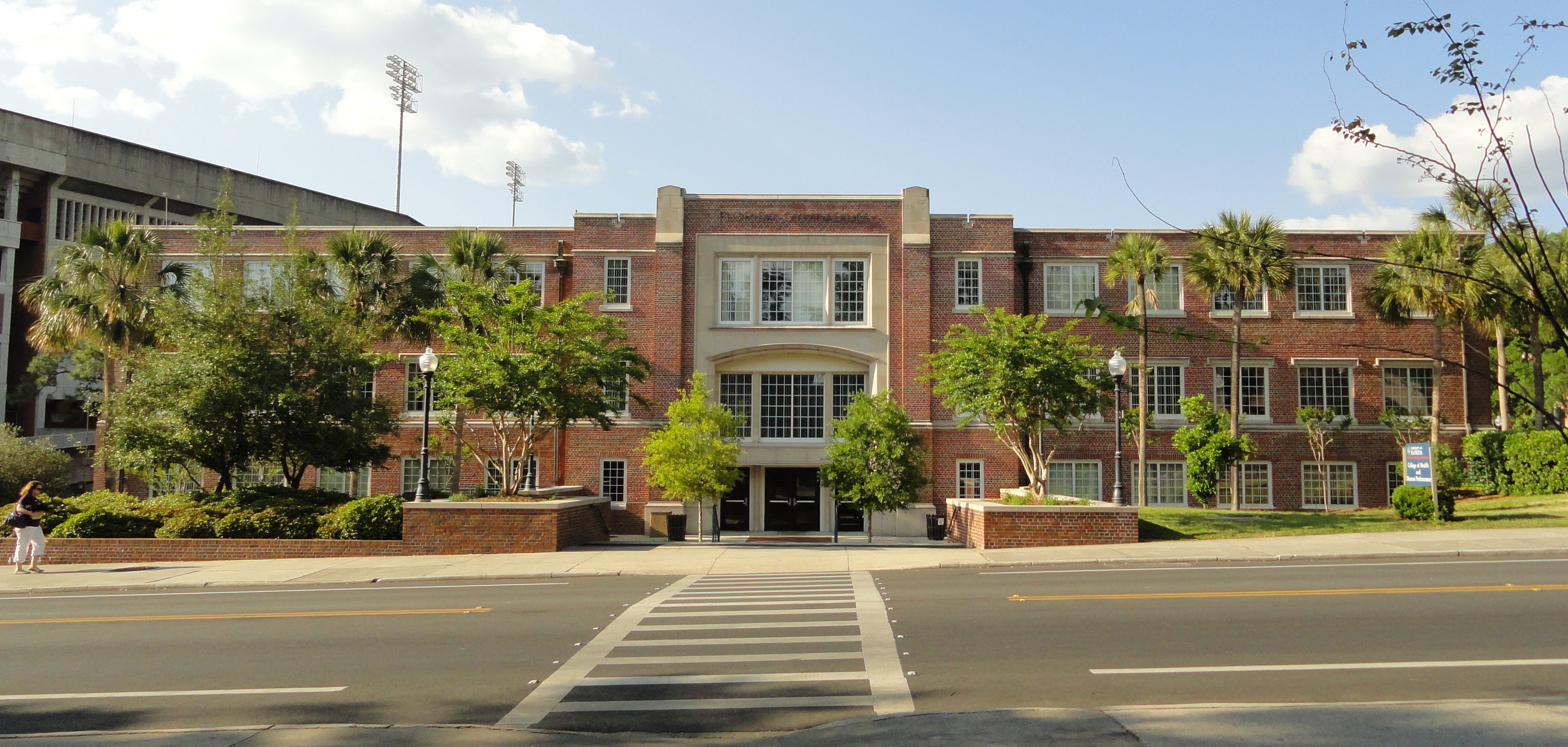
Florida Gymnasium, primary office and classroom building for the College of Health and Human Performance.

The College of Health and Human Performance is an academic division of the University of Florida.

The College of Health and Human Performance was founded in 1946 and is located on the university's Gainesville, Florida campus. The college has four departments and four research centers. The college is unique in that the majors that are offered are inter-disciplinary in nature. As of 2021, there were more than 2,900 undergraduate and graduate students enrolled in the college. In 2024, the College of Health and Human Performance generated $13.5 million in research expenditures.

== Departments ==
- Applied Physiology and Kinesiology
- Health Education and Behavior
- Sport Management
- Tourism, Hospitality and Event Management

== Deans of the College of Health and Human Performance ==
Years	Dean
1946–1970	Dennis K. Stanley
1970–1986	C.A. Boyd
1986–2003	Patrick J. Bird
2003–2006	Jill Varnes
2006–2012	Steve Dorman
(Interim) 2012–2013	Kelli Brown
2013–present	Michael B. Reid
