= List of University of Florida buildings =

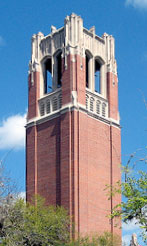
Century Tower

The University of Florida is the flagship university in the State University System of Florida and has many notable buildings located in cities including Gainesville, Jacksonville, and Orlando. The Campus Historic District at the University of Florida comprises 32 contributing properties that are registered with the National Register of Historic Places. As is typical in the United States, most of the university's oldest buildings were designed in the Collegiate Gothic architectural style; since the 1950s, Brutalist and Modern styles have been extensively employed. The university has over 900 buildings on the main campus (about 170 have classrooms).

The University of Florida campus encompasses over 2,000 acres (8.1 km^{2}). The campus is home to many notable structures, including Century Tower, a 157-foot-tall (48 m) carillon tower in the center of the campus historic district.

== Buildings and historic photos ==
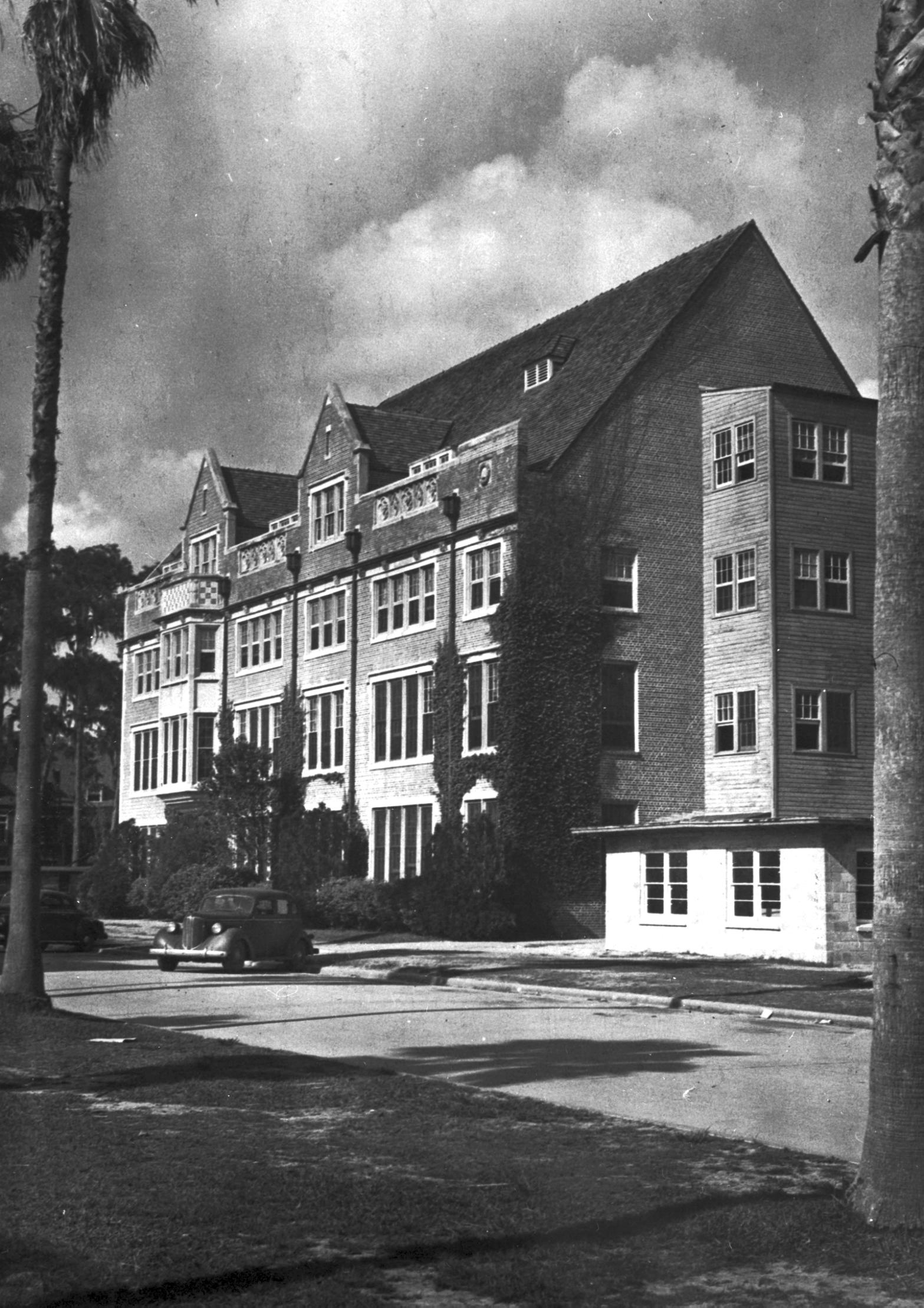
Rolfs Hall

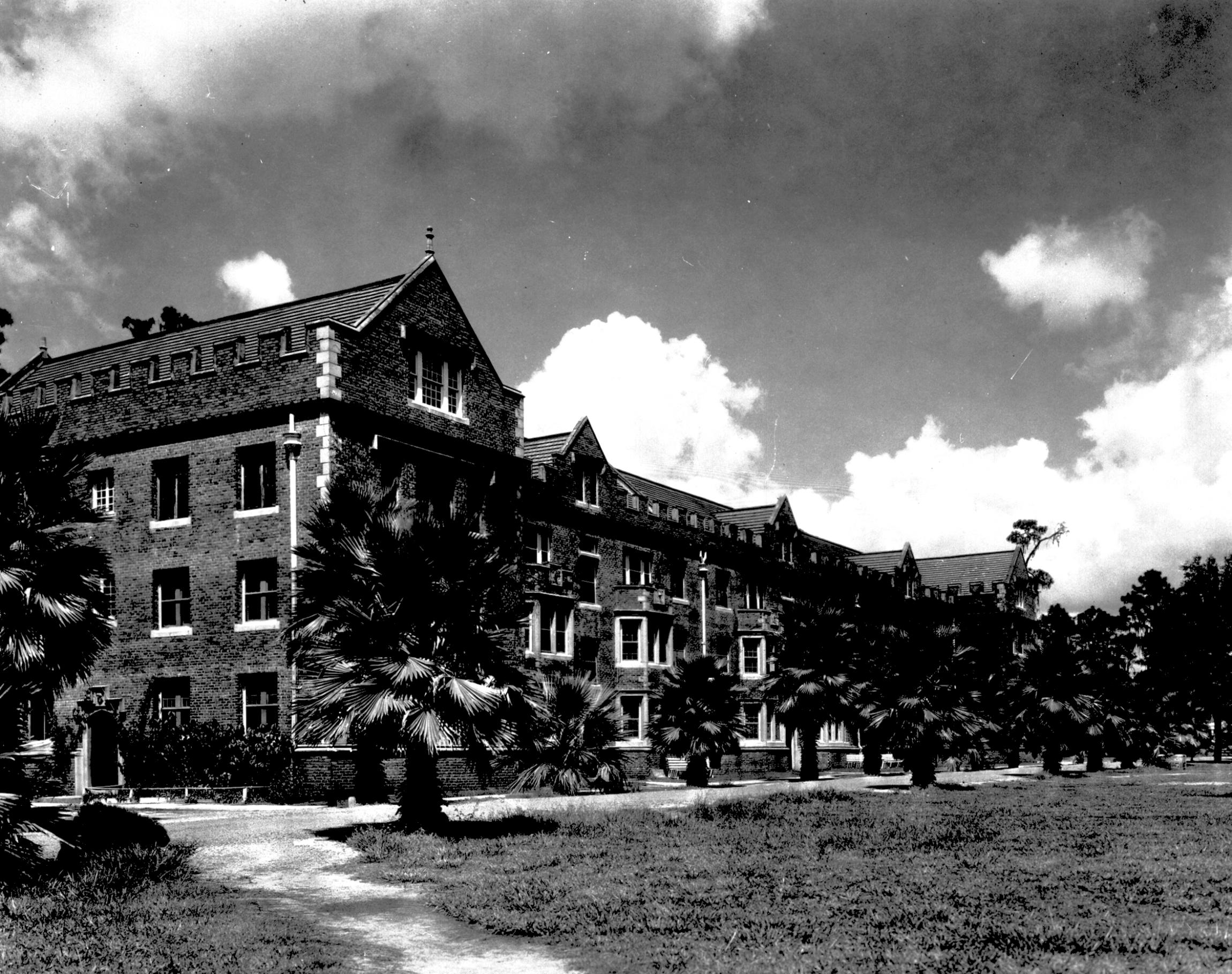
Buckman Hall

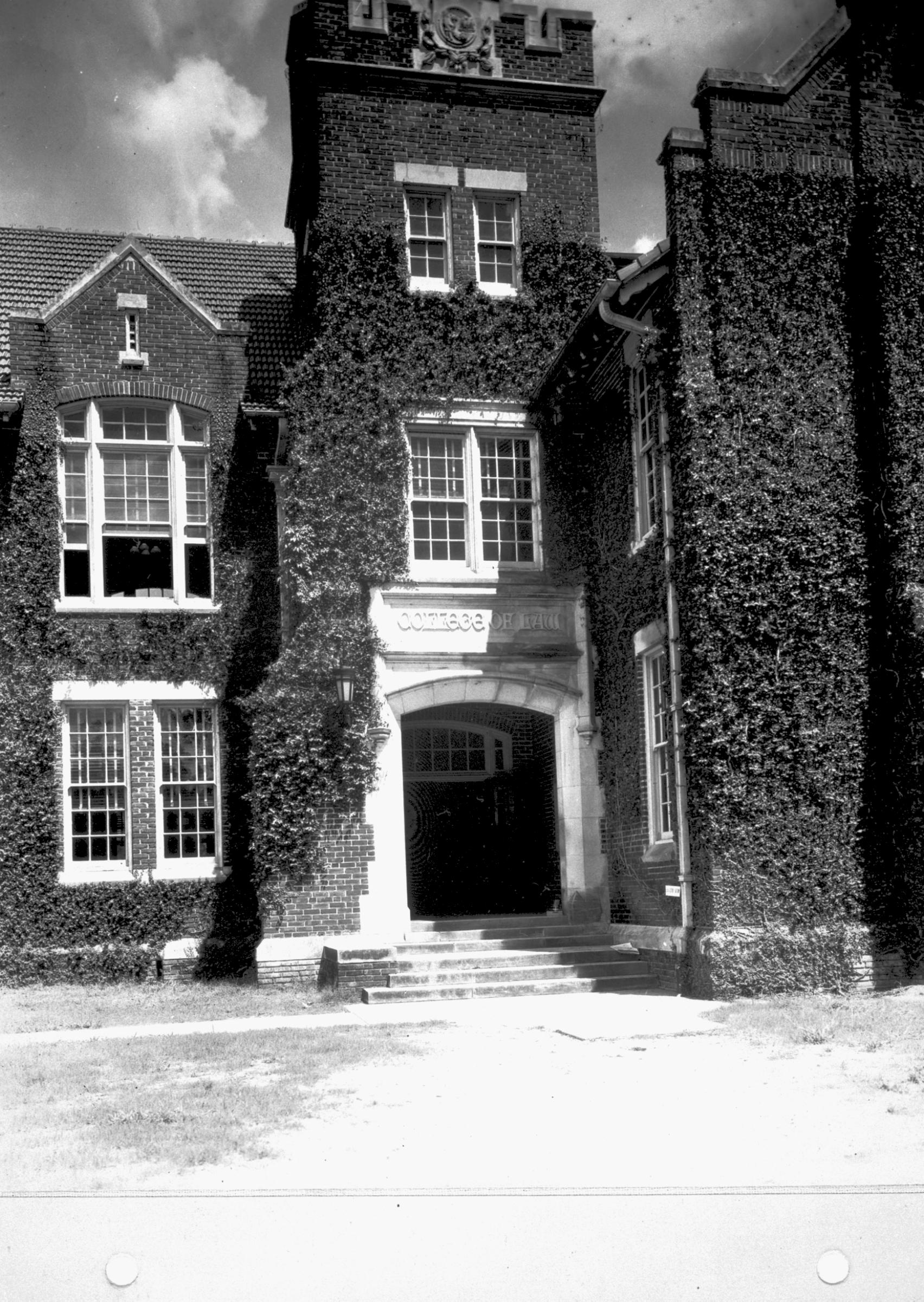
Bryan Hall

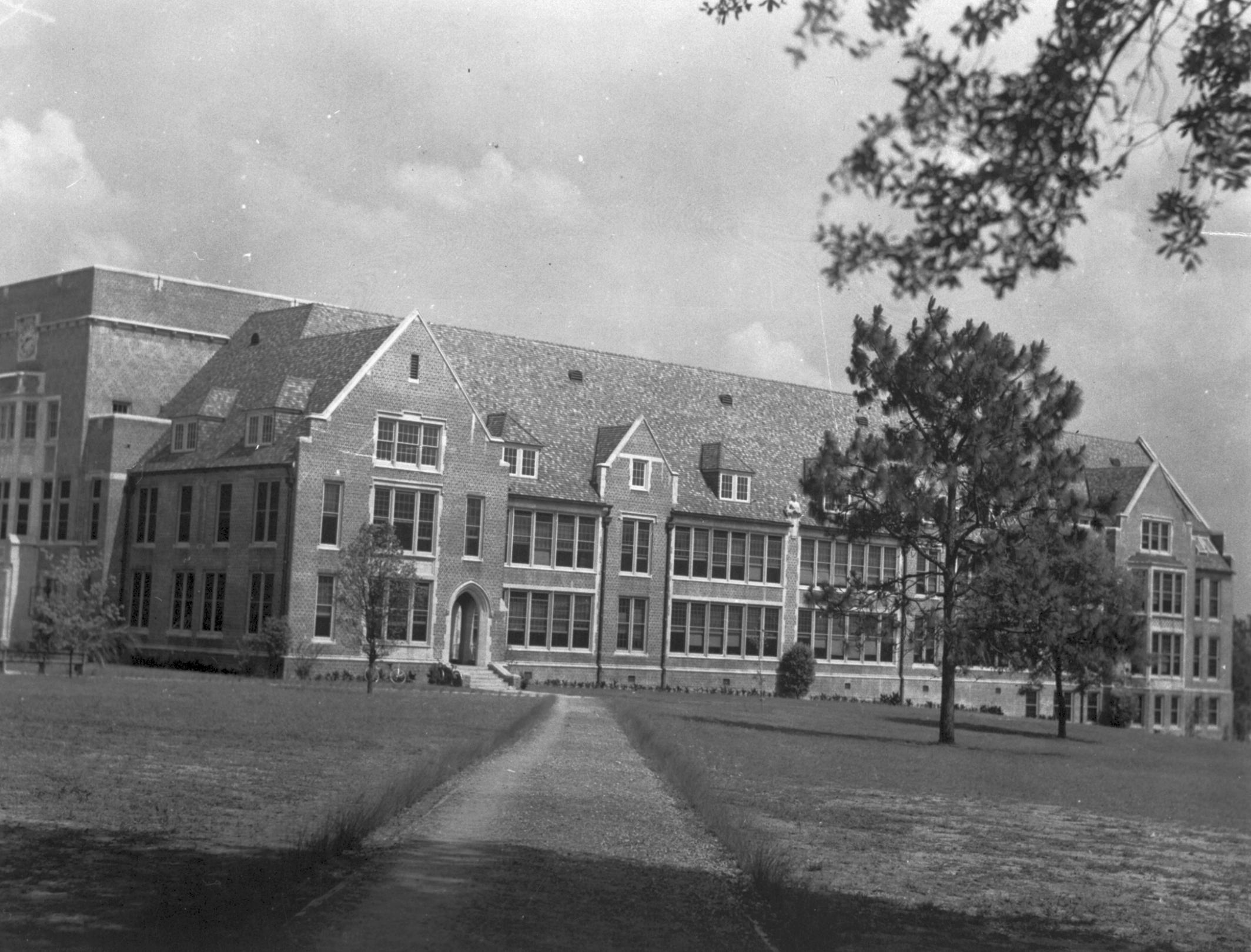
Norman Hall

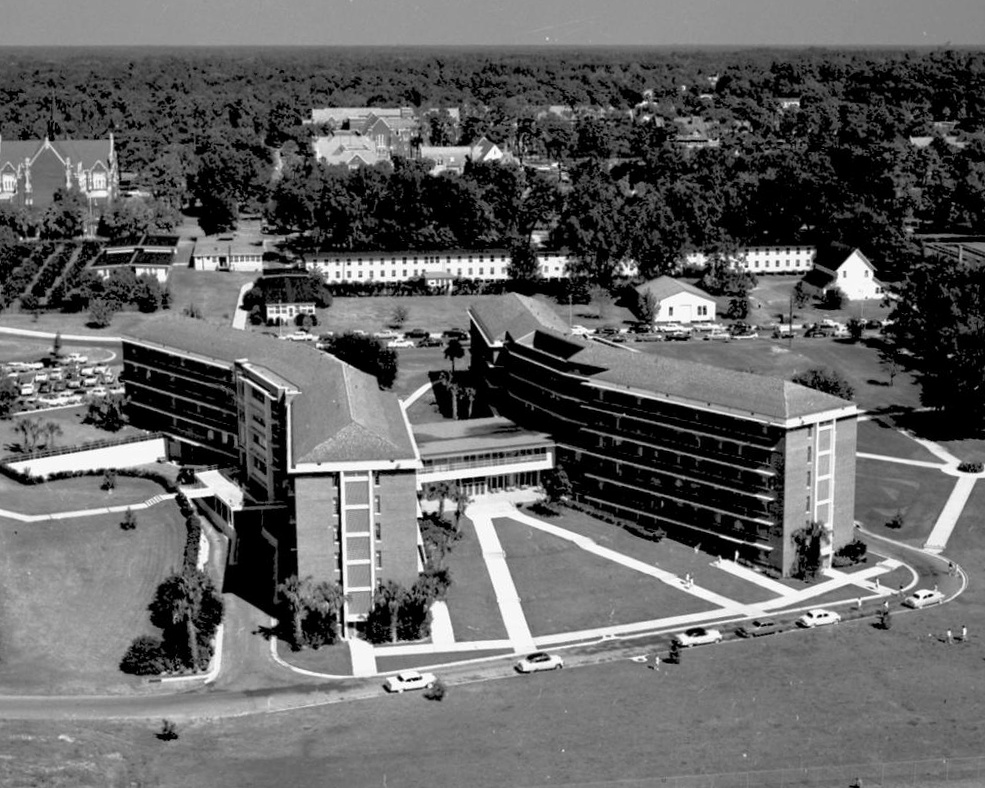
Broward Hall

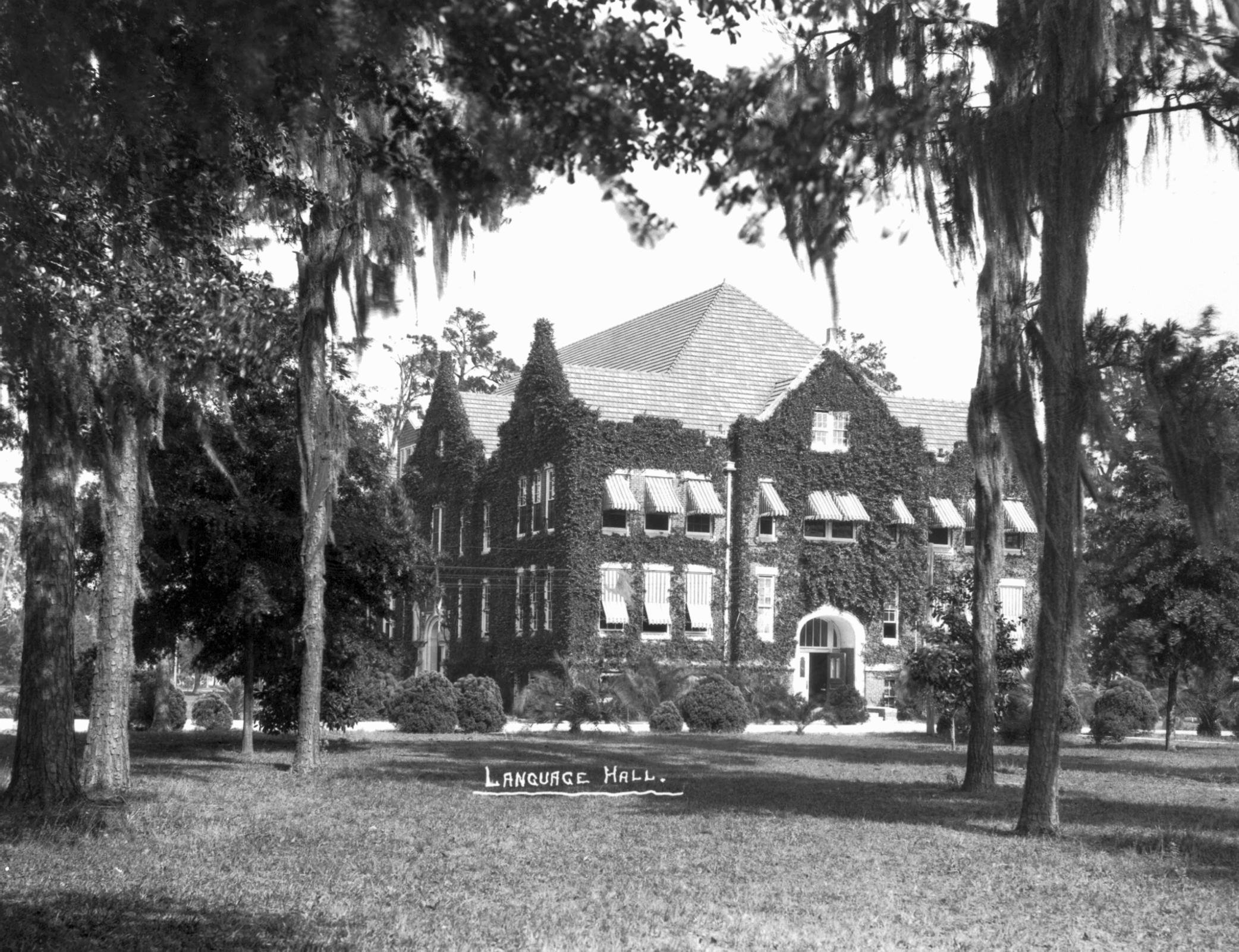
Anderson Hall

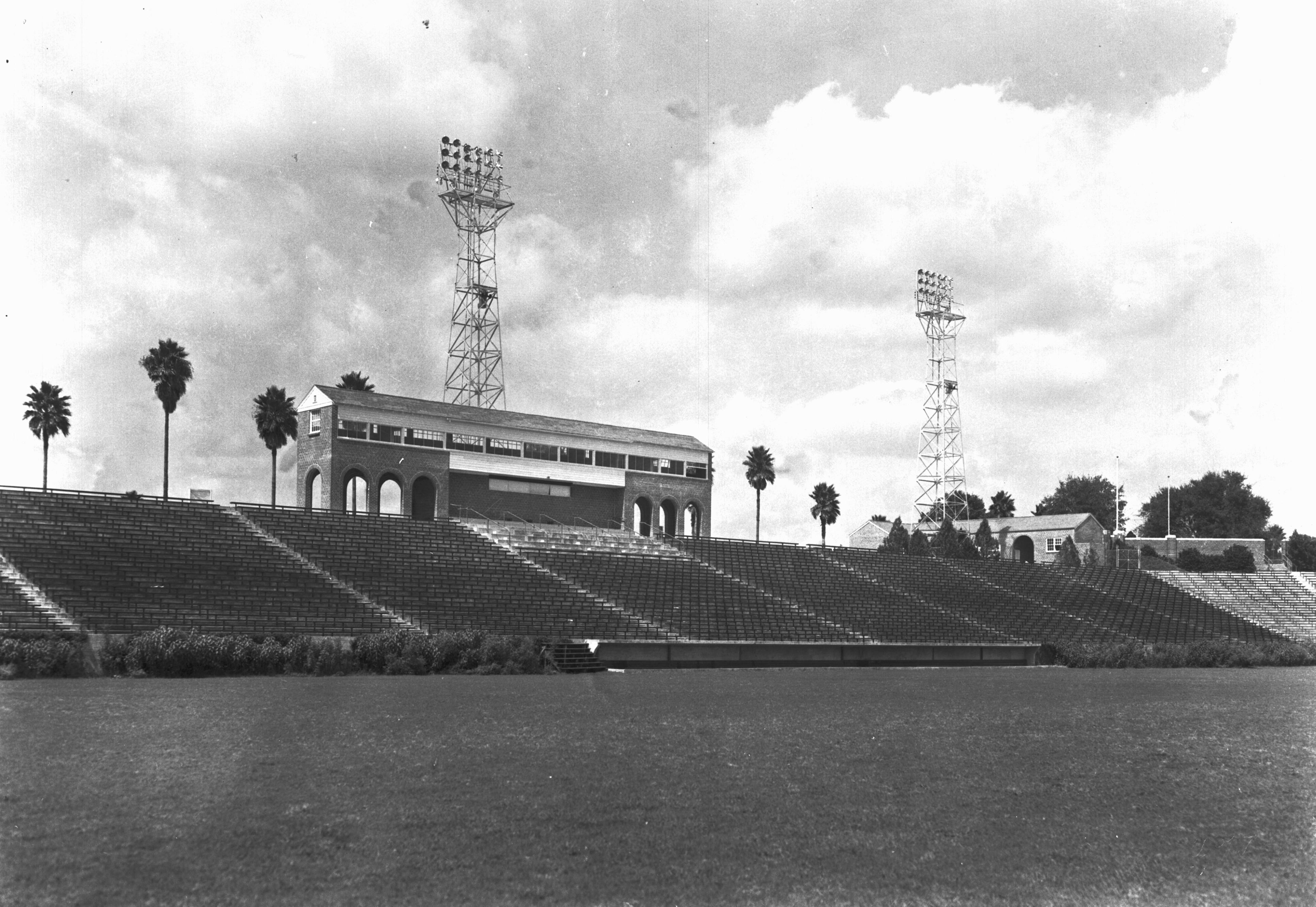
Steve Spurrier-Florida Field at Ben Hill Griffin Stadium

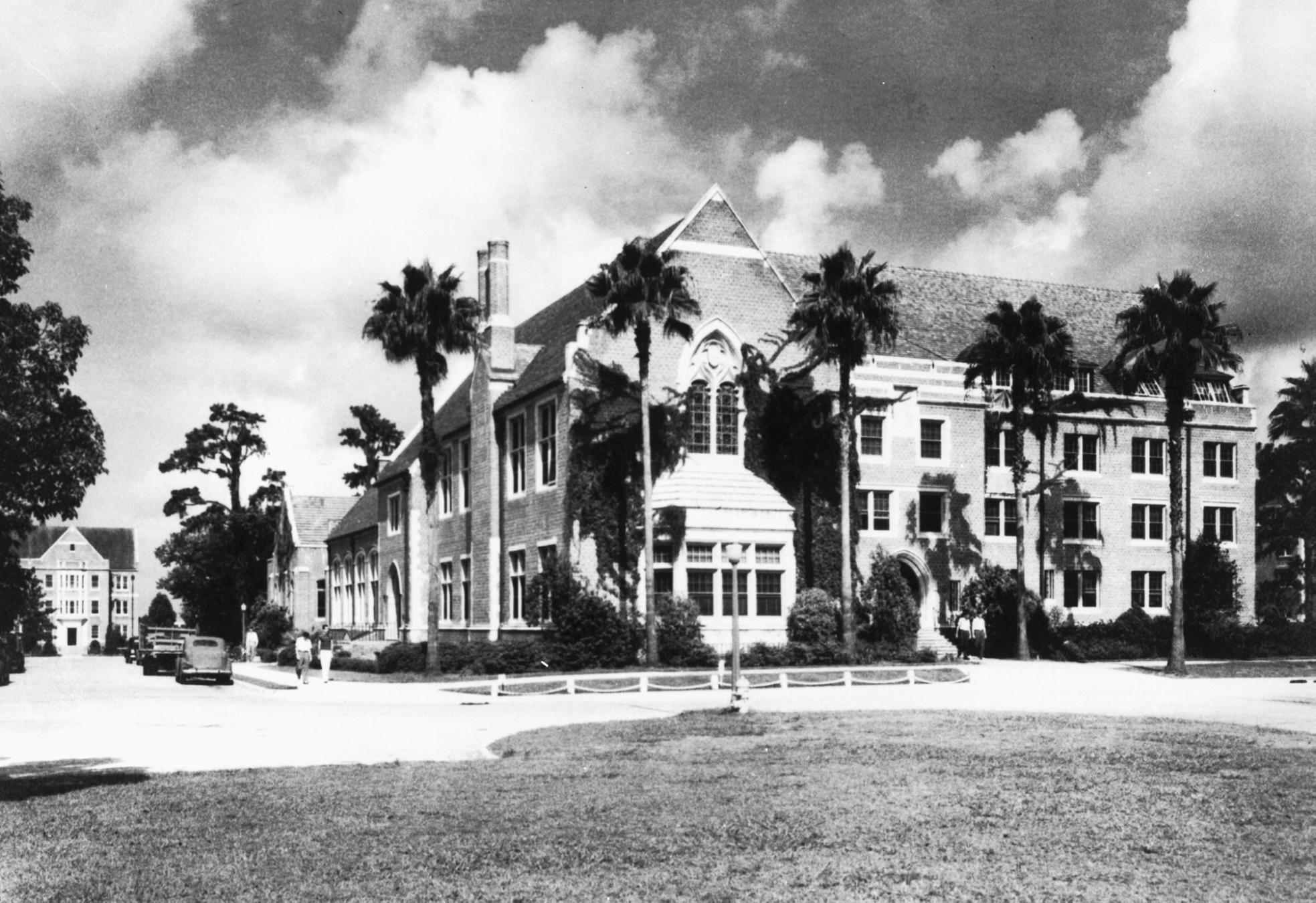
Dauer Hall

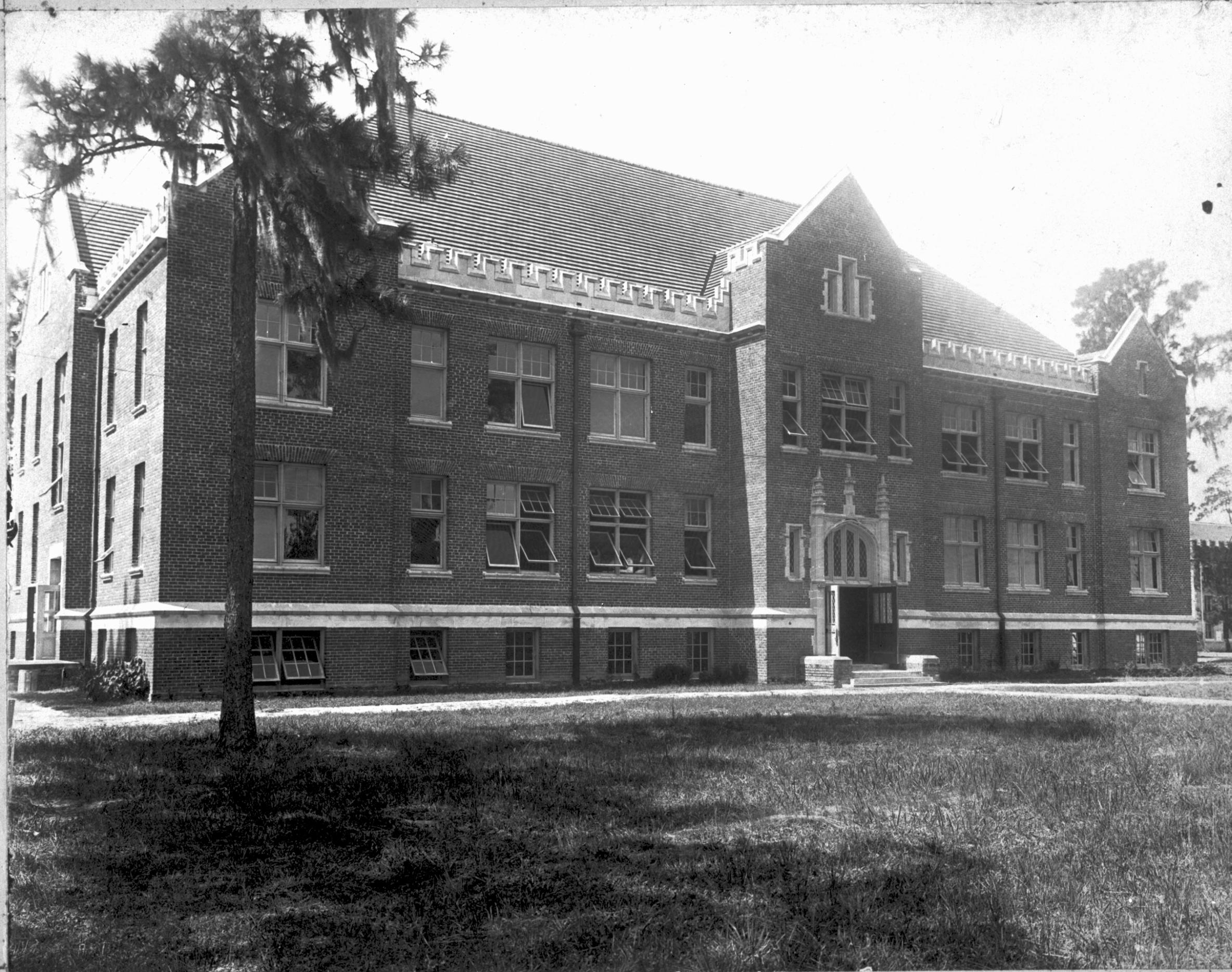
Flint Hall

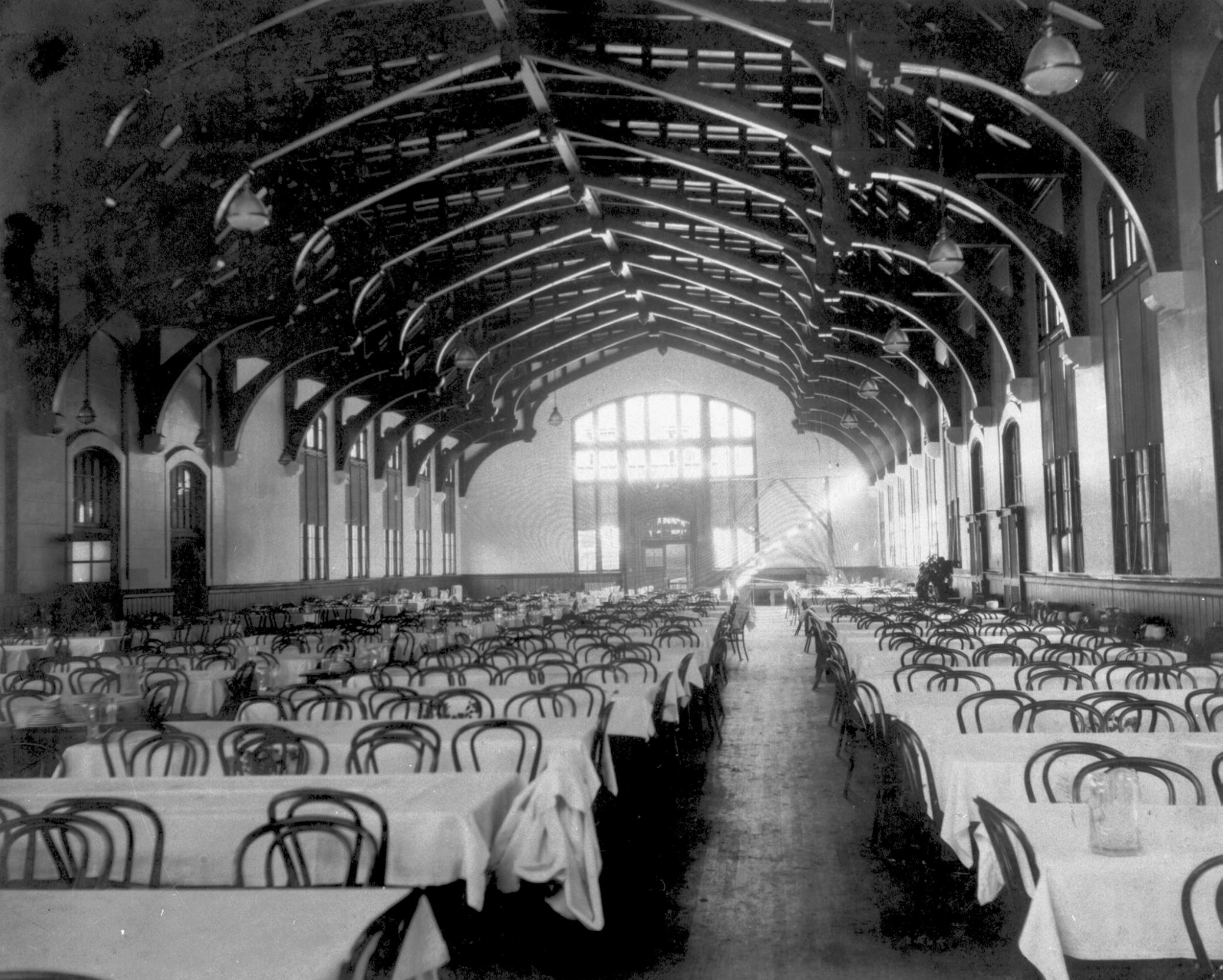
Inside Johnson Hall

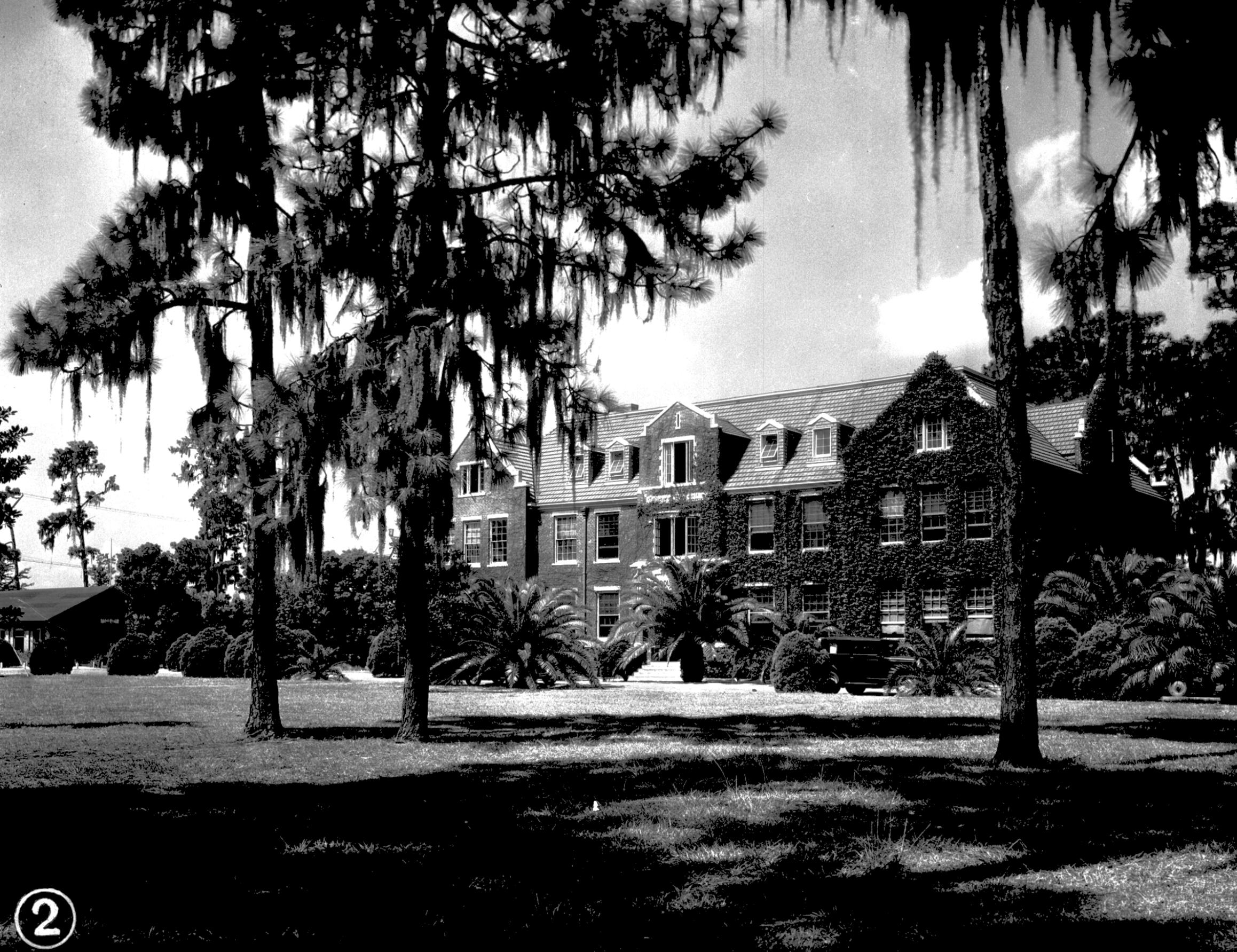
Griffin-Floyd Hall

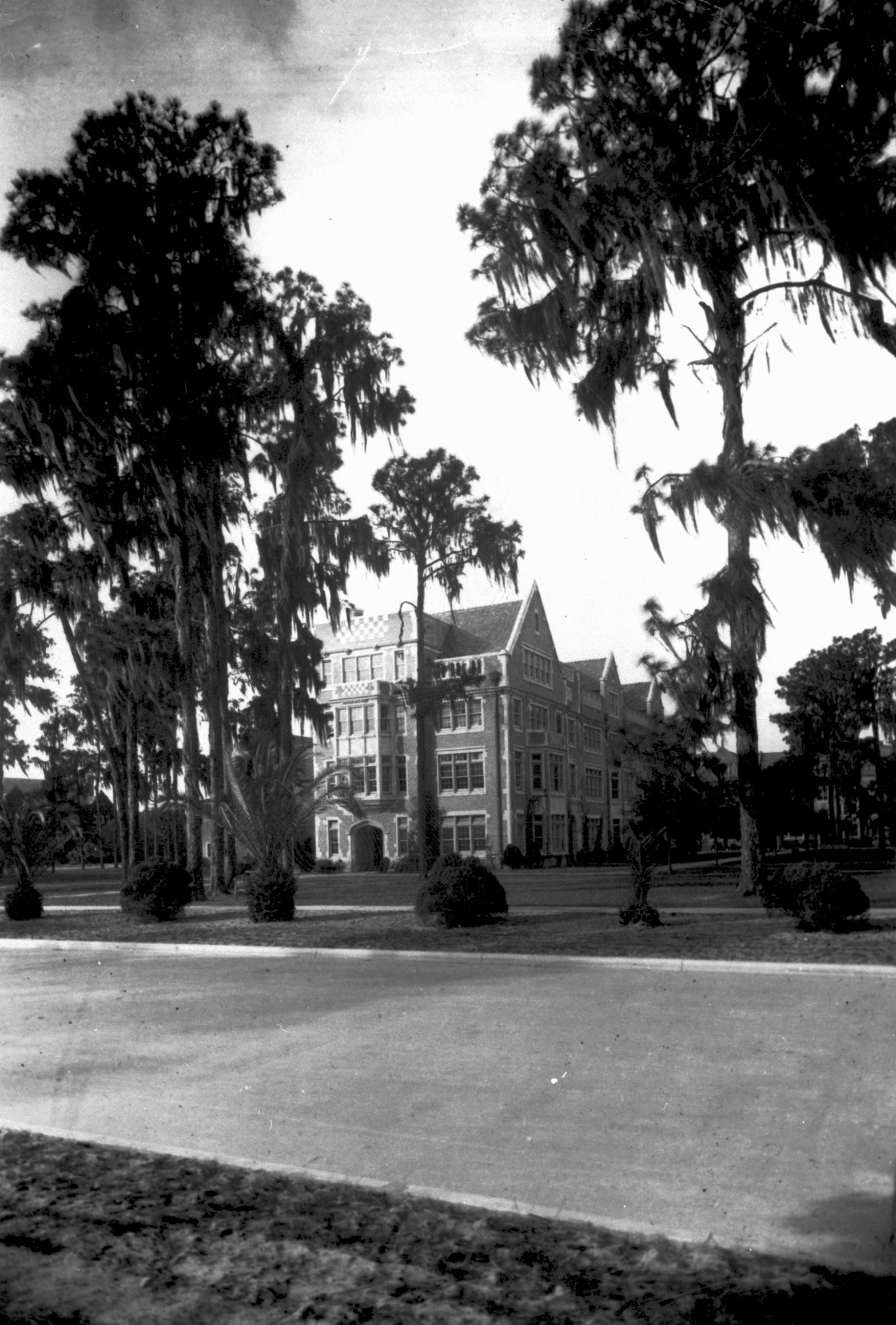
Leigh Hall

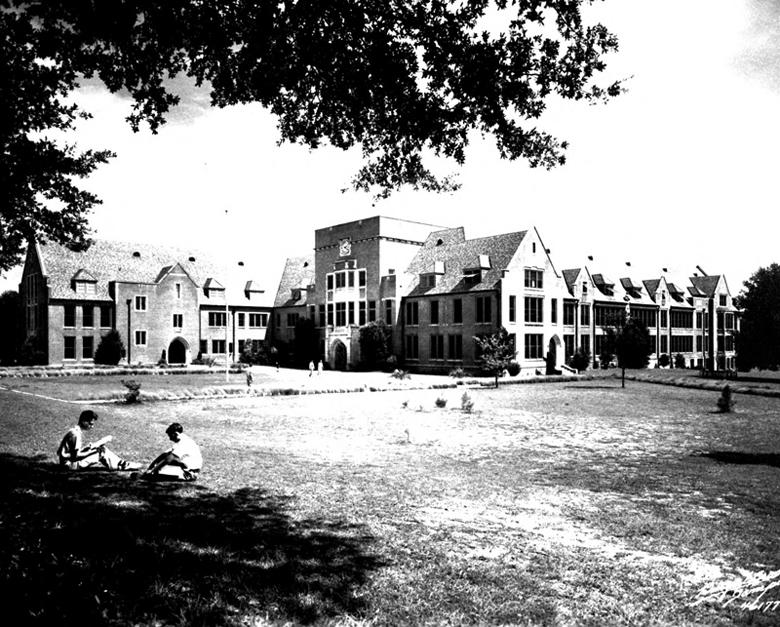
Norman Area

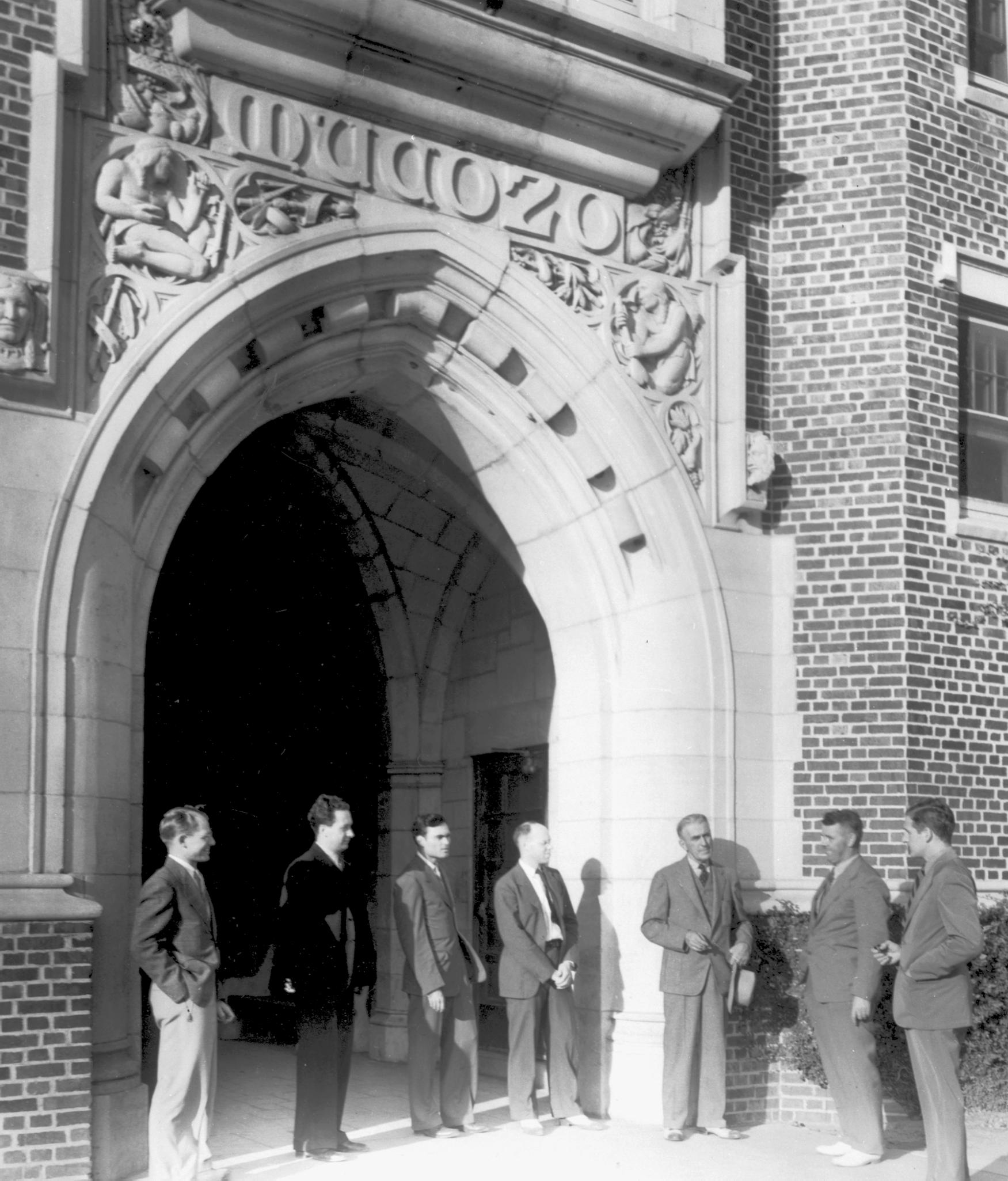
Sledd Hall

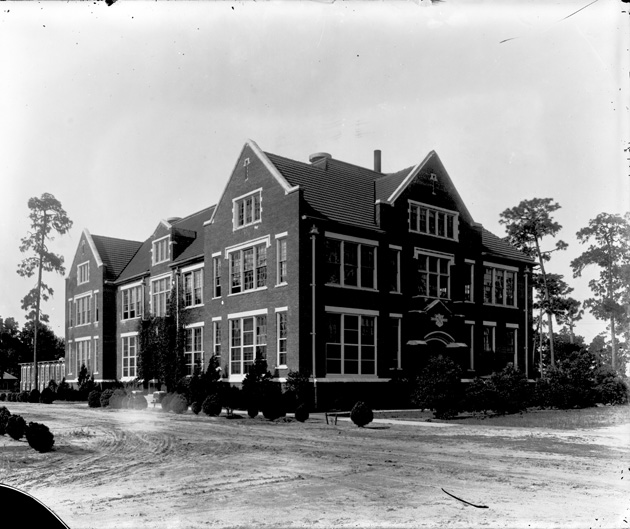
Benton Hall

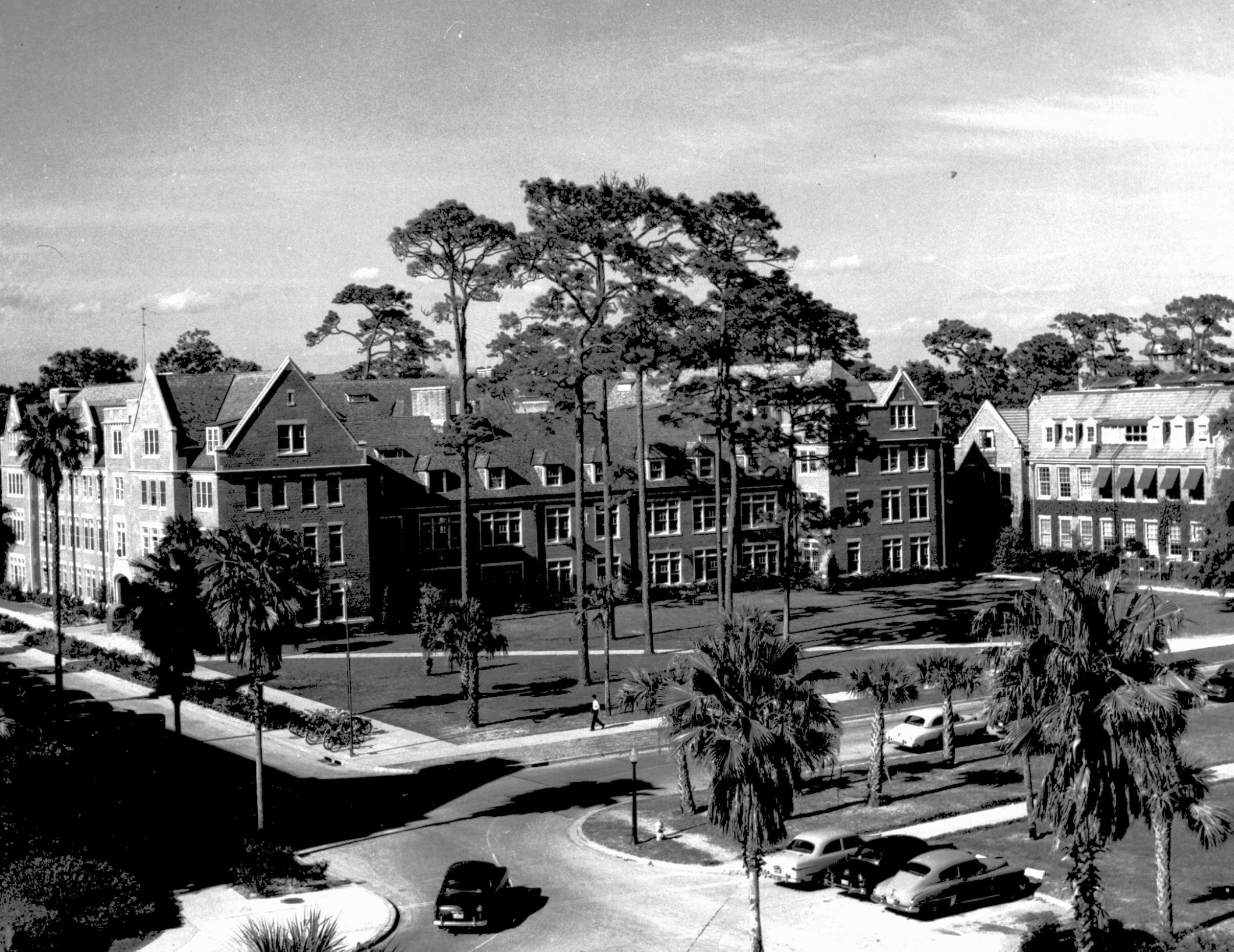
University of Florida Campus

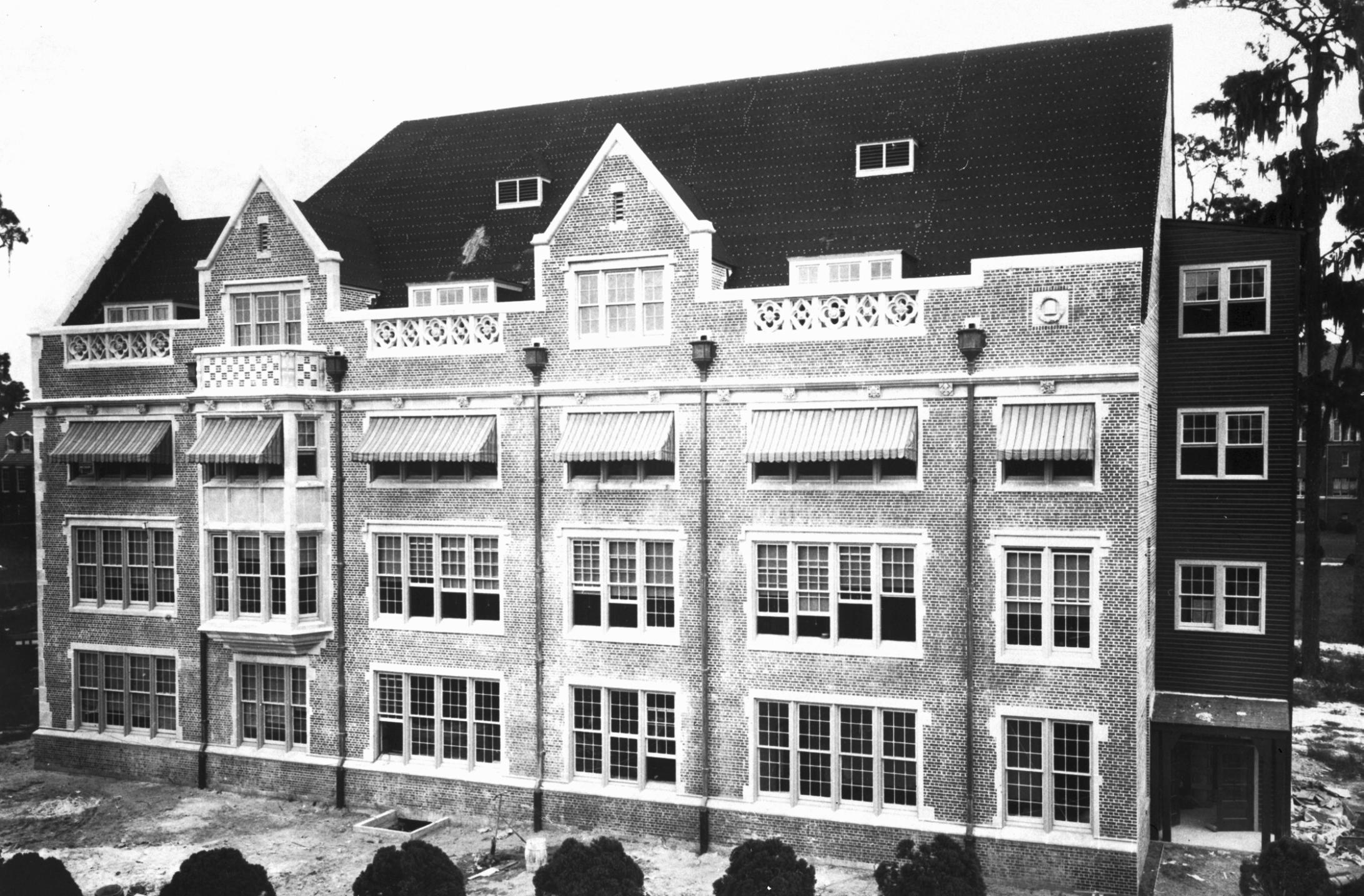
Rolfs Hall

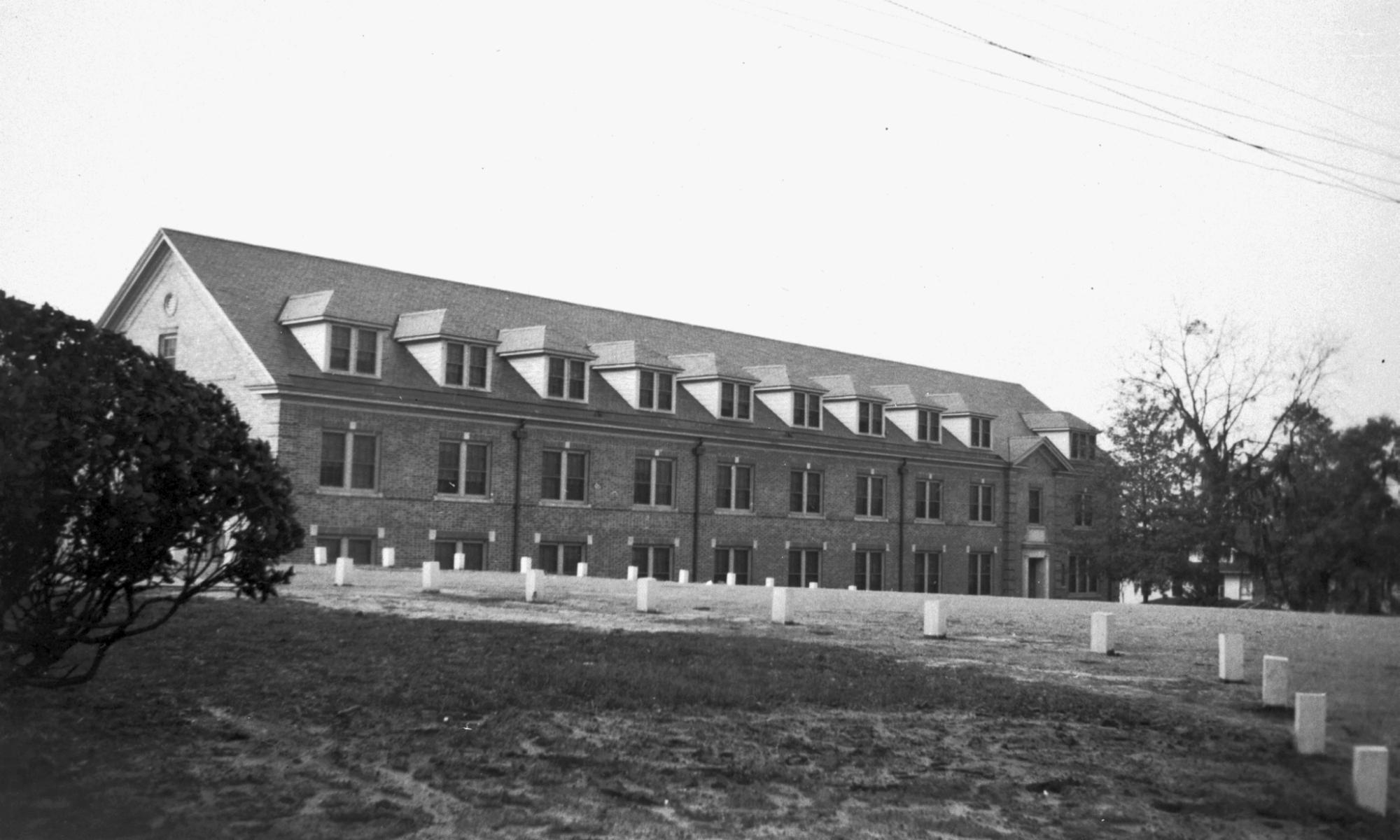
Historic Dormitory

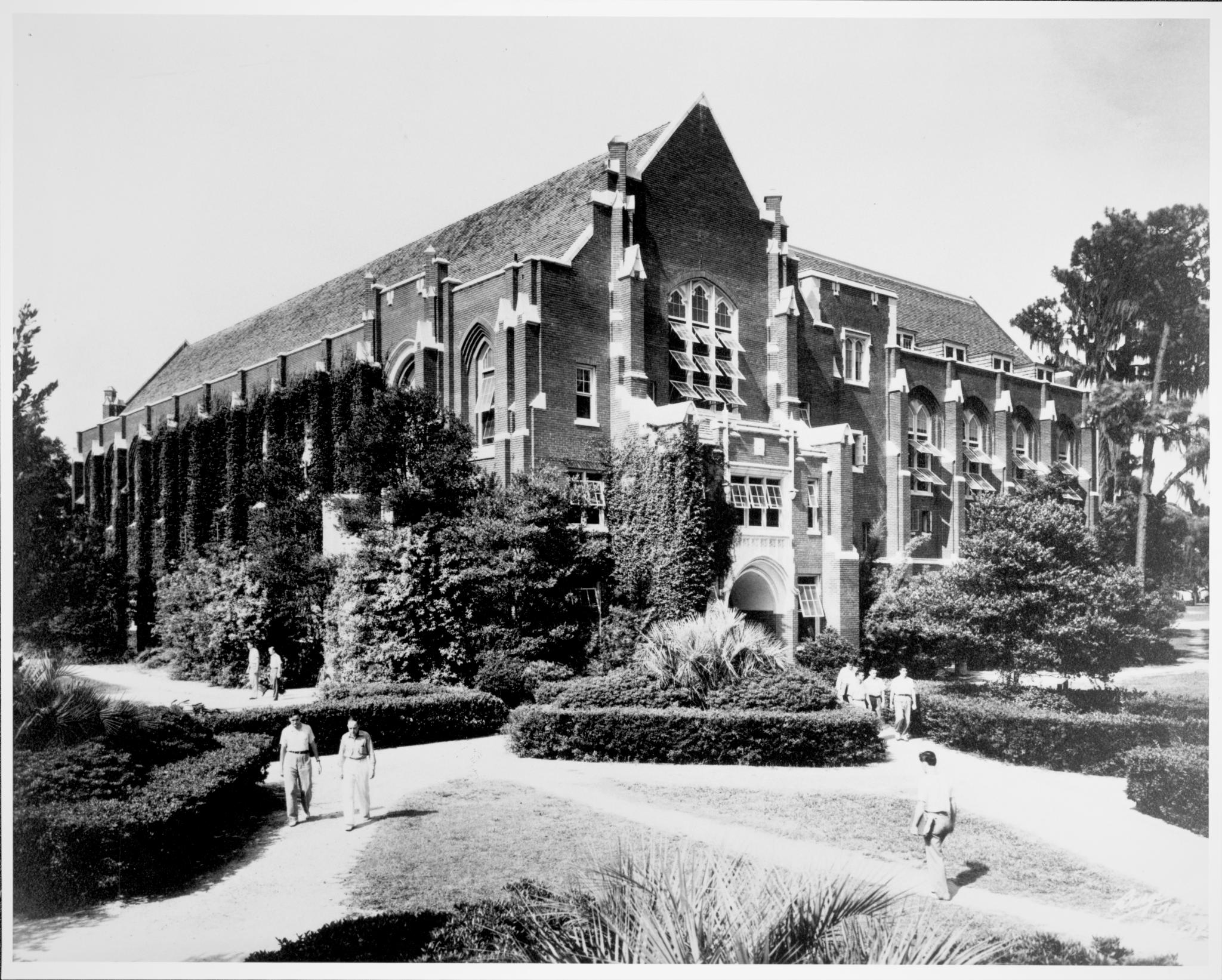
Smathers Library

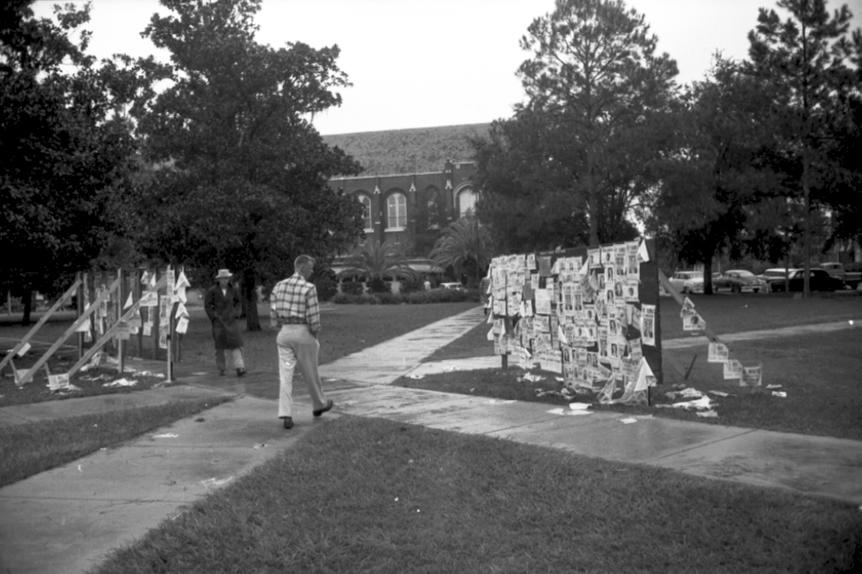
Plaza of the Americas

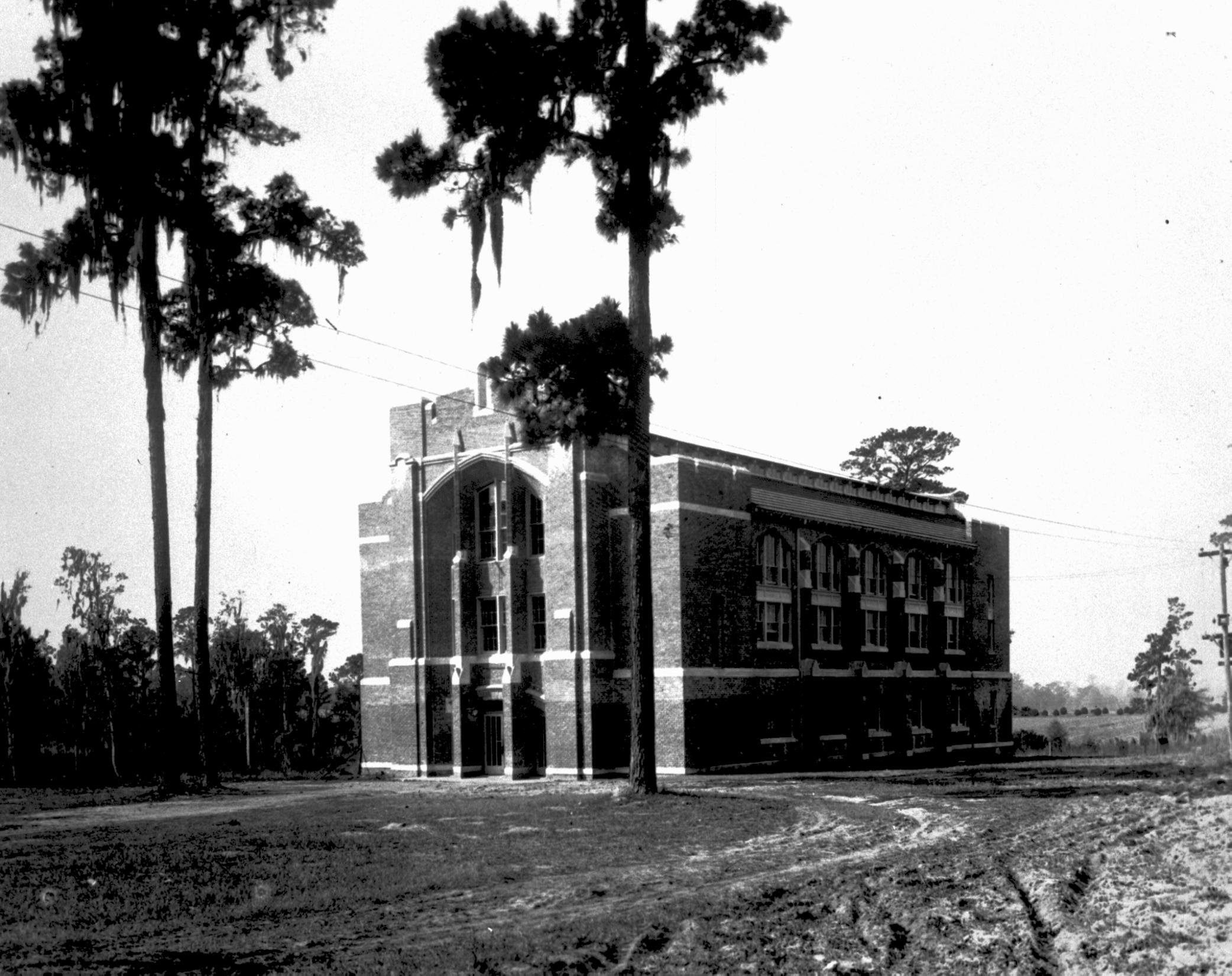
Ustler Hall

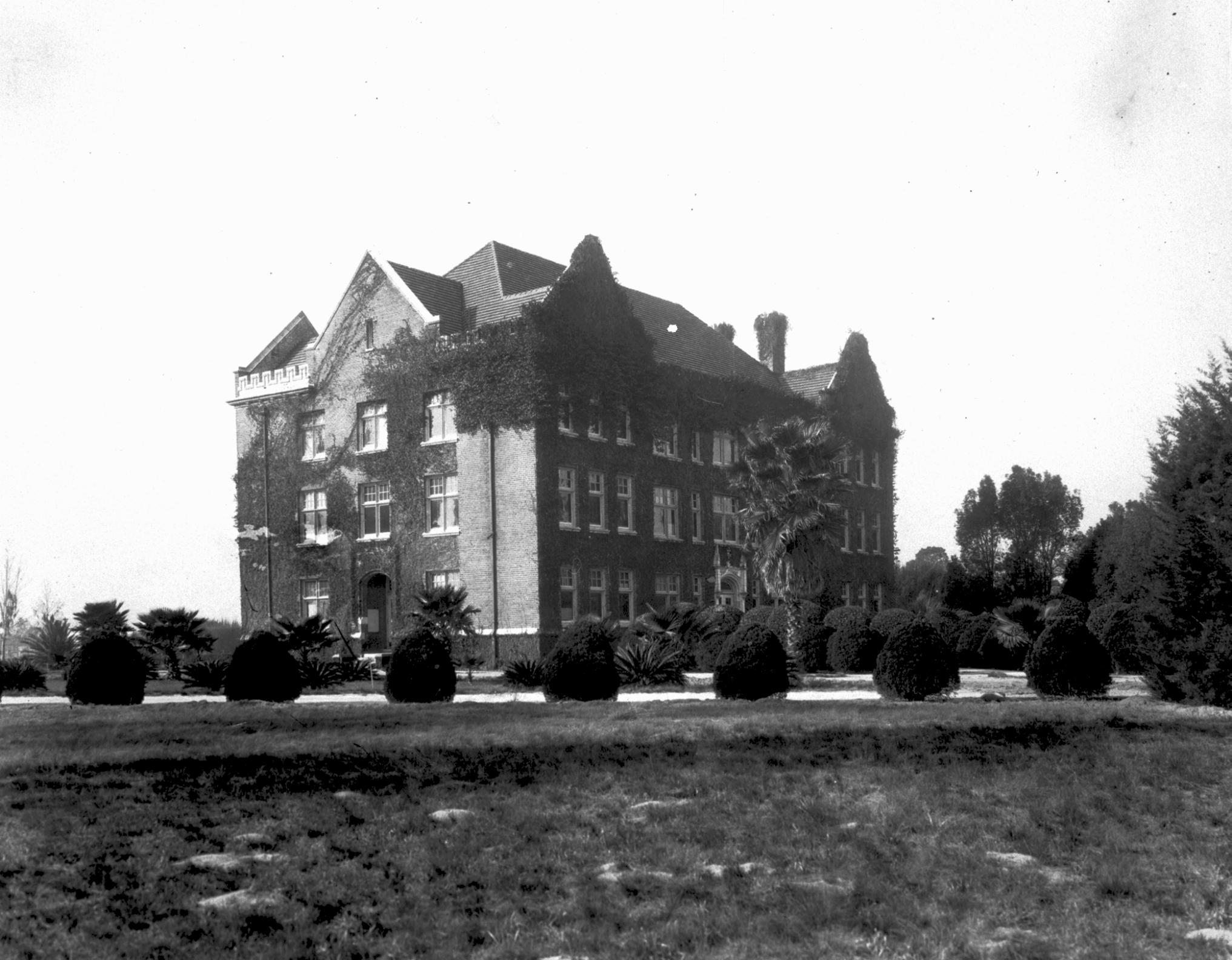
Newell Hall

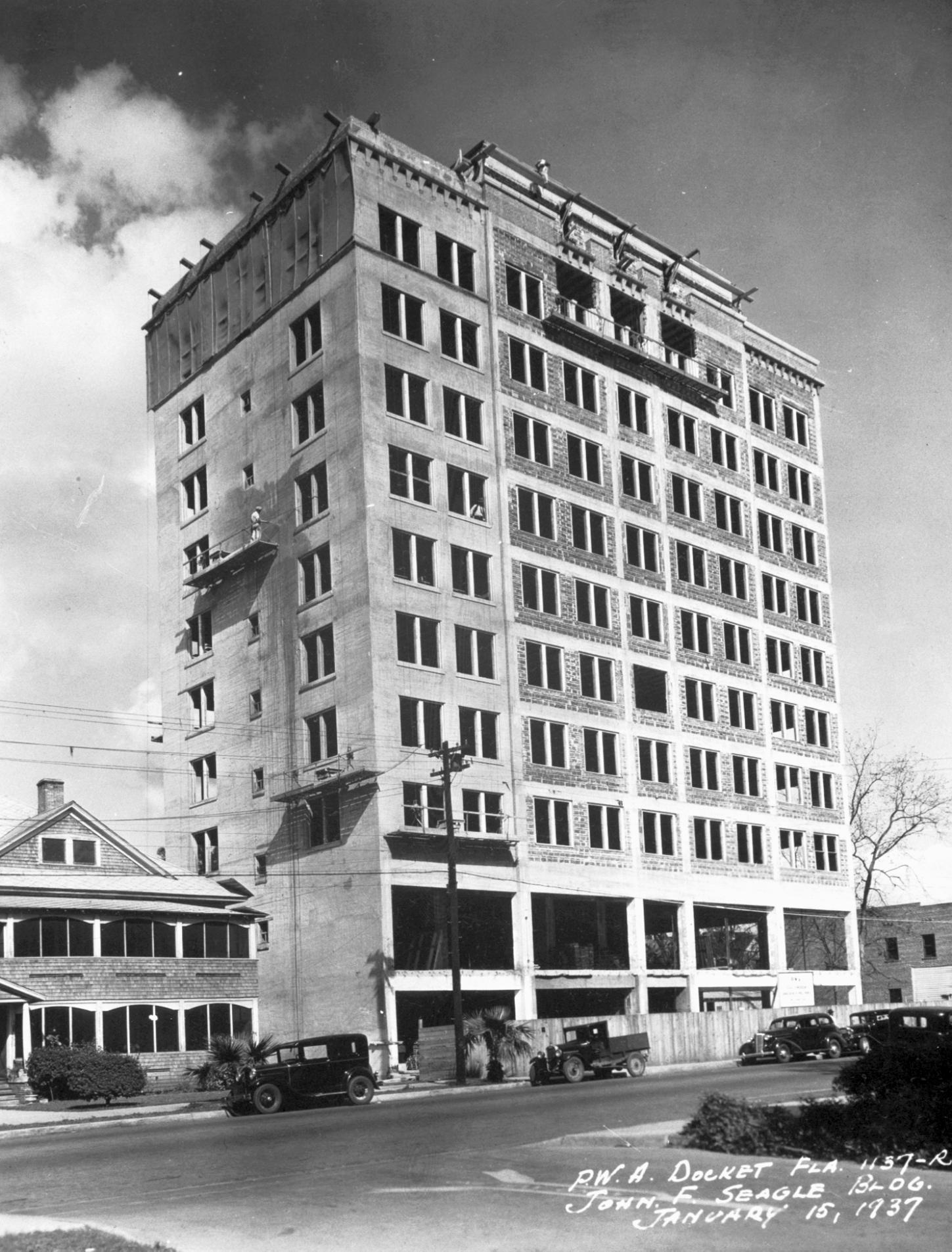
Seagle Building

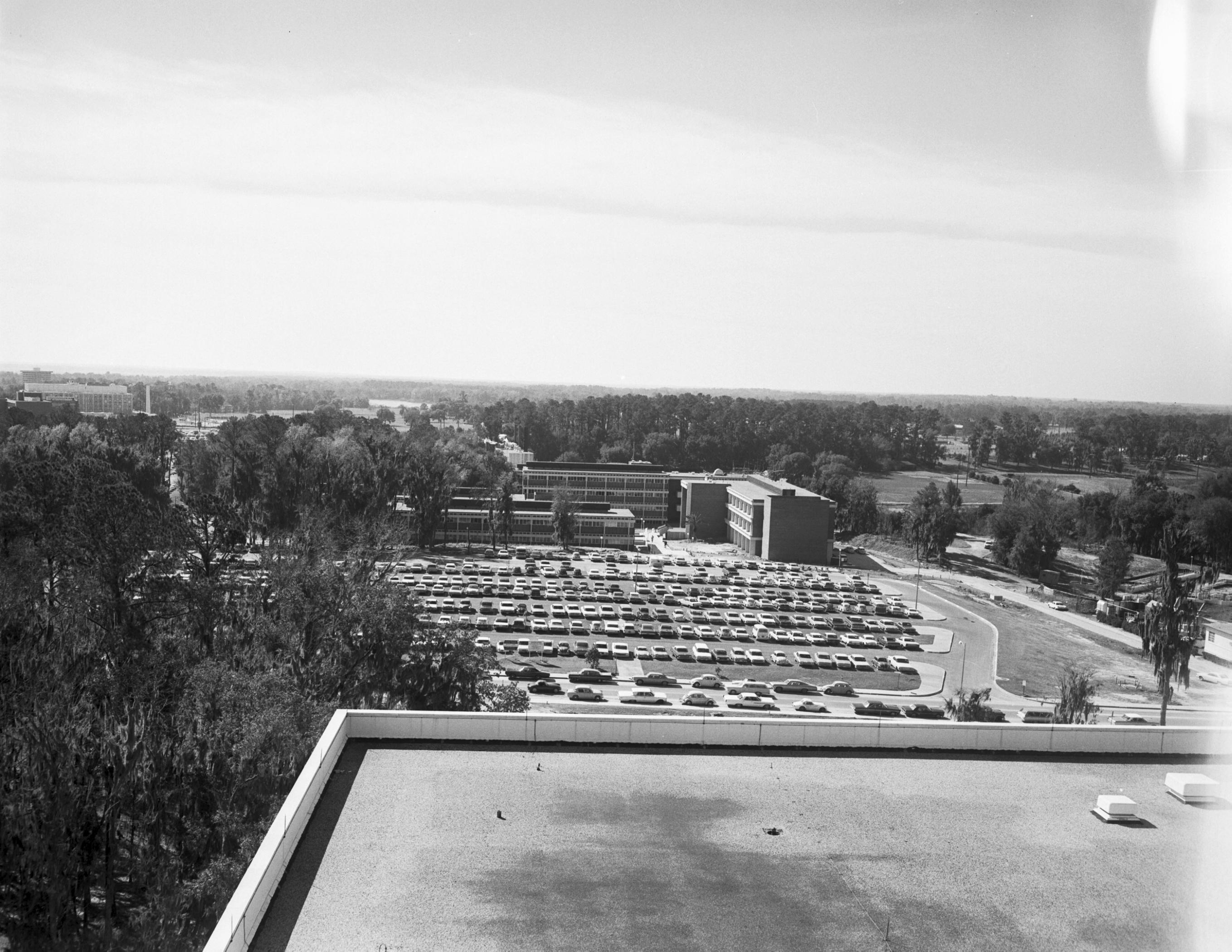
A view of the College of Engineering

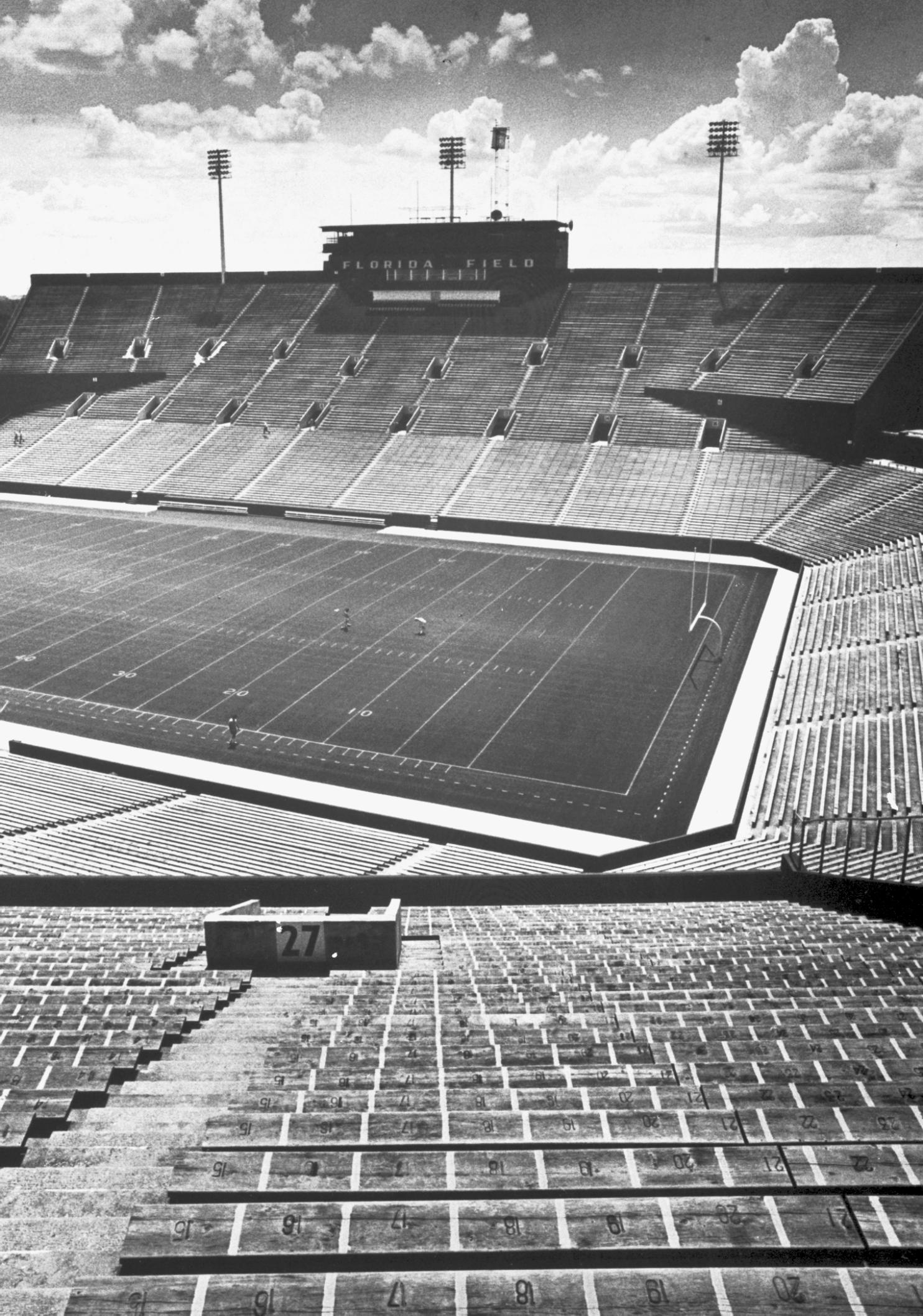
Steve Spurrier-Florida Field at Ben Hill Griffin Stadium

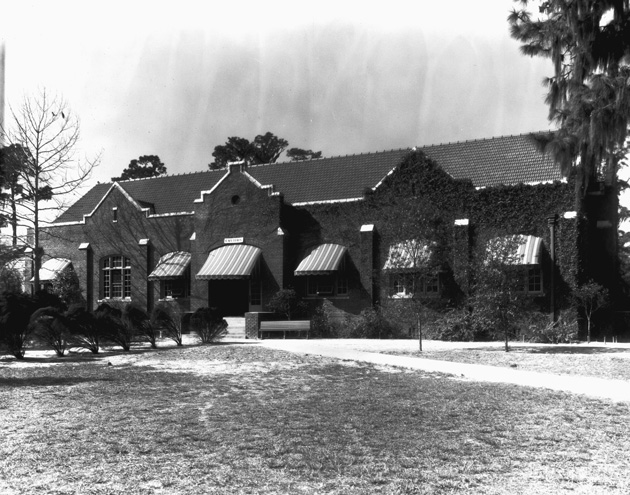
Johnson Hall

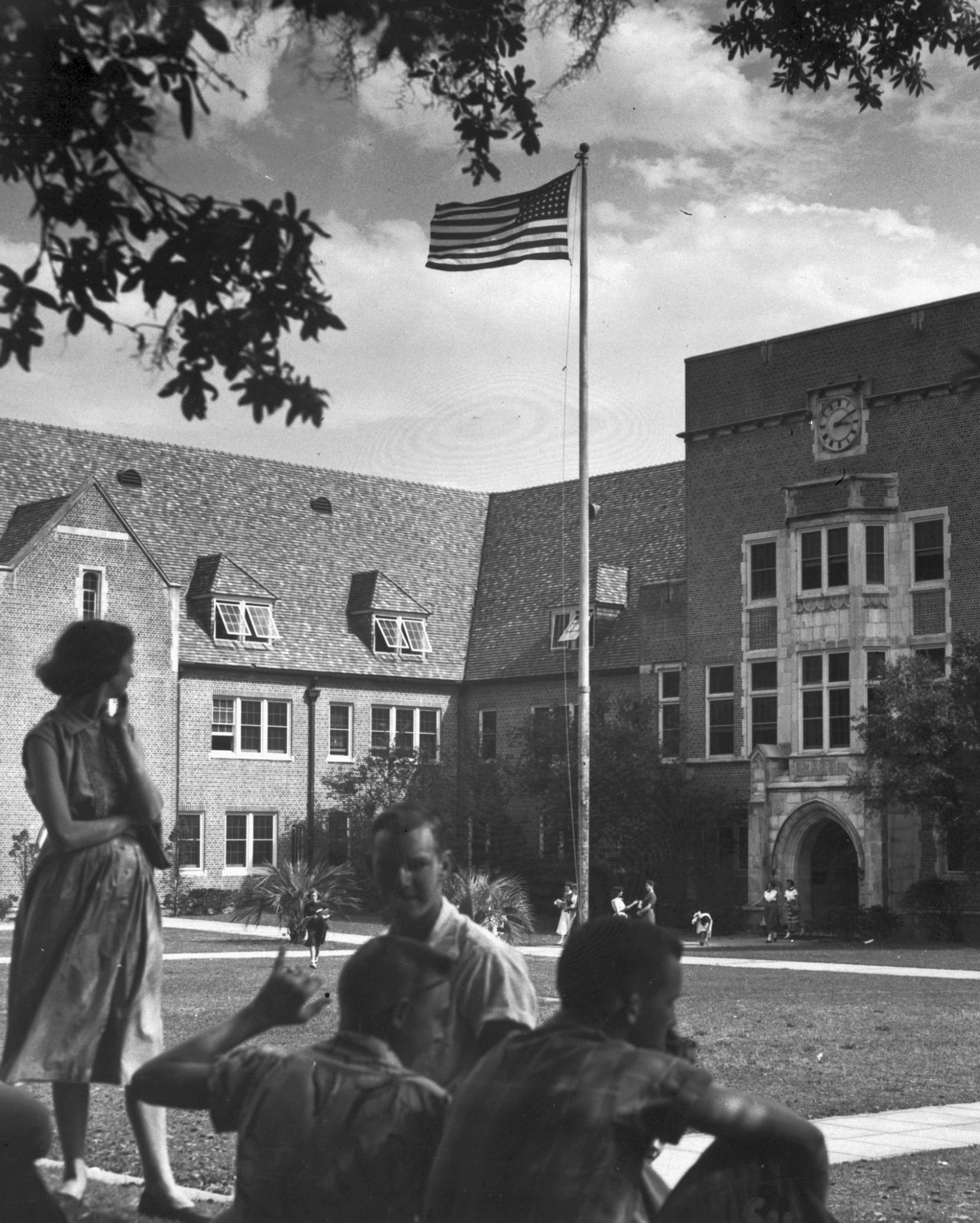
Norman Hall Courtyard

Image	Building	Architect	Completed	Last Major Renovation	Current usage	Gross area.
	Buckman Hall	William Augustus Edwards	1905	1984	Student housing	29,580 sq ft (2,748 m^{2})
	Thomas Hall	William Augustus Edwards	1905	1984	Student housing	35,920 sq ft (3,337 m^{2})
	Newell Hall	William Augustus Edwards	1909	2017		35,038 sq ft (3,255.1 m^{2})
	Flint Hall	William Augustus Edwards	1910	2000	Liberal Arts and Sciences	60,145 sq ft (5,587.7 m^{2})
	Benton Hall	William Augustus Edwards	1911	N/A	Demolished in 1966	N/A
	Griffin-Floyd Hall	William Augustus Edwards	1912	1992	Liberal Arts and Sciences	24,013 sq ft (2,230.9 m^{2})
	Johnson Hall	William Augustus Edwards	1912	N/A	Burned down in 1987	N/A
	Anderson Hall	William Augustus Edwards	1913	2000	Liberal Arts and Sciences	46,949 sq ft (4,361.7 m^{2})
	Peabody Hall	William Augustus Edwards	1913	1991	Student services	35,241 sq ft (3,274.0 m^{2})
	Bryan Hall	William Augustus Edwards	1914	1940	Business	52,047 sq ft (4,835.3 m^{2})
	Ustler Hall, formerly Women's Gymnasium	William Augustus Edwards	1919	1950	Liberal Arts and Sciences	15,952 sq ft (1,482.0 m^{2})
	Institute of Black Culture		1921, 2019 (Note: In 2019, the original buildings for the Institute of Black Culture and Institute of Hispanic-Latino Cultures were rebuilt.)	2019	Black/African-American culture	2,970 sq ft (276 m^{2})
	Institute of Hispanic/Latino Culture		1921, 2019	2019	Hispanic/Latino culture	3,062 sq ft (284.5 m^{2})
	University Auditorium	William Augustus Edwards	1922	1922	Auditorium	49,130 sq ft (4,564 m^{2})
	Plaza of the Americas	Frederick Law Olmsted Jr.	1925	1925	Recreation area	145,000 sq ft (13,500 m^{2})
	Seagle Building	Rudolph Weaver	1926	N/A	Sold to private investors in 1983	1,882 sq ft (174.8 m^{2})
	Walker Hall	Rudolph Weaver	1926	1926	Liberal Arts and Sciences	26,222 sq ft (2,436.1 m^{2})
	Leigh Hall	Rudolph Weaver	1927	1950	Liberal Arts and Sciences	93,931 sq ft (8,726.5 m^{2})
	Rolfs Hall	William Augustus Edwards & Rudolph Weaver	1927	1939	Liberal Arts and Sciences	42,014 sq ft (3,903.2 m^{2})
	Smathers Library	William Augustus Edwards; Guy Fulton	1927	1950	Library	109,851 sq ft (10,205.5 m^{2})
	Sledd Hall	Rudolph Weaver	1929	1984	Student housing	43,310 sq ft (4,024 m^{2})
	Steve Spurrier-Florida Field at Ben Hill Griffin Stadium		1930	2017	Football stadium	419,969 sq ft (39,016.4 m^{2})
	Florida Pool		1930	1930	Recreational pool	9,000 sq ft (840 m^{2})
	University Police Building	Rudolph Weaver	1930	1989	Campus police	4,780 sq ft (444 m^{2})
	Infirmary Hall	Rudolph Weaver	1931	1975	Student health care	49,254 sq ft (4,575.8 m^{2})
	Cooperative Living Organization		1932	1973	Student housing	17,390 sq ft (1,616 m^{2})
	Dauer Hall	Rudolph Weaver	1932	1932	Liberal Arts and Sciences	63,012 sq ft (5,854.0 m^{2})
	Norman Gym		1932	1984	Fine Arts	12,714 sq ft (1,181.2 m^{2})
	Norman Hall	Rudolph Weaver	1932	2020	Education	216,295 sq ft (20,094.5 m^{2})
	Reed Laboratory		1936	1936	Liberal Arts and Sciences	16,646 sq ft (1,546.5 m^{2})
	Aquatic Food Production Pilot Plant		1937	1986	Institute of Food and Agricultural Sciences	17,013 sq ft (1,580.6 m^{2})
	Fletcher Hall	Rudolph Weaver	1939	1984	Student housing	50,500 sq ft (4,690 m^{2})
	Murphree Hall	Rudolph Weaver	1939	2005	Student housing	97,450 sq ft (9,053 m^{2})
	University Press of Florida		1945	N/A	Publishing	16,485 sq ft (1,531.5 m^{2})
	Multi Purpose Lab		1946	1946	Institute of Food and Agricultural Sciences	1,830 sq ft (170 m^{2})
	Phelps Lab		1946	1946	Engineering	8,880 sq ft (825 m^{2})
	Mechanical Engineering Building C		1948	1967	Engineering	26,175 sq ft (2,431.7 m^{2})
	Rhines Hall		1948	1967	Materials Science and Engineering	76,443 sq ft (7,101.8 m^{2})
	Environmental Health and Safety Administrative Offices		1949	2004	Occupational safety and health	7,852 sq ft (729.5 m^{2})
	Florida Gymnasium	Rudolph Weaver & Guy Fulton	1949	1996	Health and Human Performance	163,492 sq ft (15,188.9 m^{2})
	Wilmot Gardens Administration Building		1949	1988	Garden	1,913 sq ft (177.7 m^{2})
	Health Center Annex #1		1950	2014	Medicine	2,330 sq ft (216 m^{2})
	The Hub	Russell Pancoast & Assoc. Guy Fulton	1950	1984	Food court and international center	72,448 sq ft (6,730.6 m^{2})
	Mallory Hall	Guy Fulton	1950	2007	Student housing	43,350 sq ft (4,027 m^{2})
	North Hall	Guy Fulton	1950	2008	Student housing	36,600 sq ft (3,400 m^{2})
	Reid Hall	Guy Fulton	1950	2008	Student housing	42,400 sq ft (3,940 m^{2})
	Riker Hall	Guy Fulton	1950	2008	Student housing	43,440 sq ft (4,036 m^{2})
	Tigert Hall	Jefferson Hamilton	1950	1950	Academic administration	83,211 sq ft (7,730.6 m^{2})
	Tolbert Hall	Guy Fulton	1950	1969	Student housing	54,300 sq ft (5,040 m^{2})
	Yulee Hall	Guy Fulton	1950	2008	Student housing	43,350 sq ft (4,027 m^{2})
	Weaver Hall	Guy Fulton	1950	2002	Student housing	46,840 sq ft (4,352 m^{2})
	University Police Annex #1		1950	1982	Campus police	4,932 sq ft (458.2 m^{2})
	Weil Hall	Guy Fulton	1950	1954	Engineering	153,576 sq ft (14,267.7 m^{2})
	Van Fleet Hall	Guy Fulton	1952	1952	Reserve Officers' Training Corps	21,513 sq ft (1,998.6 m^{2})
	Carleton Auditorium	Guy Fulton	1953	1975	Auditorium	14,100 sq ft (1,310 m^{2})
	President's House		1953	1953	President's residence	9,527 sq ft (885.1 m^{2})
	Broward Hall	Guy Fulton	1954	1954	Student housing	159,100 sq ft (14,780 m^{2})
	Matherly Hall	Rudolph Weaver & Guy Fulton	1954	1954	Business	60,156 sq ft (5,588.7 m^{2})
	Century Tower	William Augustus Edwards; Guy Fulton	1955	1955	Carillon	10,594 sq ft (984.2 m^{2})
	Frazier Rogers Hall		1955	1983	Agricultural and Life Sciences	60,032 sq ft (5,577.2 m^{2})
	McCarty Hall A		1956	1956	Agricultural and Life Sciences	69,960 sq ft (6,499 m^{2})
	McCarty Hall B		1956	1956	Agricultural and Life Sciences	44,800 sq ft (4,160 m^{2})
	McCarty Hall C		1956	1956	Agricultural and Life Sciences	26,446 sq ft (2,456.9 m^{2})
	McCarty Hall D		1956	1969	Agricultural and Life Sciences	63,730 sq ft (5,921 m^{2})
	Observatory		1956	1974	Observatory	520 sq ft (48 m^{2})
	Stetson Medical Sciences Building		1956	1969	Medicine	416,406 sq ft (38,685.4 m^{2})
	Teaching Hospital	Guy Fulton	1956	1974	Medicine hospital	446,534 sq ft (41,484.4 m^{2})
	Corry Memorial Village		1958	1976	Student housing	155,430 sq ft (14,440 m^{2})
	Hume Hall	Ponikvar and Associates of Gainesville	1958, 2002 (Note: The former Hume Hall was razed in Fall 2000 following a proposal in 1998. The current Hume Hall opened in Fall 2002 on the site of the original building.)	2002	Student housing	165,240 sq ft (15,351 m^{2})
	P.K. Yonge Developmental Research School		1958	2021	Magnet school	153,054 sq ft (14,219.2 m^{2})
	Rawlings Hall	Guy Fulton	1958	1993	Student housing	82,930 sq ft (7,704 m^{2})
	Williamson Hall		1958	1958	Liberal Arts and Sciences	75,533 sq ft (7,017.2 m^{2})
	East Hall	Guy Fulton	1961	2008	Student housing	44,230 sq ft (4,109 m^{2})
	Graham Hall	Guy Fulton	1961	1961	Demolished in 2025	58,000 sq ft (5,400 m^{2})
	Jennings Hall	Guy Fulton	1961	1961	Student housing	122,018 sq ft (11,335.8 m^{2})
	Simpson Hall	Guy Fulton	1961	1969	Demolished in 2025	38,930 sq ft (3,617 m^{2})
	Trusler Hall	Guy Fulton	1961	1961	Demolished in 2025	40,540 sq ft (3,766 m^{2})
	Mark Bostick Golf Clubhouse		1963	1988	Golf course	10,636 sq ft (988.1 m^{2})
	Fine Arts Building A		1964	1964	Fine Arts	23,400 sq ft (2,170 m^{2})
	Fine Arts Building B		1964	1964	Fine Arts	12,940 sq ft (1,202 m^{2})
	Fine Arts Building C		1964	1981	Fine Arts	75,303 sq ft (6,995.9 m^{2})
	Nuclear Sciences Building		1964	1964	Liberal Arts and Sciences	87,780 sq ft (8,155 m^{2})
	Diamond Village		1965	1965	Student housing	163,300 sq ft (15,170 m^{2})
	Little Hall		1965	1965	Liberal Arts and Sciences	98,418 sq ft (9,143.3 m^{2})
	Beaty Towers	Forrest Kelly	1967	2010	Student housing	168,200 sq ft (15,630 m^{2})
	Benton Hall		1967	1967	Engineering	28,600 sq ft (2,660 m^{2})
	Black Hall		1967	1967	Engineering	38,851 sq ft (3,609.4 m^{2})
	Constans Theatre		1967	2004	Performing arts center	82,960 sq ft (7,707 m^{2})
	Housing Office		1967	1967	Housing	18,570 sq ft (1,725 m^{2})
	Human Development Center		1967	1967	Medicine	63,675 sq ft (5,915.6 m^{2})
	Human Resources Building		1967	N/A	Academic administration	29,883 sq ft (2,776.2 m^{2})
	Larsen Hall		1967	1967	Engineering	40,970 sq ft (3,806 m^{2})
	Library West		1967	2006	Library	177,129 sq ft (16,455.8 m^{2})
	Mechanical Engineering Building A		1967	1967	Engineering	43,696 sq ft (4,059.5 m^{2})
	Mechanical Engineering Building B		1967	1967	Engineering	44,407 sq ft (4,125.5 m^{2})
	Reitz Student Union		1967	2016	Students' union	348,210 sq ft (32,350 m^{2})
	Sisler Hall		1967	1993	Engineering	69,426 sq ft (6,449.9 m^{2})
	Bartram Hall		1968	1968	Liberal Arts and Sciences	59,710 sq ft (5,547 m^{2})
	Bryant Space Science Center		1968	1984	Liberal Arts and Sciences	59,129 sq ft (5,493.3 m^{2})
	Holland Law Center	Russell Pancoast	1968	1968	Law	204,963 sq ft (19,041.7 m^{2})
	Food Science and Human Nutrition Building		1969	1969	Health and Human Performance	45,045 sq ft (4,184.8 m^{2})
	Material Engineering Building		1969	1976	Engineering	35,984 sq ft (3,343.0 m^{2})
	Dickinson Hall		1970	1970	Museum	115,095 sq ft (10,692.7 m^{2})
	Grinter Hall		1971	1971	Liberal Arts and Sciences	56,620 sq ft (5,260 m^{2})
	Maguire Village		1971	1971	Demolished in 2025	211,930 sq ft (19,689 m^{2})
	Music Building		1971	1971	Fine Arts	73,057 sq ft (6,787.2 m^{2})
	Psychology Building		1972	1986	Liberal Arts and Sciences	74,587 sq ft (6,929.4 m^{2})
	University Village South		1972	1976	Student housing	118,230 sq ft (10,984 m^{2})
	Tanglewood Village		1973	1973	Student housing	192,420 sq ft (17,876 m^{2})
	Carr Hall		1974	1974	Liberal Arts and Sciences	48,120 sq ft (4,470 m^{2})
	Communicore Building		1975	1975	Medicine	333,659 sq ft (30,997.9 m^{2})
	Dental Science Building		1975	1975	Dentistry	488,600 sq ft (45,390 m^{2})
	General Services Building		1975	1975	Medicine hospital	42,089 sq ft (3,910.2 m^{2})
	Development and Alumni Affairs Building		1976	1976	Financial services	20,424 sq ft (1,897.5 m^{2})
	Newins-Ziegler Hall		1976	1976	Institute of Food and Agricultural Sciences	59,242 sq ft (5,503.8 m^{2})
	Basic Science Building		1977	1977	Veterinary Medicine	80,789 sq ft (7,505.5 m^{2})
	Turlington Hall		1977	1977	Liberal Arts and Sciences	184,137 sq ft (17,106.9 m^{2})
	Veterinary Medicine Food Animal Clinic		1977	1977	Veterinary Medicine hospital	14,910 sq ft (1,385 m^{2})
	Veterinary Medicine Teaching Hospital		1977	1990	Veterinary Medicine hospital	126,532 sq ft (11,755.2 m^{2})
	Gator Band Shell		1978	1978	Demolished in 2010	2,370 sq ft (220 m^{2})
	Architecture Building		1979	1979	Design, Construction and Planning	114,156 sq ft (10,605.4 m^{2})
	Fifield Hall		1979	1979	Institute of Food and Agricultural Sciences	109,472 sq ft (10,170.3 m^{2})
	O'Connell Center		1980	2016	Arena	309,843 sq ft (28,785.4 m^{2})
	Weimer Hall		1980	1980	Journalism and Communications	151,594 sq ft (14,083.5 m^{2})
	Stuzin Hall		1981	1981	Business	54,916 sq ft (5,101.9 m^{2})
	V. A. Hospital		1981	N/A	Veterans Affairs hospital	35,000 sq ft (3,300 m^{2})
	Animal Sciences Building		1982	1985	Agricultural and Life Sciences	96,694 sq ft (8,983.2 m^{2})
	Patient Services Building		1983	1988	Medicine hospital	588,570 sq ft (54,680 m^{2})
	Bruton-Geer Hall		1984	1984	Law	45,493 sq ft (4,226.4 m^{2})
	Computer Science Building		1986	1986	Engineering	119,079 sq ft (11,062.8 m^{2})
	James G. Pressly Stadium		1986	1994	Soccer and track and field stadium	11,605 sq ft (1,078.1 m^{2})
	Marston Science Library		1986	1986	Library	115,730 sq ft (10,752 m^{2})
	Varsity Tennis Building		1986	1986	Tennis athletics facility	1,543 sq ft (143.3 m^{2})
	Winn-Dixie Hope Lodge		1986	1992	Medicine	51,000 sq ft (4,700 m^{2})
	Alfred A. McKethan Stadium		1987	1987	Baseball stadium; replaced by Condron Ballpark in 2021	77,274 sq ft (7,179.0 m^{2})
	Linder Tennis Stadium		1987	1987	Tennis stadium	8,581 sq ft (797.2 m^{2})
	Academic Research Building		1989	1989	Medicine	278,245 sq ft (25,849.8 m^{2})
	Chemistry Laboratory		1990	1990	Liberal Arts and Sciences	85,880 sq ft (7,979 m^{2})
	Doyle Conner Building		1990	N/A	Liberal Arts and Sciences	N/A
	Entomology-Nematology Building		1990	1990	Liberal Arts and Sciences	92,316 sq ft (8,576.4 m^{2})
	Harn Museum of Art		1990	1995	Museum	87,681 sq ft (8,145.8 m^{2})
	Criser Hall		1991	1991	Academic administration	64,248 sq ft (5,968.8 m^{2})
	Davis Cancer Pavilion		1991	1998	Medicine	128,594 sq ft (11,946.8 m^{2})
	Elmore Hall		1991	1991	Academic administration	18,230 sq ft (1,694 m^{2})
	Keys Residential Complex	KBJ Architects	1991	1991	Student housing	188,211 sq ft (17,485.4 m^{2})
	Little Hall Express		1991	1991	Dining	770 sq ft (72 m^{2})
	Recreation and Fitness Center		1991	1991	Fitness center	59,161 sq ft (5,496.2 m^{2})
	Recreational Center Dining		1991	1991	Dining	14,800 sq ft (1,370 m^{2})
	Phillips Center		1992	1992	Performing arts center	69,874 sq ft (6,491.5 m^{2})
	Courtelis Equine Teaching Hospital		1993	1993	Veterinary Medicine hospital	67,245 sq ft (6,247.3 m^{2})
	Microbiology/Cell Science Building		1994	1994	Liberal Arts and Sciences	69,917 sq ft (6,495.5 m^{2})
	Shepard Broad Building		1994	1994	Institutional Animal Care and Use Committee	13,436 sq ft (1,248.2 m^{2})
	Southwest Recreation Center		1994	2010	Fitness center	138,912 sq ft (12,905.3 m^{2})
	Farrior Hall		1995	1995	Academic advising	37,220 sq ft (3,458 m^{2})
	Lemerand Center		1995	1995	Athletics facility	46,000 sq ft (4,300 m^{2})
	Sid Martin Biotechnology Incubator		1995	1995	Business incubator	39,981 sq ft (3,714.4 m^{2})
	Springs Residential Complex	KBJ Architects	1995	1995	Student housing	120,160 sq ft (11,163 m^{2})
	Gator Corner Dining Facility		1996	1996	Dining	22,135 sq ft (2,056.4 m^{2})
	Powell Hall		1996	1996	Museum	61,715 sq ft (5,733.5 m^{2})
	Pressly Softball Stadium		1996	2019	Softball stadium	7,371 sq ft (684.8 m^{2})
	Ring Tennis Pavilion		1996	1996	Tennis athletics facility	19,200 sq ft (1,780 m^{2})
	Veterinary Medicine Academic Wing		1996	1996	Veterinary Medicine	184,851 sq ft (17,173.2 m^{2})
	Aquatic Products Lab		1997	1997	Institute of Food and Agricultural Sciences	10,380 sq ft (964 m^{2})
	New Engineering Building		1997	1997	Engineering	140,179 sq ft (13,023.1 m^{2})
	University Foundation Annex		1997	1997	Financial services	22,780 sq ft (2,116 m^{2})
	Carse Swimming Complex		1998	1998	Swimming facility	6,692 sq ft (621.7 m^{2})
	McKnight Brain Institute		1998	1998	Medicine	208,498 sq ft (19,370.1 m^{2})
	Particle Science Technology Building		1998	1998	Engineering	29,535 sq ft (2,743.9 m^{2})
	Physics Building		1998	1998	Liberal Arts and Sciences	232,714 sq ft (21,619.8 m^{2})
	Ring Varsity Tennis Building		1998	1998	Tennis athletics facility	5,520 sq ft (513 m^{2})
	Shands Medical Plaza		1998	1998	Medicine	111,446 sq ft (10,353.7 m^{2})
	105 Classroom Building		2000	2000	Academic administration	33,906 sq ft (3,150.0 m^{2})
	Baughman Center	John Zona	2000	2000	Convention center	1,474 sq ft (136.9 m^{2})
	Broward Dining Facility		2000	2000	Dining	17,130 sq ft (1,591 m^{2})
	Lakeside Residential Complex	KBJ Architects	2000	2000	Student housing	158,135 sq ft (14,691.2 m^{2})
	UF Hotel and Conference Center		2000	2000	Convention center and hotel	189,600 sq ft (17,610 m^{2})
	Basketball Practice Facility		2001	2001	Basketball practice facility	48,850 sq ft (4,538 m^{2})
	Emerson Alumni Hall		2002	2002	Alumni association	61,862 sq ft (5,747.2 m^{2})
	Gran Telescopio Canarias		2002	2002	Liberal Arts and Sciences	43,056 sq ft (4,000.0 m^{2})
	Rinker Hall		2002	2002	Design, Construction and Planning	48,906 sq ft (4,543.5 m^{2})
	Bookstore and Welcome Center		2003	2003	Bookstore and visitor center	222,592 sq ft (20,679.5 m^{2})
	Gerson Hall		2003	2003	Business	44,630 sq ft (4,146 m^{2})
	Health Profession, Nursing, Pharmacy Building		2003	2003	Health, Nursing, and Pharmacy	197,384 sq ft (18,337.6 m^{2})
	Lipoff Hall		2004	2004	Hillel International	23,000 sq ft (2,100 m^{2})
	McGuire Center		2004	2004	Museum	46,354 sq ft (4,306.4 m^{2})
	Orthopaedics and Sports Medicine Institute		2004	2004	Health and Human Performance	132,664 sq ft (12,324.9 m^{2})
	Cancer and Genetics Research Complex		2006	2006	Medicine	290,820 sq ft (27,018 m^{2})
	Deriso Hall		2006	2006	Veterinary Medicine	9,998 sq ft (928.8 m^{2})
	Randell Research Center		2006	2006	Liberal Arts and Sciences	2,500 sq ft (230 m^{2})
	Nanoscale Research Facility		2008	2008	Liberal Arts and Sciences	55,692 sq ft (5,174.0 m^{2})
	Pugh Hall		2008	2008	Samuel Proctor Oral History Program, Bob Graham Center for Public Service, and Department of Languages, Literatures, and Cultures	45,690 sq ft (4,245 m^{2})
	Steinbrenner Band Hall		2008	2008	Marching band facility	18,209 sq ft (1,691.7 m^{2})
	Cancer Center		2009	2009	Medicine hospital	500,000 sq ft (46,000 m^{2})
	Biomedical Sciences Building		2009	2009	Medicine	146,611 sq ft (13,620.6 m^{2})
	Donald R. Dizney Stadium		2009	2009	Lacrosse stadium	23,425 sq ft (2,176.3 m^{2})
	Emerging Pathogens Institute		2009	2009	Medicine	88,858 sq ft (8,255.2 m^{2})
	Veterinary Education and Clinical Research Center		2009	2009	Veterinary Medicine	104,000 sq ft (9,700 m^{2})
	Counseling and Wellness Center		2010	2010	Student health care	20,000 sq ft (1,900 m^{2})
	East Campus Office Building		2010	2010	Engineering School of Sustainable Infrastructure & Environment	83,526 sq ft (7,759.8 m^{2})
	Hough Hall		2010	2010	Business	72,140 sq ft (6,702 m^{2})
	Law Advocacy Center		2010	2010	Law	20,461 sq ft (1,900.9 m^{2})
	Chemical Engineering Student Center		2011	2011	Chemical Engineering	11,789 sq ft (1,095.2 m^{2})
	UF Innovation Hub		2011	2018	Business incubator	106,000 sq ft (9,800 m^{2})
	Research Building at Lake Nona		2012	2012	Medicine	99,656 sq ft (9,258.3 m^{2})
	Clinical and Translational Research Building		2013	2013	University of Florida Health	120,000 sq ft (11,000 m^{2})
	Heavener Hall	SchenkelShultz Architecture	2014	2014	Business	57,000 sq ft (5,300 m^{2})
	Hitchcock Field & Fork Pantry		2015	2019	Food pantry	
	Indoor Practice Facility		2015	2015	Football practice facility	87,218 sq ft (8,102.8 m^{2})
	Harrell Medical Education Building		2015	2015	University of Florida College of Medicine	109,202 sq ft (10,145.2 m^{2})
	Infinity Hall		2015	2015	Student housing	96,477 sq ft (8,963.0 m^{2})
	Scott Family Chemistry Building (Note: Previously named Joseph Hernandez Hall between 2017 and 2020, and The Chemistry/Chemical Biology Building between 2020 and 2022.)		2017	2017	Liberal Arts and Sciences	111,552 sq ft (10,363.5 m^{2})
	Condron Ballpark	Populous, Walker Architects	2021	2021	Baseball field	97,200 sq ft (9,030 m^{2})
	Herbert Wertheim Laboratory for Engineering Excellence		2021	2021	Engineering	86,000 sq ft (8,000 m^{2})
	University Public Safety Building	Schenkel & Shultz Inc	2023	2023	Campus police	50,000 sq ft (4,600 m^{2})
	Student Health Care Center	Walker Architects Inc	2023	2023	Student health care	50,000 sq ft (4,600 m^{2})
	Malachowsky Hall for Data Science & Information Technology	Bohlin Cywinski Jackson	2023	2023	Engineering	263,000 sq ft (24,400 m^{2})
	Honors Village	Walker Architects Inc	2023	2024	Student housing	420,000 sq ft (39,000 m^{2})

== Buildings under construction ==
Image	Building	Architect	Expected Completion	Usage	Gross area.

== See also ==
- University of Florida
- University of Florida Campus Historic District
- University of Florida student housing
