= University of Florida Cancer and Genetics Research Complex =

Research center at the University of Florida

Cancer and Genetics Research Complex
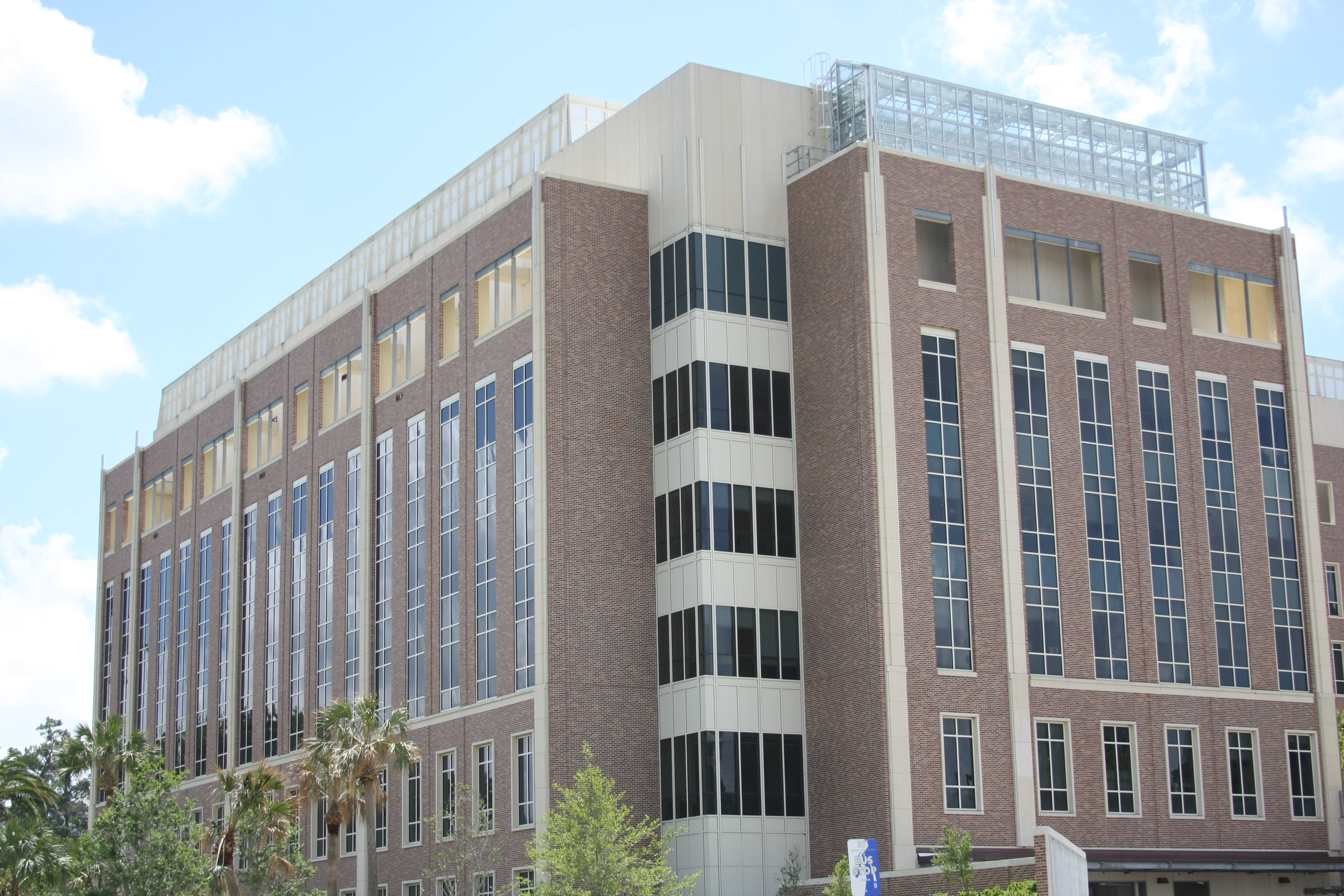
- Established: 2006
- Location: Gainesville, Florida, USA; 29°38′16.3″N 82°21′5.0″W
- Website: Official website

Cancer and Genetics Research Complex is an interdisciplinary research center located at the University of Florida (UF). The goal of this facility is "to harness the diverse academic talents and resources of the genetic research community at UF to improve the health and well-being of our citizenry." The Complex houses the UF Genetics Institute, the UF Health Cancer Center, the UF Interdisciplinary Center for Biotechnology Research, and the C.A. Pound Human Identification Laboratory, a laboratory notable for research and consulting in forensic anthropology.

== History ==
The Complex began construction in 2002, and cost an estimated $85 million. In November 2006, Governor Jeb Bush officially opened the facility. Overall, 77 million pounds of concrete were used, and the facility is 280,000 square feet.

== Images ==
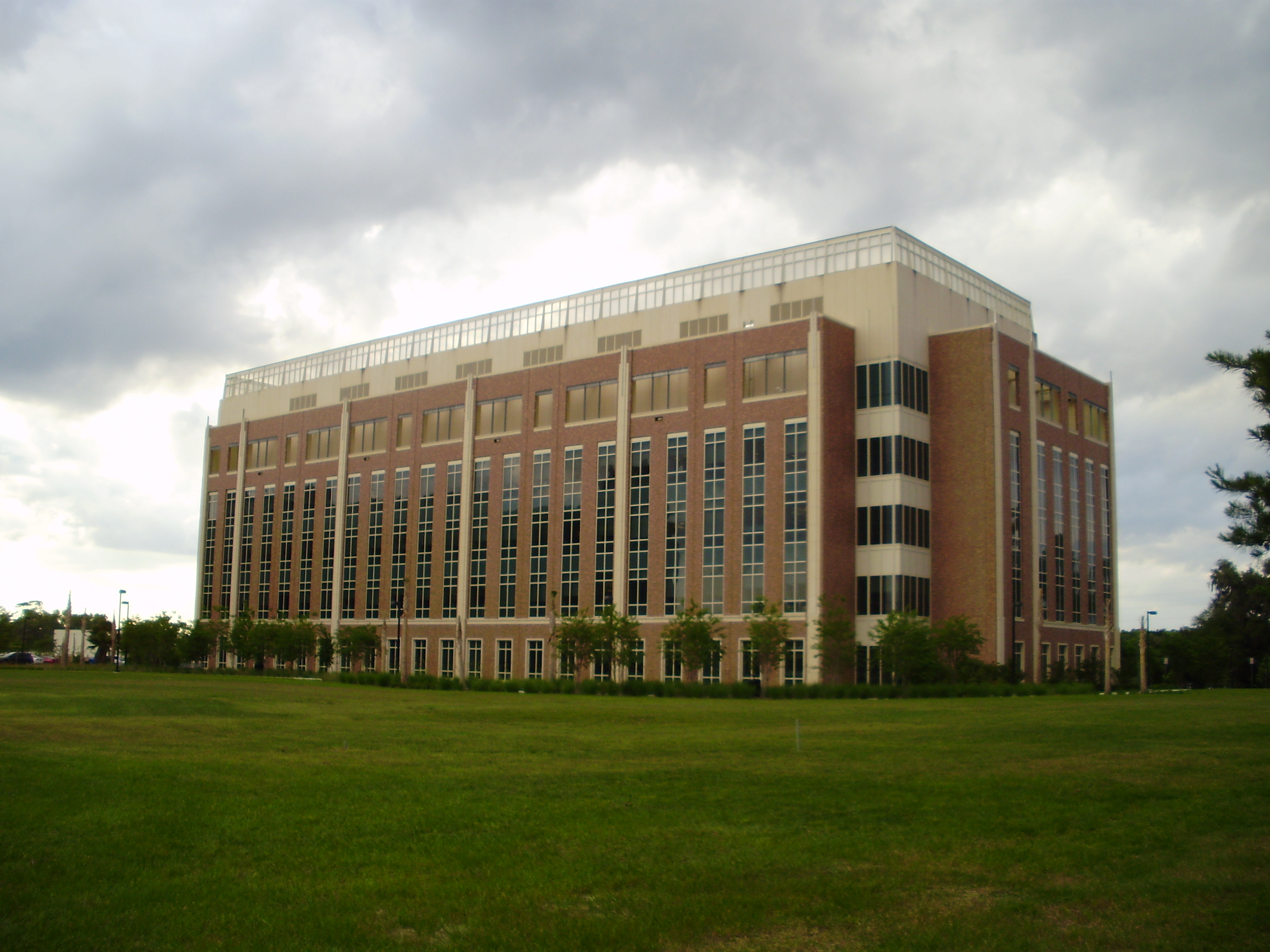
South wing

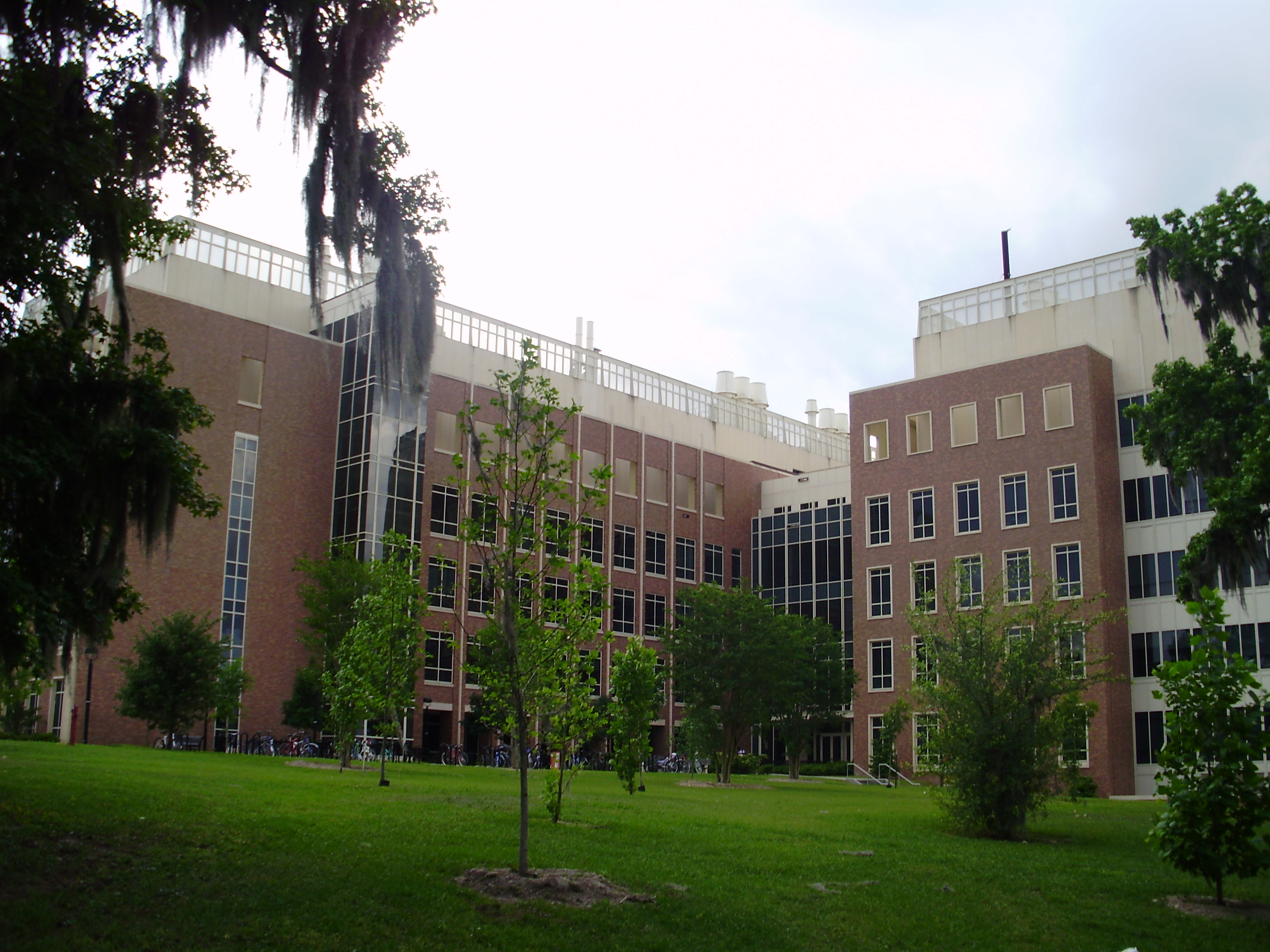
South wing (left) and north wing (right)

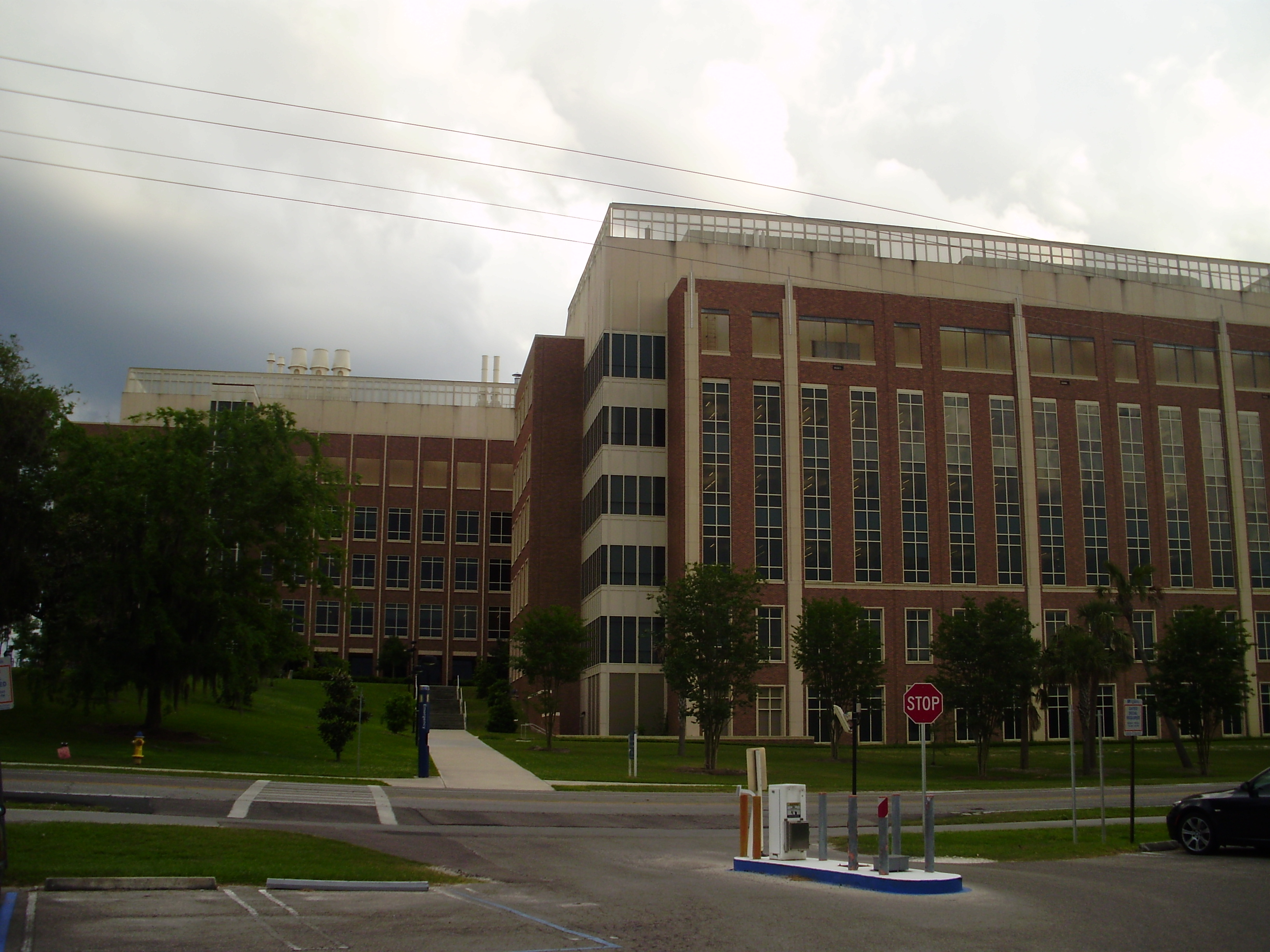
North wing (near) and south wing (far)

== See also ==
- University of Florida
- Buildings at the University of Florida
