= Newell Hall =

- U.S. National Register of Historic Places
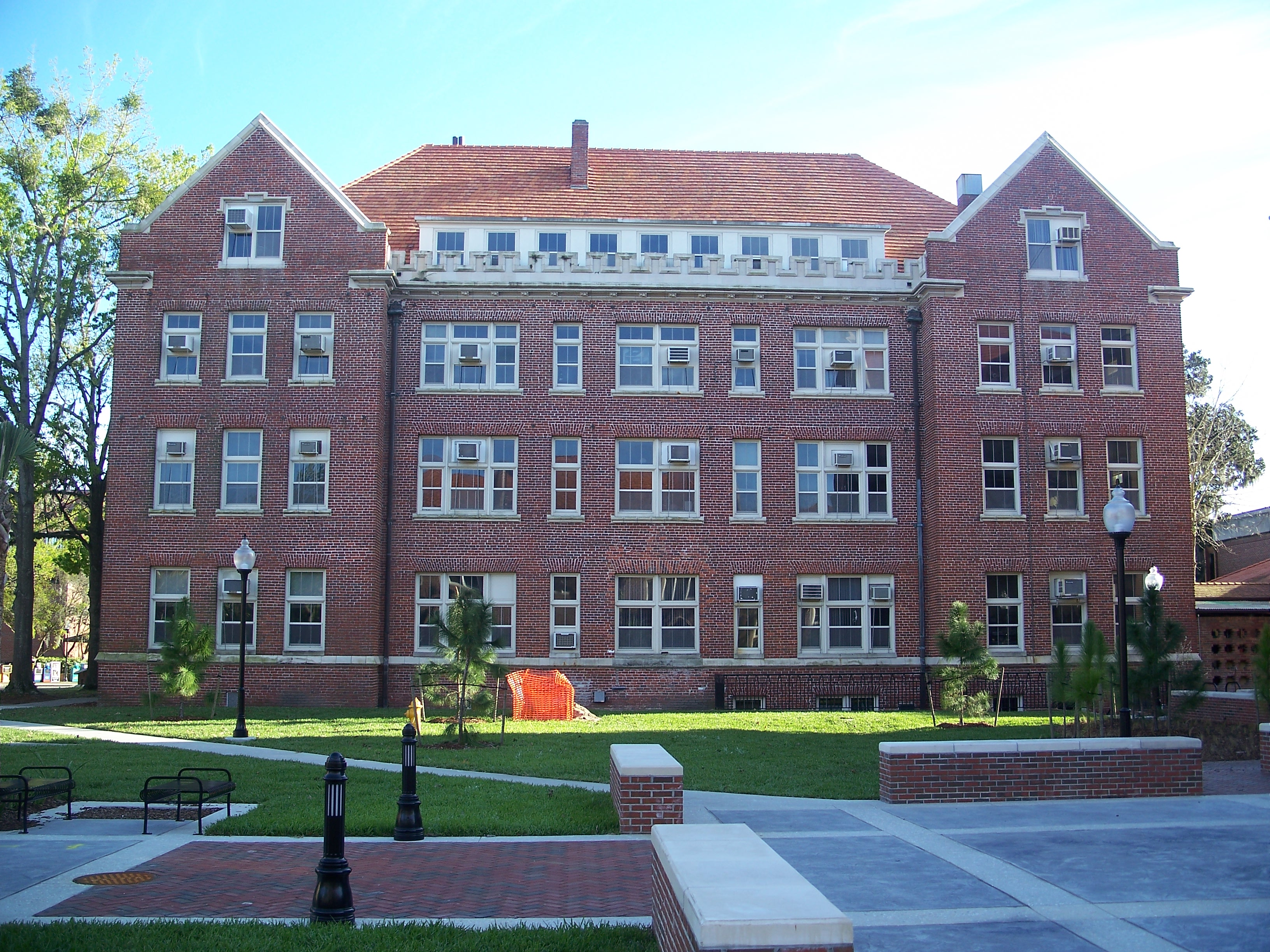

- Location within Florida Location within the United States
- Location: Stadium Rd., Gainesville, Florida
- Coordinates: 29°38′56″N 82°20′43″W
- Built: 1910
- Architect: William Augustus Edwards
- Architectural style: Collegiate Gothic
- NRHP reference No.: 79000657
- Added to NRHP: June 27, 1979

Newell Hall is a historic site in Gainesville, Florida, United States. It is located in the northeastern section of the University of Florida, directly across the street from The Hub building and next to the Bryant Space Center. On June 27, 1979, it was added to the U.S. National Register of Historic Places. Formerly home to the Department of Soil and Water Science, the building is currently used as a study space for university students to collaborate.

== Namesake ==
Newell Hall is named for Wilmon Newell, the Provost of Agriculture at the University of Florida from 1921 until his death in October 1943.

== What's Inside ==
As of November 2025, Newell Hall hosts a deli known as Paper Bag, two floors of study space, and the Center for Undergraduate Research Board of Students. It also hosts 4 printers, 2 of which are part of the UF Student Government free printing program. On the outside, there are a few circular tables with umbrellas and a small ping pong table.

== Renovations & Changes ==
On April 17, 2017, a newly renovated and expanded Newell Hall opened on campus. The $16.6 million project added expansive indoor seating, an Au Bon Pain restaurant, as well as numerous modern study spaces and meeting rooms. Outdoor hammocks were installed and new landscaping was added.

During late Fall of 2022, the Au Bon Pain closed and was replaced with a local restaurant known as Sweet Berries Eatery and Frozen Custard.

Over the summer of 2025, the Sweet Berries Eatery restaurant underwent new renovations and was converted into a local deli known as The Paper Bag. As of recent reports, the sign on the interior wall still reads as Au Bon Pan.

== See also ==
- University of Florida
- Buildings at the University of Florida
- Campus Historic District
