= University of Florida Southwest Recreation Center =

Sports facility at the University of Florida

Southwest Recreation Center
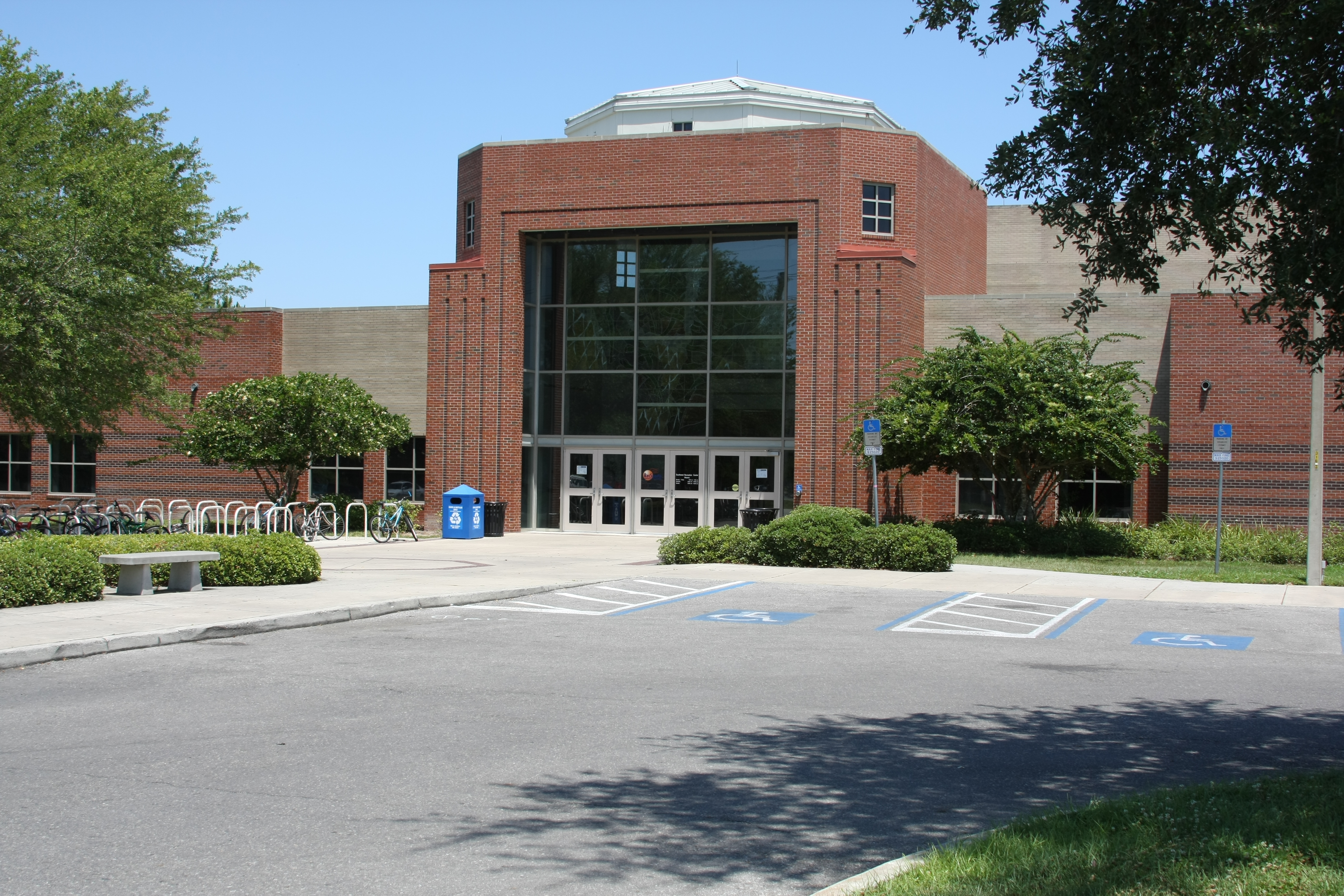
- Established: 1994
- Location: Florida, USA; 29°38′18.3″N 82°22′6.1″W
- Website: Official Website

The Southwest Recreation Center, is one of three athletic facilities at the University of Florida with services available to students, alumni, and faculty members. The facility had a major expansion in 2010 that includes an expanded cardiovascular room and an indoor track.

Facilities include

- A 140,000 square feet (13,000 m^{2}) strength and conditioning room
- Six indoor basketball courts
- Five indoor racquetball courts
- A multipurpose gymnasium for indoor soccer, handball, and basketball
- A 15,000 square feet (1,400 m^{2}) split-level room with cardiovascular equipment
- Two Massage Therapy rooms
- Personal Training studio
- Fitness Assessment Center (FAC)
- Athletic Training room
- Three Activity rooms
- Men’s and Women’s locker rooms with digital locks
- Day lockers
- Social lounge

== See also ==
- University of Florida
- Buildings at the University of Florida
