= Curtis M. Phillips Center for the Performing Arts =

Theater in Gainesville, Florida, U.S.

- Phillips Center
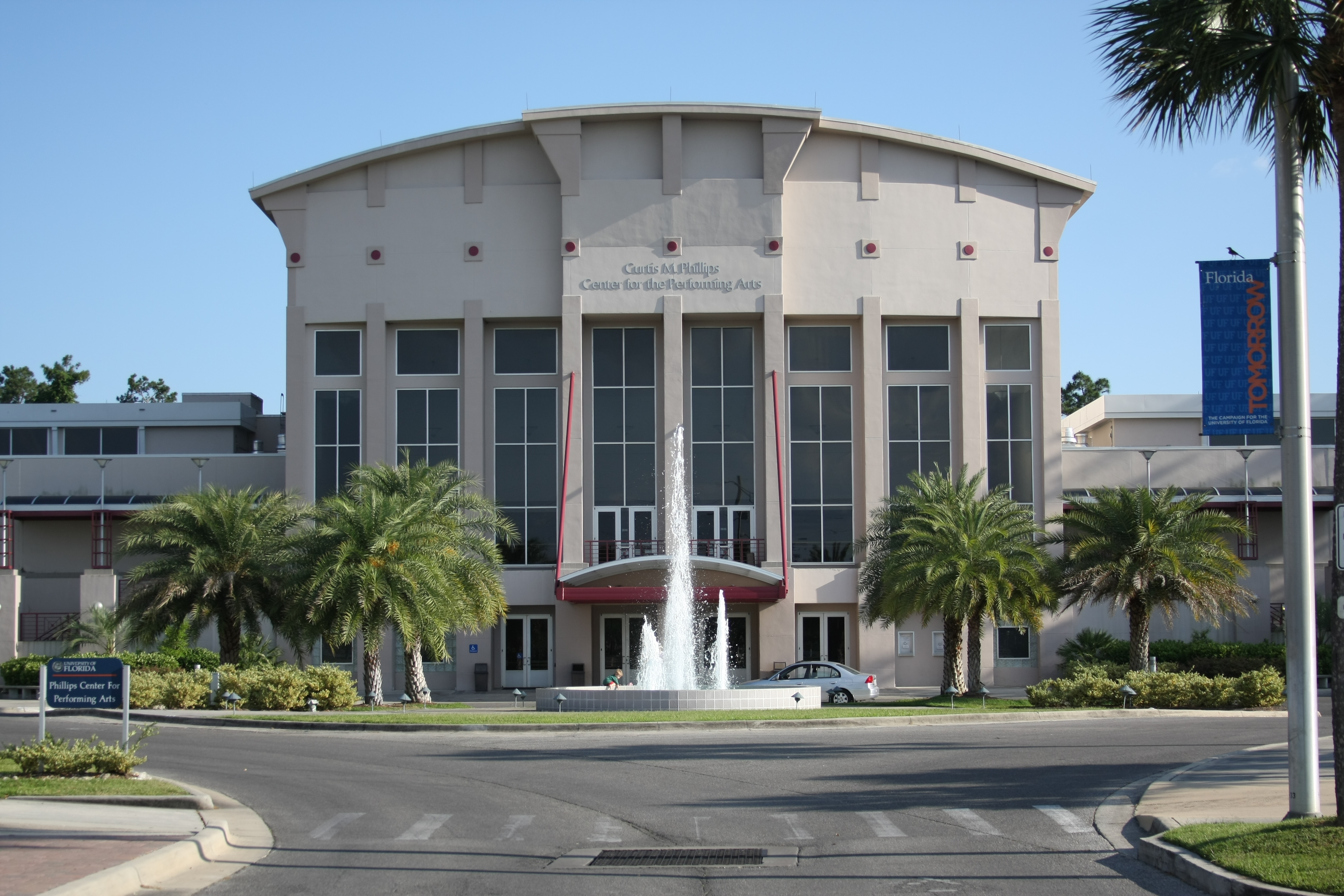

- Location within Florida Location within the United States
- Full name: Curtis M. Phillips, M.D. Center for the Performing Arts
- Address: 3201 Hull Road, Gainesville, Florida, United States
- Coordinates: 29°38′6.95″N 82°22′9.51″W

Construction
- Opened: 1992

The Curtis M. Phillips Center for the Performing Arts is a performing arts theatre in Gainesville, Florida, United States. It is located on the western side of the University of Florida campus. This facility presents some of the most established and emerging national and international artists on the main stage. In all, the Phillips Center consists of a 1,700-seat proscenium hall and a 200-seat Black Box Theatre. In 2000, retired Jacksonville surgeon Curtis M. Phillips provided The Barbara J. and Curtis M. Phillips M.D. Endowment Fund to name the performing arts center.

== Performances ==
Since opening its doors in January 1992 with three sold-out performances of Cats, the Phillips Center has hosted performers as diverse as Tony Bennett, Itzhak Perlman, Riverdance, Dame Kiri Te Kanawa, Ray Charles, Alvin Ailey American Dance Theater, Alison Krauss, Stomp, Yo-Yo Ma, David Sedaris, Bolshoi Ballet, Wynton Marsalis, John Green, Jerusalem Symphony Orchestra and Capitol Steps. In recent years, the Phillips Center has hosted world premieres and been home to productions of Aeros and the People of the Forest as they mounted new, collaborative works.

== See also ==
- University of Florida
- Buildings at the University of Florida
