= University of Florida Investment Corporation =

Subsidiary of the University of Florida

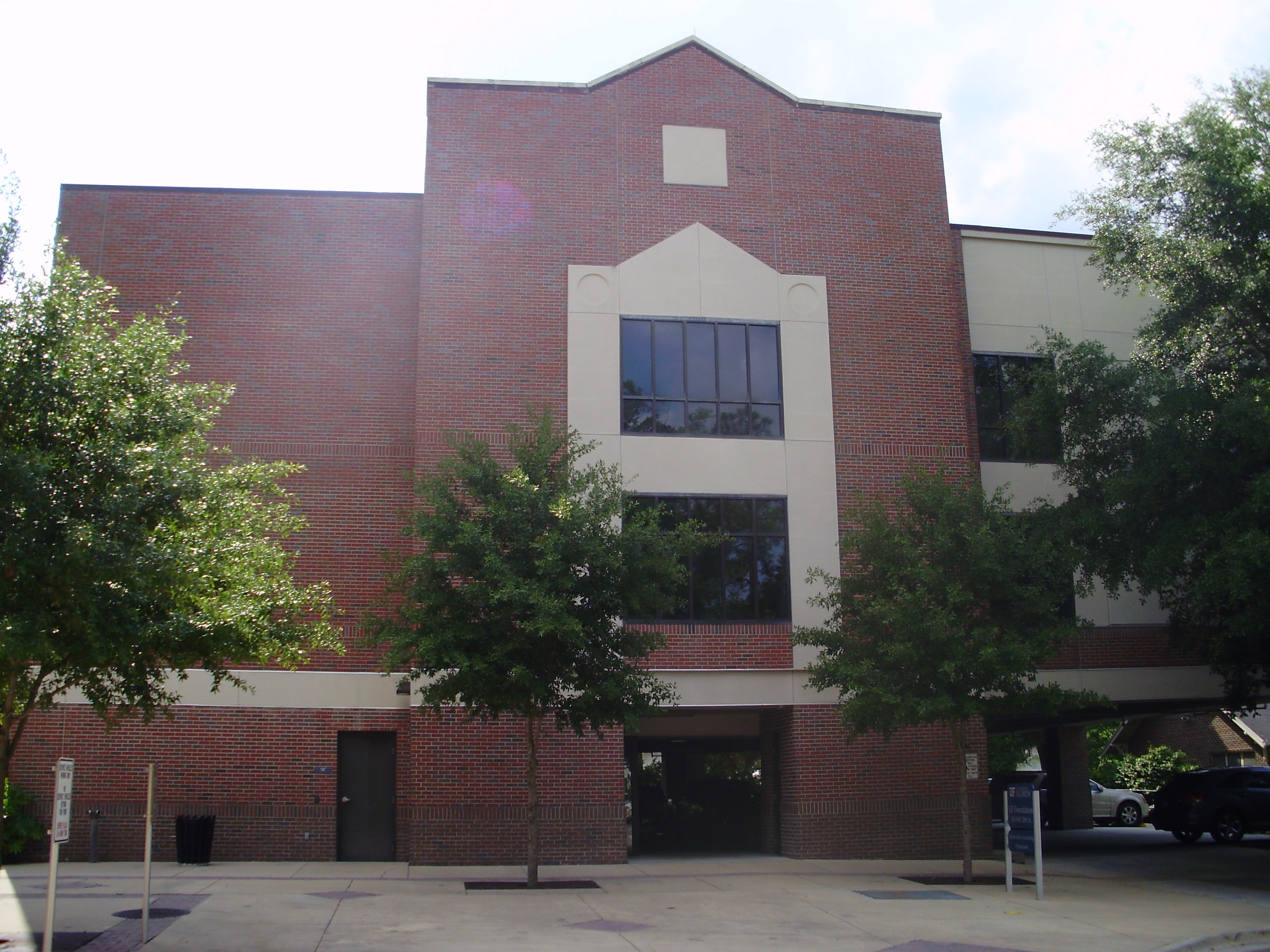
- Type: Nonprofit
- Industry: Finance and Insurance
- Founded: 2004
- Headquarters: Gainesville, Florida
- Key people: Earl W. Powell, Chairman; Doug Wynkoop, President
- Website: www.ufico.ufl.edu

The University of Florida Investment Corporation (UFICO) is a wholly owned subsidiary of the University of Florida, charged with managing the university's endowment, foundations, research endeavors, and the University Athletic Association.

This organization is governed by their own board of directors, which are appointed by the University of Florida Board of Trustees. The trustees chose Earl W. Powell in 2004 to be the chairman.

== See also ==
- University of Florida Alumni Association
- Board of Trustees at the University of Florida
