= Leigh Hall =

- Leigh Hall (Chemistry-Pharmacy Building)
- U.S. Historic district – Contributing property
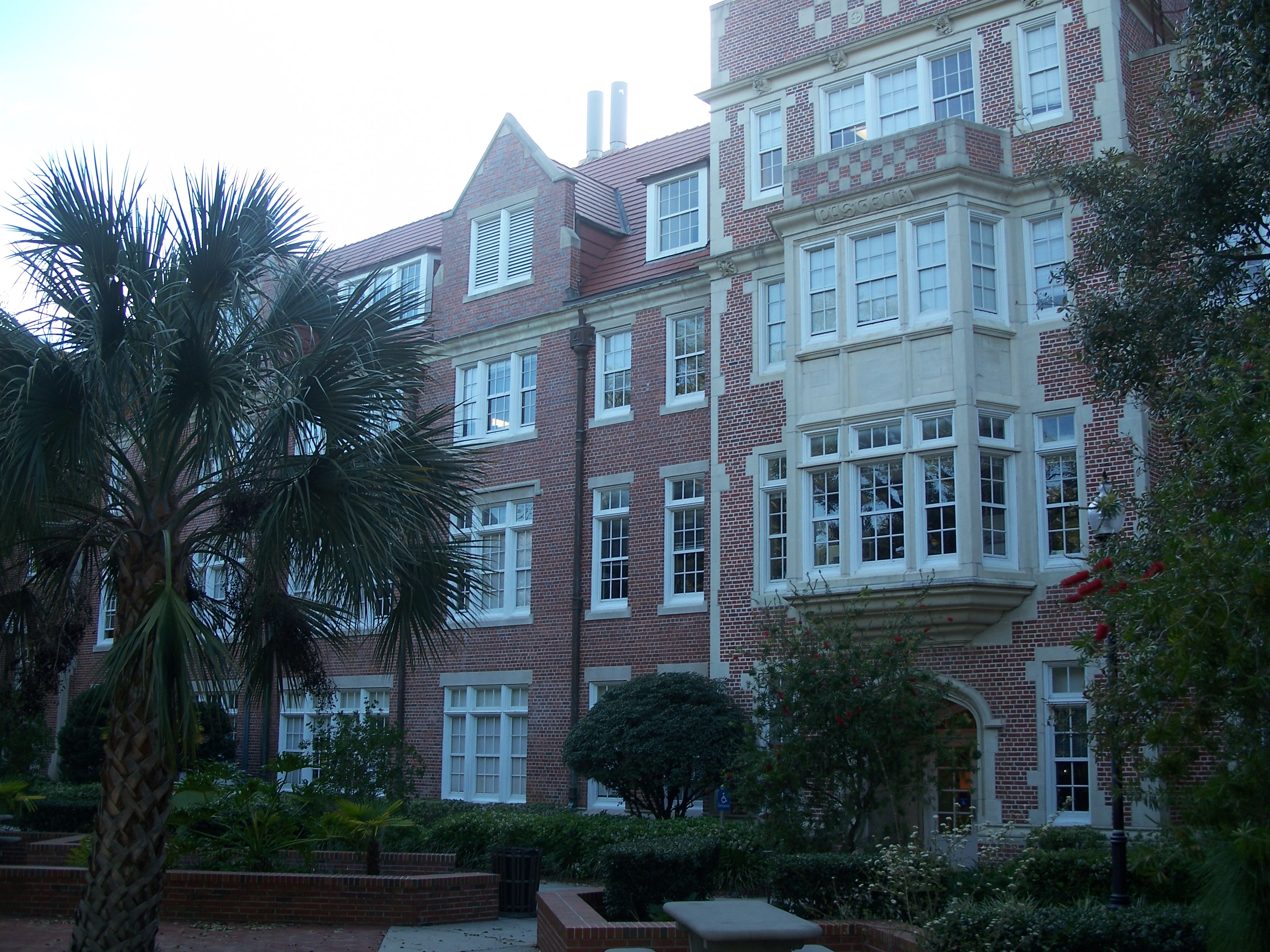

- Location within Florida Location within the United States
- Location: Gainesville, Florida
- Coordinates: 29°39′2″N 82°20′39″W
- Built: 1927
- Architect: Rudolph Weaver
- Architectural style: Late Gothic Revival

The Leigh Hall, originally known as the Chemistry-Pharmacy Building, is an historic building on the campus of the University of Florida in Gainesville, Florida, in the United States. It was designed by Rudolph Weaver in the Collegiate Gothic style and was built in 1927. In 1949 the pharmacy college moved to new quarters and the building was renamed Leigh Hall for Townes R. Leigh, longtime chairman of the chemistry department. A west wing was added in 1949 and the building was renovated in 1994.

Leigh Hall is a contributing property in the University of Florida Campus Historic District which was added to the National Register of Historic Places on April 20, 1989.

== History ==
In 1926 the department of chemistry at the University of Florida had grown substantially that the enrollment included about 700 students with a faculty of four professors, two assistant professors, a full-time curator, four fellows, and fourteen assistants spread across several buildings. At the time, the College of Pharmacy occupied portions of the basement of Science Hall (later renamed Keene-Flint Hall) and Peabody halls with an enrollment of approximately fifty students. New facilities were needed for both colleges and, as such, a new building was proposed to the Florida State Legislature at the projected cost of $350,000 of which the Legislature approved $220,000 for the construction of the first phase for a new building to house both the departments of Chemistry and Pharmacy.

The total plan called for a hollow square design providing for ample daylight by “all passageways to and from various parts of the building open on the light wells inside. The north end of the building will consist of three stories and an attic, while the two wings, south and center will only be two stories high. A basement was considered undesirable because of the difficulty in this locality of keeping a basement dry. The first two floors of the building will be occupied by the department of chemistry. The College of Pharmacy will occupy the third floor.”

The building design was Gothic in style, adorned with the names of famous chemists and pharmacists in raised stone along the cornice of the building: Pasteur, Faraday, Avogadro, Wohler, Schaele, Proust, Cordus, Lavoisier, Perkin, Berzelius, Dalton, Mendeleeff, Curie, Liebig, and then with the 1947 addition, Gibbs, Cavendish, and Power. Also carved in stone on the cornice were gargoyles and the alchemists’ symbols for the elements. These symbols were repeated on the copper rain gutters – and encircled dot for gold (the Sun); a crescent for silver (the Moon); a circle with an arrow for iron (Mars); an encircled X for copper (Venus); the number 4 for tin (Jupiter); and an encircled X with crescent for Mercury (the metal and the planet).

Modern safety considerations were part of the design with, “As far as possible, laboratories have been placed above laboratories and classrooms above classrooms. This system is economical from the standpoint of cost of installing plumbing, and there is practically no danger in a classroom being damaged by a leak overhead.”

The building in 1927 consisting of a 160-foot north wing, three stories in height, with an attic and the one-story main stockroom, but was designed so an additional story for a lecture hall and a laboratory wing could be added which was done in later years. Construction started on October 1926 with the cornerstone being laid December 15, 1926, and completed enough to be occupied in the Fall of 1927. The building when first occupied was only partially finished, there were no electric light fixtures, mastic on the floors, paint on the walls, plaster on the stockroom walls, or varnish on the woodwork. The temporary tar paper roof was replaced by one of tile in 1928. The stockroom woodwork and redwood shelves were finally varnished in 1930.

In the early 1930’s, the one ton bell from the Battleship Florida was installed in a clock atop the roof of Leigh Hall which was struck each hour. With the completion of Century Tower and its electronic bell system in 1956, the Leigh Hall clock was removed, and the bell was put in storage. In 1960, the bell was installed atop the stands in the north end zone at Florida Field, where it was traditionally rung by either cheerleaders or fans at the conclusion of a victory by the Florida Gator football team. The bell was later restored and is now housed in the lobby of the Museum of Florida History.

The stockrooms for the building were of special consideration for its purpose. “The central location and arrangement of the stock rooms are unique features. The stockrooms will be readily accessible to students in all laboratories. The general chemistry laboratory, which demands considerable stock-room service, will be served through two windows from the main stock room. The other large laboratory, qualitative analysis which will be used temporarily by students in organic chemistry also, will be supplied from the smaller stock rooms directly above the main stock room. The efficiency of the stock-room service will be enhanced by elevator or dumb waiter service.”

The long-planned-for auditorium-lecture room was built atop the main stock room in 1938 was an impressive addition at two stories in height, seating 350 students and had two adjoined preparation rooms.

In 1947-1948 a major addition to Leigh Hall was done taking the building to the configuration as it is today. The addition included the west addition, and the fourth and fifth floors. The addition included an elevator by the Otis Elevator Company.

In the summer of 1949 the building was named in honor of after Dr. Townes Randolph Leigh.

Renovations to Leigh Hall were carried out in the 1970’s with the refurbishing of the General and Organic Chemistry teaching laboratories with new benches, hoods and Pyrex drains. Further plans for renovation at the time were never carried out because it was impossible to vacate the building for the renovation. It wasn’t until the 1990’s, with the addition of the new Chemistry Laboratory building, that Leigh Hall was vacated and renovated.

On October 28, 1994, a rededication of the recently $10 million total renovated Leigh Hall was held including the opening of the time capsule sealed in the Leigh Hall cornerstone since 1926. From Dr. Leigh’s dedication speech on December 15, 1926, the time capsule contained a “copper chest with over three score messages from those living to those who will be living centuries hence when it is removed from its ancient seat and the light of an older sun discloses tidings from those long dead.” The chest also contained the catalogue of the College of Pharmacy, December 15 copy of the Gainesville Sun, histories of the Department of Chemistry and College of Pharmacy, the Jubilee Edition of the American Chemical Society, rosters of the Leigh Chemical Society, Mortar and Pestle Society, the Gamma Sigma Epsilon Fraternity, the Biennium Report of the Dean of the College of Pharmacy, material relating to the Florida State Pharmaceutical Association, the roll of classes in Pharmacy and Chemistry, and laboratory lists. The chest also contained a sealed envelope from the Architect that he requested not be opened at the time it was placed into the chest. Dr. Leigh wrote, “The contents of the stone will disclose our head, our heart and our hopes to posterity. How I wish we might read this. They will know us but we will not know them: for the optics of history bring the past into view but there is no lens that we can fix upon the future and bring it into our field of vision.”

== See also ==
- University of Florida
- Buildings at the University of Florida
- Campus Historic District
