= University of Florida Campus Historic District =

Historic district in Florida, United States

- U.S. National Register of Historic Places
- U.S. Historic district
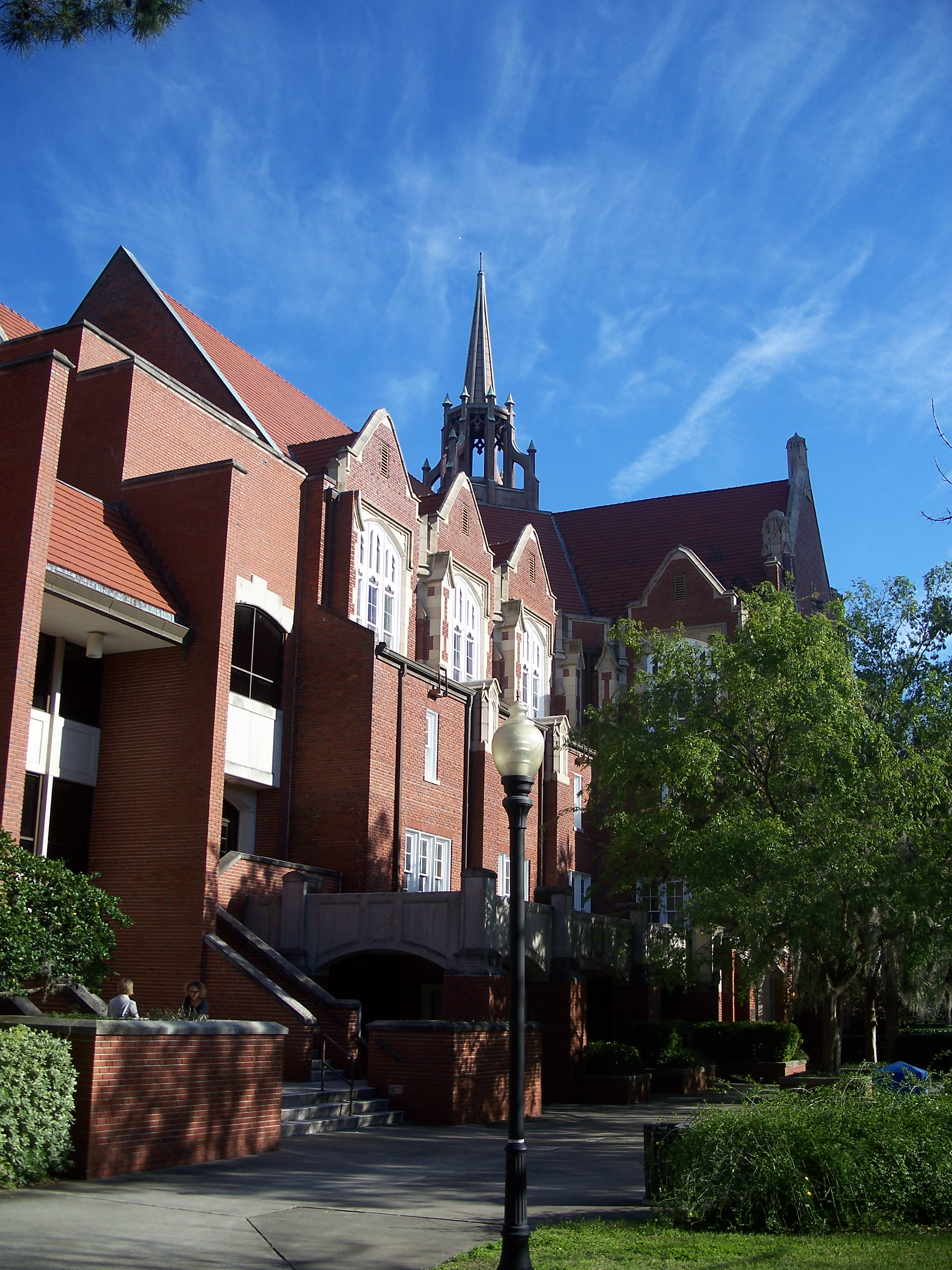
- University Auditorium, a contributing property to the district

- Location within Florida Location within the United States
- Location: Gainesville, Florida
- Coordinates: 29°39′1″N 82°20′38″W
- Area: 650 acres (2.6 km^{2})
- Built: 1906–1939
- Architect: William Augustus Edwards; Rudolph Weaver
- Architectural style: Collegiate Gothic
- NRHP reference No.: 89000322
- Added to NRHP: April 20, 1989

The University of Florida Campus Historic District is a historic district on the campus of the University of Florida in Gainesville, Florida. The district, bounded by West University Avenue, Southwest 13th Street, Stadium Road and Gale Lemerand Drive, encompasses approximately 650 acres (2.6 km^{2}) and contains 11 listed buildings plus contributing properties. On April 20, 1989, it was added to the National Register of Historic Places. On June 24, 2008, additional information was approved which resulted in the addition of 6 contributing properties (5 buildings plus the Plaza of the Americas to the district.)

== Listed buildings in the district ==
Note: These were all designed by William Augustus Edwards, although Rolfs Hall was finished by Rudolph Weaver.

- Anderson Hall, 1913
- Bryan Hall, 1914
- Buckman Hall, 1905–1906
- Flint Hall, 1910
- Griffin-Floyd Hall, 1912
- Smathers Library (Library East), 1926
- Newell Hall, 1910
- Peabody Hall, 1913
- Rolfs Hall, 1927
- Thomas Hall, 1905–1906
- Women's Gymnasium, 1915

== Contributing properties in the district ==
Note: These were designed by Rudolph Weaver, except for University Auditorium, which was designed by William Augustus Edwards.

- Dauer Hall, 1936
- Fletcher Hall, 1938–1939
- Infirmary, 1931
- Leigh Hall, 1927
- Murphree Hall, 1939
- Sledd Hall, 1930
- University Auditorium, 1922
- Walker Hall, 1927

=== Added in 2008 ===
- Carleton Auditorium, 1954
- Century Tower, 1953
- Tigert Hall, 1949
- Florida Gymnasium, 1949
- Matherly Hall, 1952
- Plaza of the Americas, 1925

== Other campus buildings on the National Register ==
Note: These are outside the district:

- The Hub, Stadium Road between Buckman Drive and Fletcher Drive
- Norman Hall, east of S.W. 13th Street, designed by Rudolph Weaver
- Old WRUF Radio Station (now the University of Florida Police Department headquarters, designed by Rudolph Weaver
- Weil Hall
- Yulee Area

== Destroyed buildings in the district ==
- Johnson Hall (originally known as University Commons) was UFs original dining hall. Located west of Dauer, it was designed by William Augustus Edwards, built 1912 and burned 1987. The Academic Advising Center now occupies the site.
- Old Benton Hall (originally the Engineering Building), was designed by William Augustus Edwards, built 1911 and demolished 1966. Grinter Hall, built in 1971, now occupies the site.
- Original Post Office, third building on campus, demolished before 1977 to make way for General Purpose Building A, now Turlington Hall.

== Campus landscaping ==
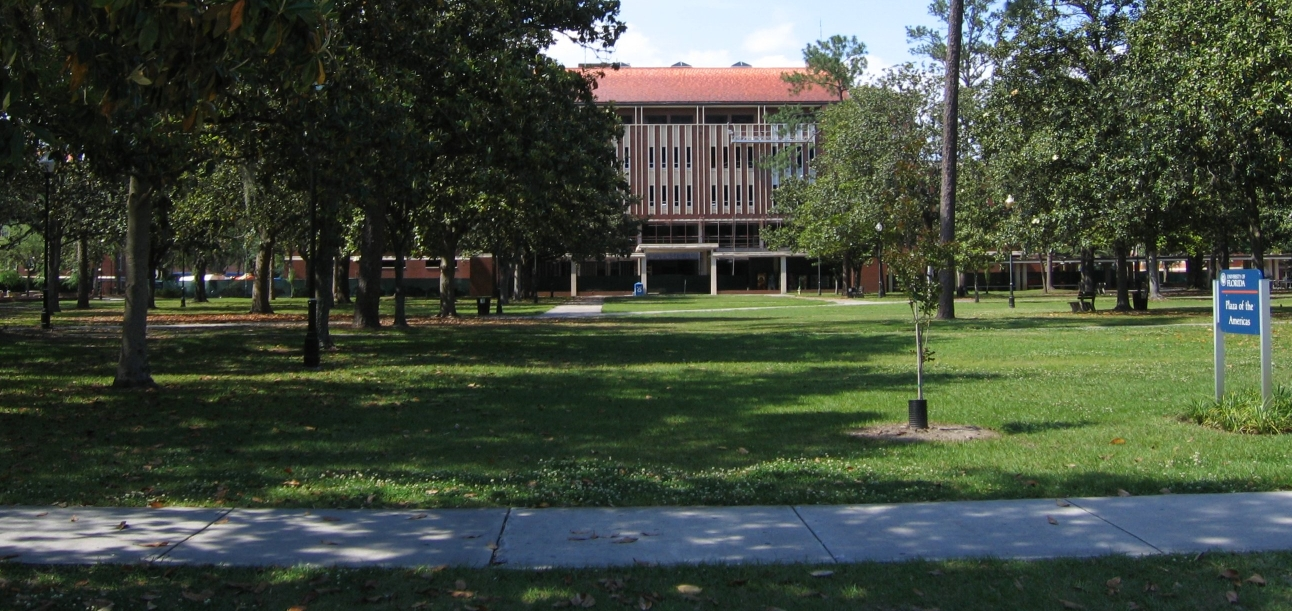
Looking north across the plaza, towards Library West

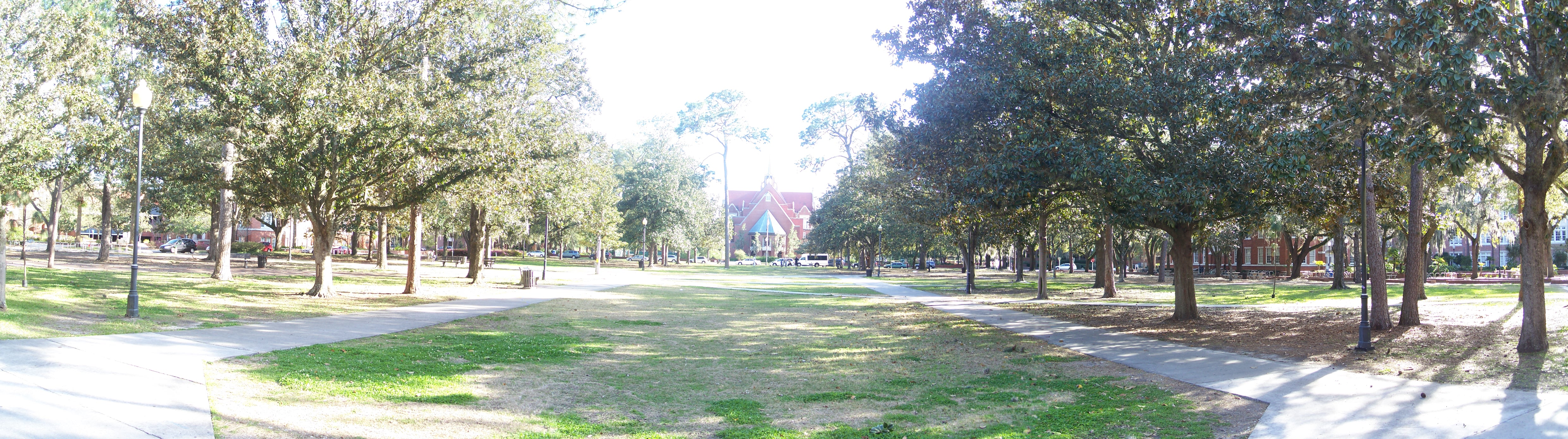
Looking south across the plaza, towards the Auditorium

In 1927 Frederick Law Olmsted Jr. did a landscape plan for UF. In 1931 the central plaza became the Plaza of the Americas.

== See also ==
- Buildings at the University of Florida
- List of Registered Historic Places in Alachua County, Florida
- Murphree Area
