= Dauer Hall =

- Dauer Hall (Florida Union)
- U.S. Historic district – Contributing property
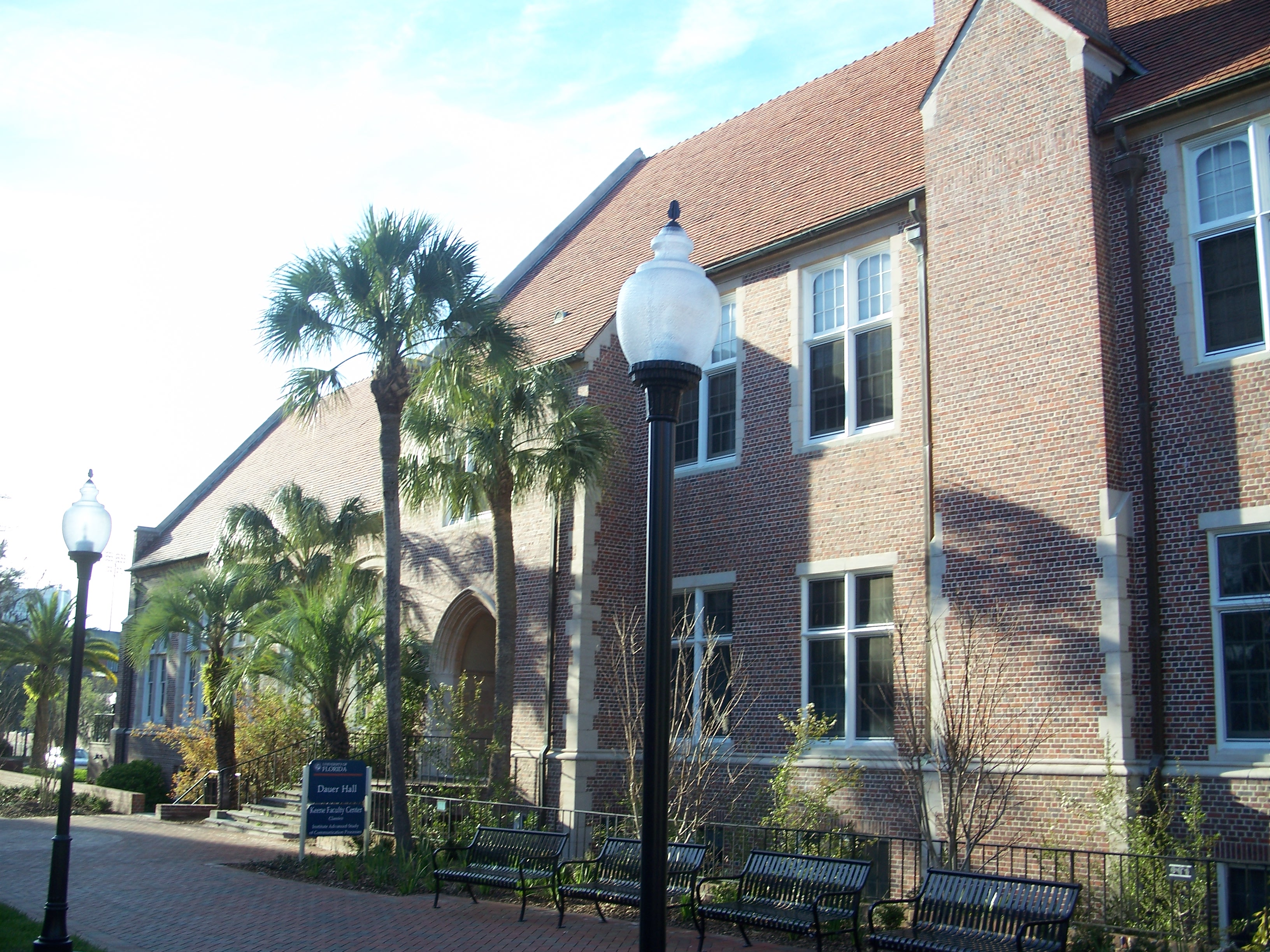

- Location within Florida Location within the United States
- Location: Gainesville, Florida
- Coordinates: 29°38′59″N 82°20′42″W
- Built: 1936
- Architect: Rudolph Weaver
- Architectural style: Late Gothic Revival

Dauer Hall is a historic building on the campus of the University of Florida in Gainesville, Florida, in the United States. The building is currently used by the Astronomy Department

Dauer Hall is a contributing property in the University of Florida Campus Historic District which was added to the National Register of Historic Places on April 20, 1989.

== History ==
Designed by Rudolph Weaver in the Collegiate Gothic architectural style, the building was built in 1936. Because the Great Depression caused a shortage of funds, the building took several years to construct, and its distinctive stained glass windows on the east facade were not placed until 1938. William Jennings Bryan was one fundraiser for the construction of the hall.

Originally the site of the student union, the building was called the Florida Union. The building housed a bookstore, small library, hotel, soda fountain, banquet hall and ballroom (in what later became the Keene Faculty Center, see below), chapel, game room, "sundry ship," and student organization offices (including those of not-yet independent student newspaper, the Florida Alligator, whose officers were in the basement). Later part of the second floor was used by the Religion Department and the YMCA. The Florida Union, moved to the new building on Museum Road (later renamed the J. Wayne Reitz Union) when that building was completed in 1967.

The building was then given to the College of Liberal Arts and Sciences to be used for classrooms and faculty office space, and was renamed the Arts and Sciences Building. The building adopted its current name in 1975 in honor of Manning J. Dauer, the longtime chairman of the political science department.

== Keene Faculty Center ==
The Keene Faculty Center located in the western wing of Dauer Hall is a multipurpose room used mainly by College of Liberal Arts and Sciences faculty.

=== Facilities ===
The high-ceilinged room comprises 1,600 square feet (150 m^{2}) and has wood panelling and flooring as well as arched windows. The main floor consists of a commons room (measuring 32 by 54 feet), a storage room, and a small kitchen. The commons room has couches, easy chairs, 20 trestle table, and 75 dining chairs. Open to faculty and guests weekdays from 9 a.m. to 2:30 p.m. as a coffee, reading, and discussion room, it can be reserved for use in late afternoons, evenings, and on weekends, for other activities, such as dinners (with seating for up to 50), receptions, concerts, lectures, conferences, and meetings.

The gallery on the second floor overlooks the main floor and is used for smaller functions. It can accommodate up to 14 people at a luncheon.

=== History ===
The Keene Faculty Center was built in the late 1930s as the Banquet Hall, and it was the upper part of the two-story Food Services building, connected to Florida Union (Dauer Hall) on the east, and the University Dining Hall on the west. (The University Dining Hall, UF's original dining hall, was designed by William Augustus Edwards and was built in 1912. It was also known as "the Commons" and was later named Johnson Hall. It was destroyed in a fire in 1987 and the Academic Advising Center now occupies the site).

The Banquet Hall opened in 1936 or 1937 and included chandeliers left over from the construction of University Auditorium. Originally the basement part of the room was used as a "short-order café" and bookstore and the upper portion was used for banquets.

During World War II, Army officer trainees that lived in UF residence halls used the room as a mess hall. After the war, the hall was designated part of the Florida Union and became known as the Florida Union Social Room. Most "large University dinner events" shifted to The Hub after that building was completed in 1950, but the Union Social Room was still use for banquets occasionally, such as for the annual Caribbean Conference.

In the 1950s and 1960s, the room was used as a ballroom and for student activities, including information fairs, student elections, and pep rallies. William E. Rion, an early director of the Florida Union, said that "smaller campus dances" were held almost every Friday night, with "street dances right outside for the larger crowds." Bands would play music from the balcony down to guests below. A series of international dinners was also held in the room.

After the Florida Union moved to Museum Road in 1967 (where it remains as the J. Wayne Reitz Union), Dauer Hall was given to the College of Liberal Arts and Sciences to alleviate a critical shortage of classroom and office space, and from 1970 to 1997, Social Room was a language lab with close to 50 listening stations.

The Social Room was restored to its early 20th-century appearance in a $500,000 project funded by Kenneth and Janet Keene, for whom the room was renamed. The restored room was dedicated on November 12, 1998.

== See also ==
- University of Florida
- Buildings at the University of Florida
- Campus Historic District
