= Rudolph Weaver =

American architect

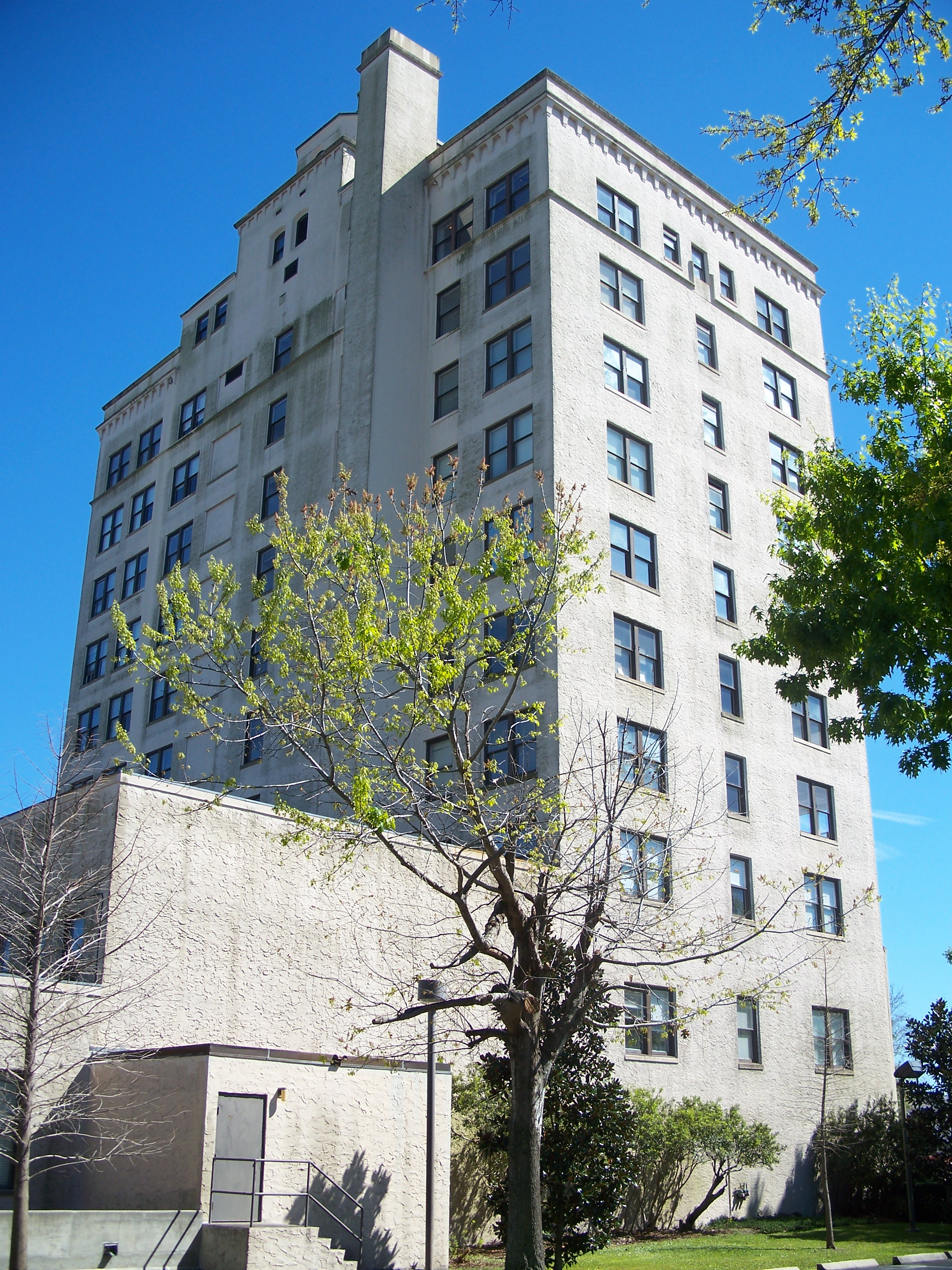
- Seagle Building, Gainesville
- Born: April 17, 1880; Johnstown, Pennsylvania
- Died: November 10, 1944 (aged 64); Gainesville, Florida
- Occupation: Architect
- Buildings: Dauer Hall; Landis Hall, Florida State University

Rudolph Weaver (April 17, 1880 – November 10, 1944) was an American architect, university professor and administrator renowned for various buildings that he designed in Florida, Idaho and Washington, many of which are academic.

== Early life, work and education ==
Weaver was born in Johnstown, Pennsylvania, the son of Henry Weaver and his wife, Sara Jane Barnhart. Before college he worked as a bookbinder, printer and steelworker. He attended Pennsylvania State College for the year 1902-03 and then went to Drexel Institute where he received a diploma in architecture in 1905. He continued his study of architecture at Columbia University from 1906 to 1907, and at the atelier of Henry Hornbostel of the Society of Beaux-Arts Architects in 1907. He later received a Bachelor of Science degree in engineering from Drexel in 1919.

== Career history and works ==
=== Illinois ===
From 1909 to 1911, Weaver was an instructor in architecture at the University of Illinois.

=== Washington ===
From 1911 to 1923, he was the first chairman of the architecture department at what is now Washington State University in Pullman, Washington, and was the first architect for the institution. He designed seven buildings, including:

- The Beef Barn, now the Lewis Alumni Centre, 1922
- Carpenter Hall, which was not finished until 1927.
- Community Hall. 1921
- McCroskey Hall, 1920
- President's House, 1912.
- Stimson Hall, 1922
- Wilson Hall, 1917, first used, but not finished until later.

=== Idaho ===
From 1923 to 1925 he held the same positions at the University of Idaho in Moscow, Idaho, where he did the campus plan and in 1923 designed the Science Building, now Life Sciences South.

=== Florida ===
From 1925 until his death in 1944 he was founding dean of University of Florida's College of Architecture. During that time he was also the architect for the Florida Board of Control, which governed the state's three institutions of higher education and the Florida School for the Deaf and Blind. As board architect, Weaver succeeded William Augustus Edwards, the first architect to the board, and continued designing buildings in the Collegiate Gothic style begun by Edwards. Among the buildings he designed are:

==== Gainesville ====
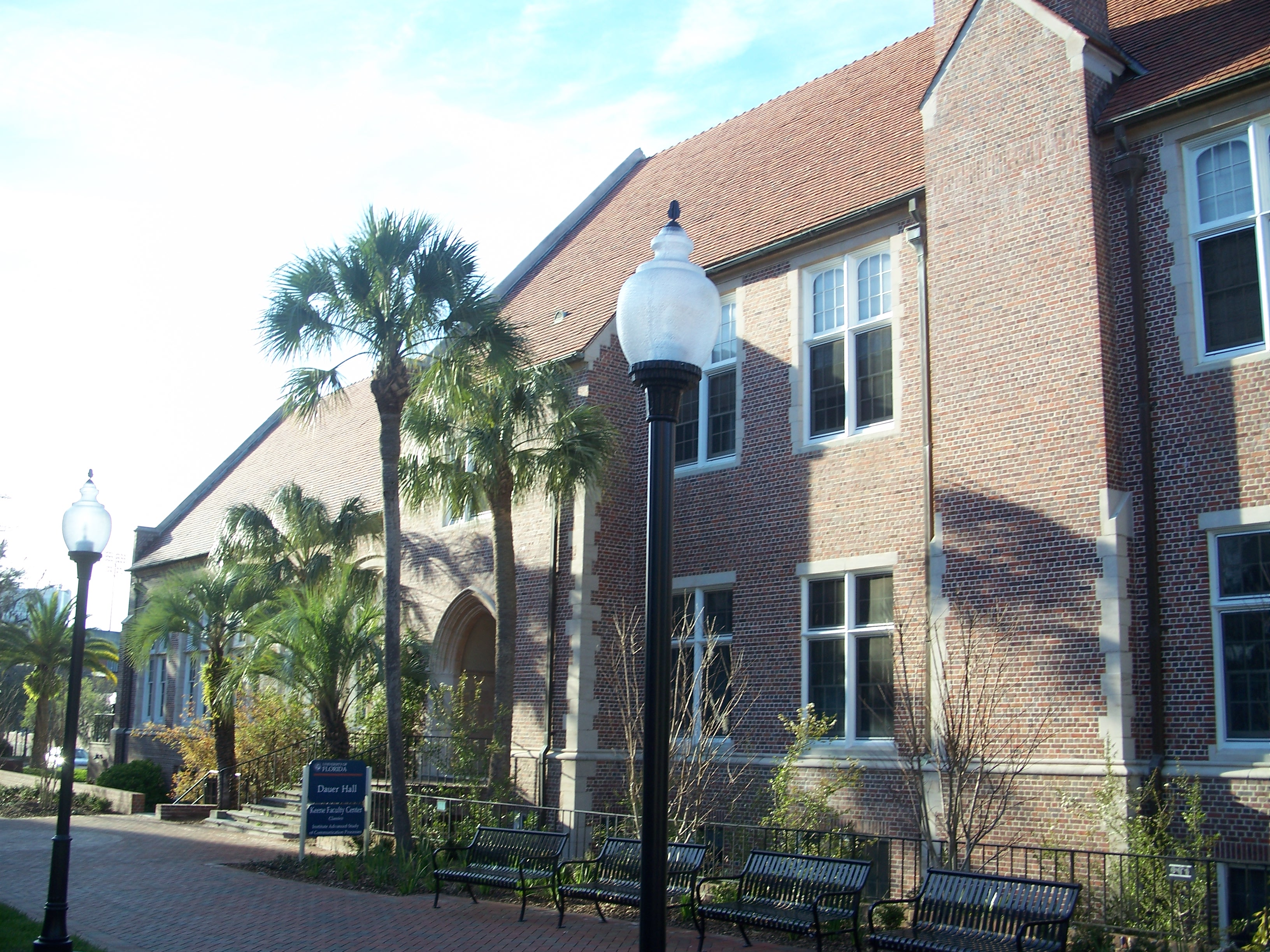
Dauer Hall, formerly the Florida Union

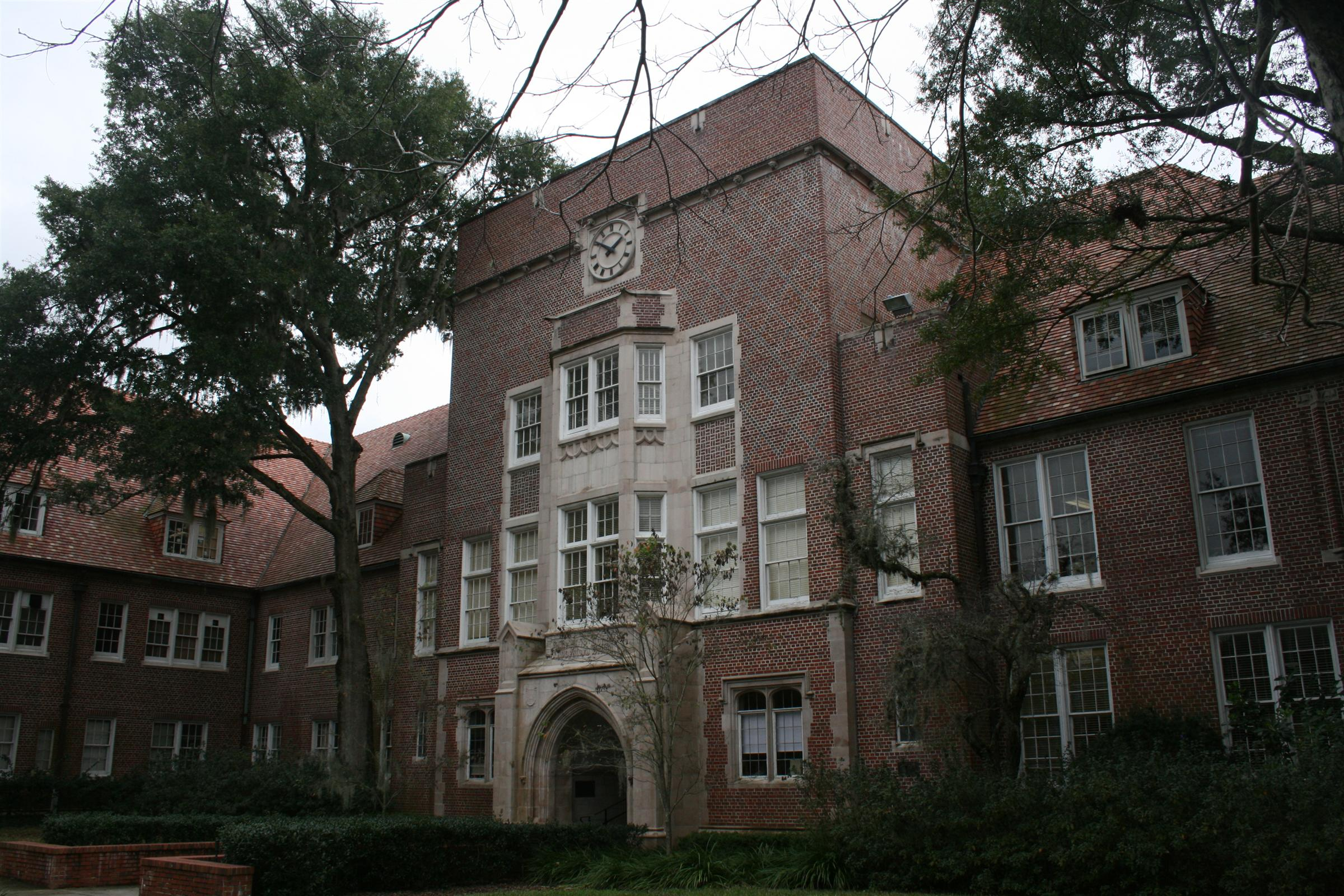
Old P. K. Yonge Laboratory School, now Norman Hall

- The following buildings in the University of Florida Campus Historic District:

- Dauer Hall, 1936
- Fletcher Hall, 1938–1939
- Infirmary, 1931
- Leigh Hall, 1927
- Murphree Hall, 1939
- Sledd Hall, 1930
- Rolfs Hall, designed by Edwards, finished by Weaver
- Walker Hall, 1927

- Other campus buildings on the National Register

- Norman Hall, east of S.W. 13th Street
- Old WRUF Radio Station (now University Police Department)

- Other campus buildings not on the National register:
  - Dairy Sciences Building, now Building 120, 1937
- Private buildings off campus include:
  - Chapel of the Incarnation - Episcopal Chapel House, 1522 West University Avenue
  - Dixie Hotel (now John F. Seagle Building), 408 West University Avenue, 1926.

==== St. Augustine ====
- Florida School for the Deaf and Blind

==== Tallahassee ====
===== FAMU =====
Florida Agricultural and Mechanical College (Florida A&M University)

- Lee Hall 1928

===== FSU =====
Florida State College for Women (Florida State University): Campus buildings designed by Rudolph Weaver include:

- Cawthon Hall, 1946–1948, built after Weaver's death, based on his drawings. It was the last Gothic building at FSU. His designs were followed so closely that even the FSCW stone relief at one entrance was not changed to use the new initials: FSU.
- Gilchrist Hall, 1926
- Landis Hall, 1939
- Longmire Alumni Building, 1938

== Marriage ==
On August 22, 1922, Rudolph Weaver married Alice Rossing Walden.

== Death ==
Rudolph Weaver died in Gainesville in 1944 and was buried in Evergreen Cemetery. His wife, Alice, died on July 26, 1960, and was buried next to him.

== Honors ==
Rudolph Weaver Hall at the University of Florida was named for him, but is now called Fine Arts Building A and houses the UF Architecture & Fine Arts Library. There is also a Weaver Residence Hall, which some UF sites say was named for him, while others say it was named for his wife, Martha. Since his wife was named Alice and survived him, it appears that the first version is correct.
