= Carleton Auditorium =

- U.S. Historic district – Contributing property
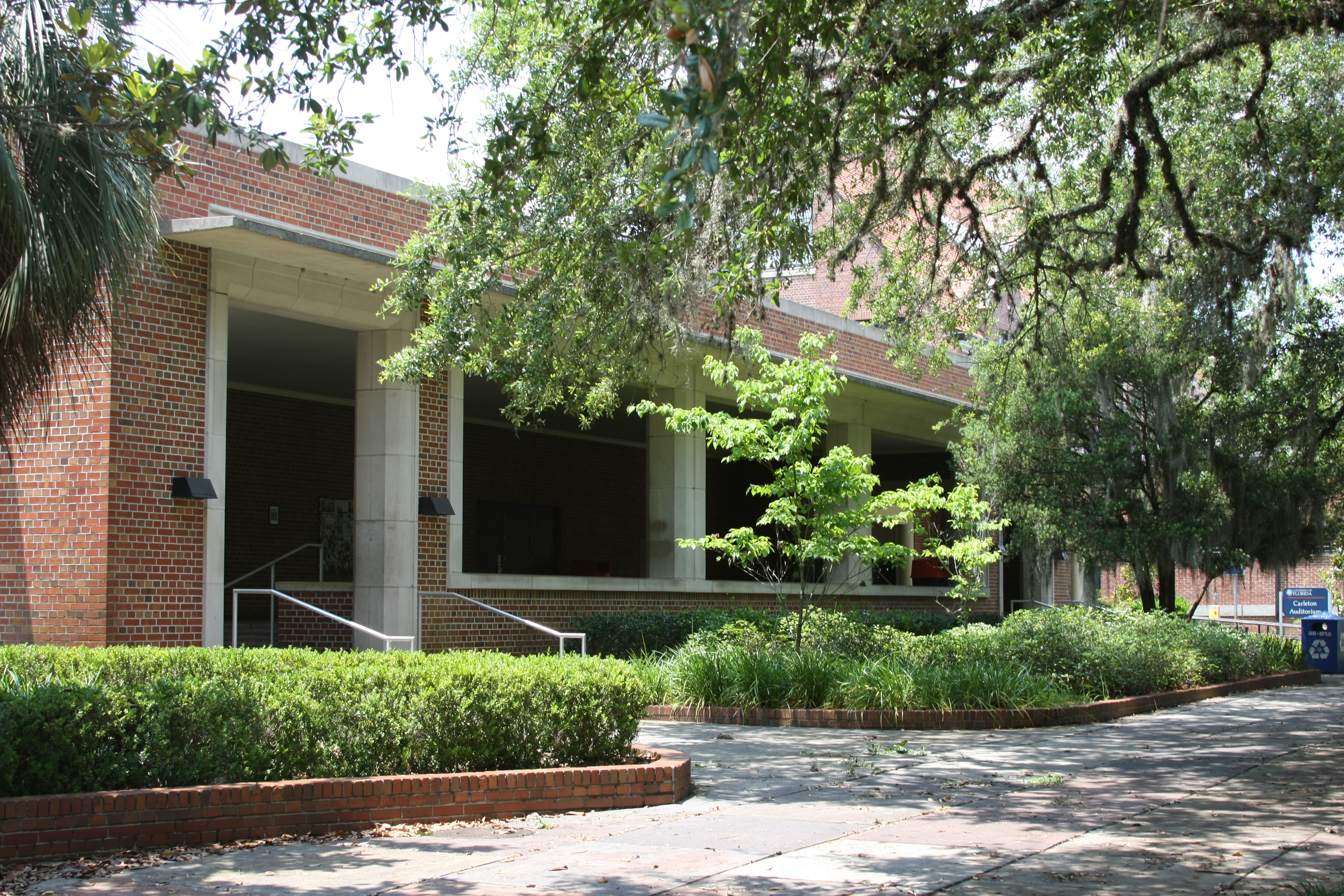

- Location within Florida Location within the United States
- Location: Gainesville, Florida
- Coordinates: 29°38′57″N 82°20′30″W
- Built: 1954
- Architect: Guy Fulton
- Architectural style: campus Brutalist
- Part of: University of Florida Campus Historic District (ID89000322)

The William G. Carleton Auditorium, built in 1954, is a historic building on the campus of the University of Florida in Gainesville, Florida, in the United States. Like several other buildings on campus, it was designed by architect Guy Fulton in an early campus Brutalist style, and it is joined to Walker Hall by a breezeway. It seats 680 and was used as a lecture hall for the University College (predecessor to the College of Liberal Arts and Sciences). In 1970, it was renamed for William G. Carleton, longtime professor of history and social sciences known for the colorful presentation of his freshman "American Institutions" lectures.

In 2008 Carleton Auditorium became a contributing property in the University of Florida Campus Historic District which was added to the National Register of Historic Places on April 20, 1989.

== See also ==
- University of Florida
- Buildings at the University of Florida
- Campus Historic District
