= Anderson Hall (Gainesville, Florida) =

- U.S. National Register of Historic Places
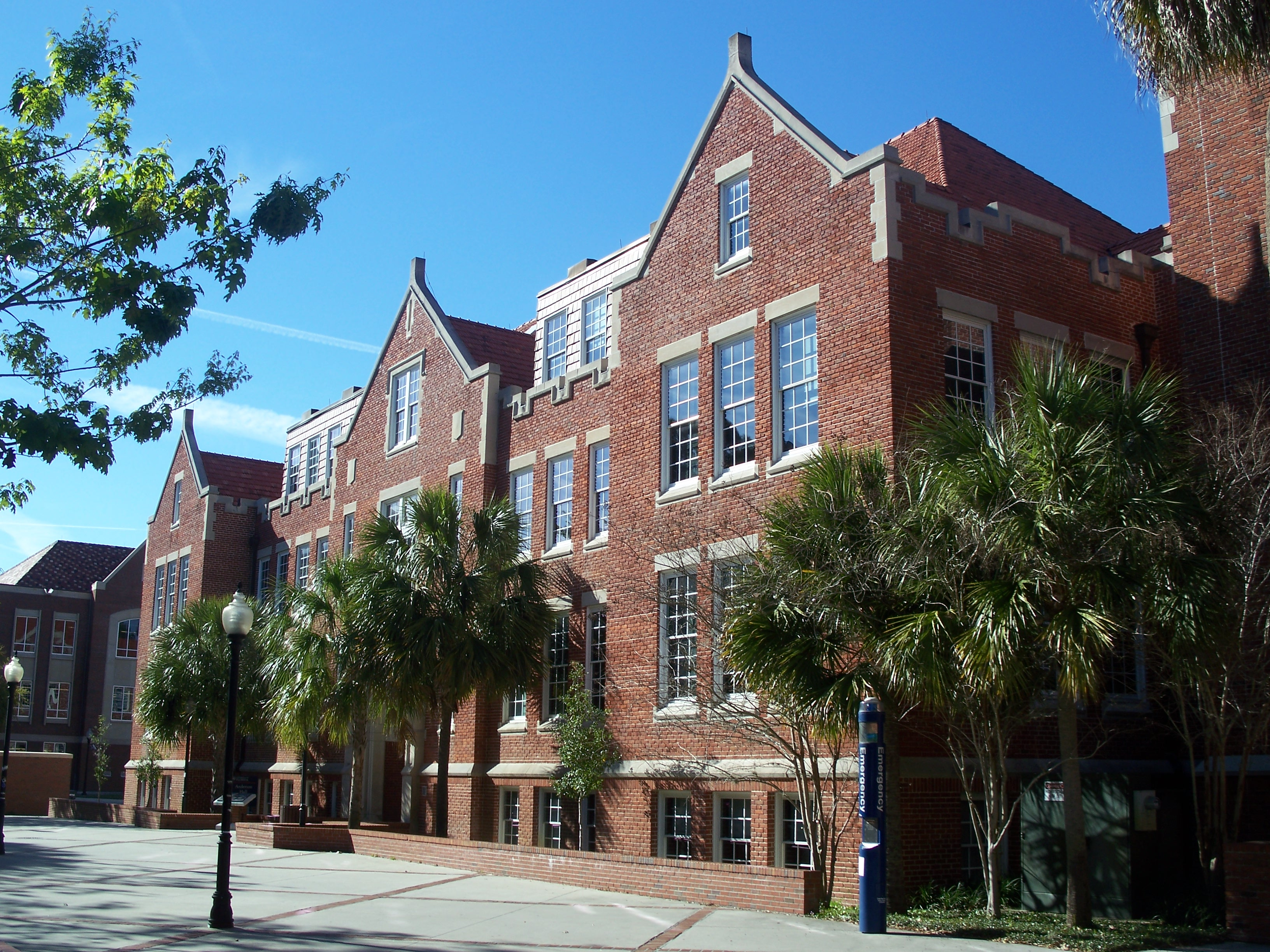

- Location within Florida Location within the United States
- Location: Gainesville, Florida
- Coordinates: 29°39′5″N 82°20′32″W
- Built: 1912–13
- Architect: William Augustus Edwards of Edwards & Saywards
- Architectural style: Collegiate Gothic
- Restored: 2000
- Part of: University of Florida Campus Historic District
- NRHP reference No.: 79000652
- Added to NRHP: June 27, 1979

Anderson Hall is a historic building located in the northeastern section of the University of Florida campus in Gainesville, Florida. The building houses the university's political science and religion departments, both a part of the College of Liberal Arts and Sciences. Anderson Hall was designed by William Augustus Edwards, responsible for planning nearly all of the campus' early buildings, in Collegiate Gothic style. Construction began in 1912, and the building opened in October 1913 as Language Hall.

On June 27, 1979, it was added to the U.S. National Register of Historic Places. It is also a part of the University of Florida Campus Historic District, which was added to the National Register of Historic Places on April 20, 1989.

== Namesake ==
In 1949, Anderson Hall was named after James Nesbitt Anderson, the first dean of the University of Florida College of Arts and Sciences and the first dean of the Graduate School at the University of Florida.

His family continued the legacy at the University of Florida by attending school throughout the generations.

His great-grandson, Joseph Gaa Anderson, attended graduate school there.

His great-granddaughter, Erica Anderson Rooney, graduated from the College of Health and Human Performance with her B.S., and her M.S. in 2007 and 2008.

== Gallery ==
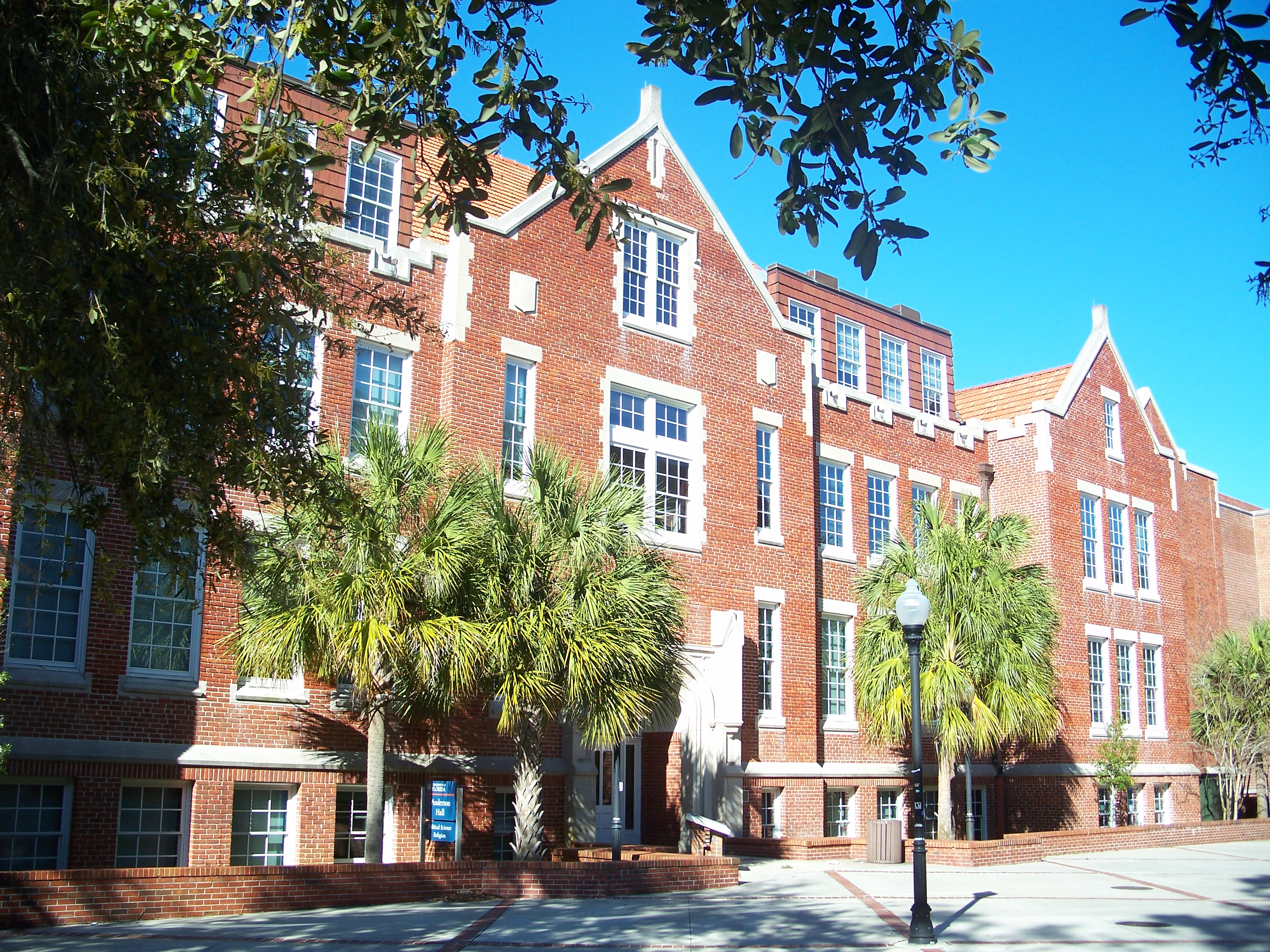

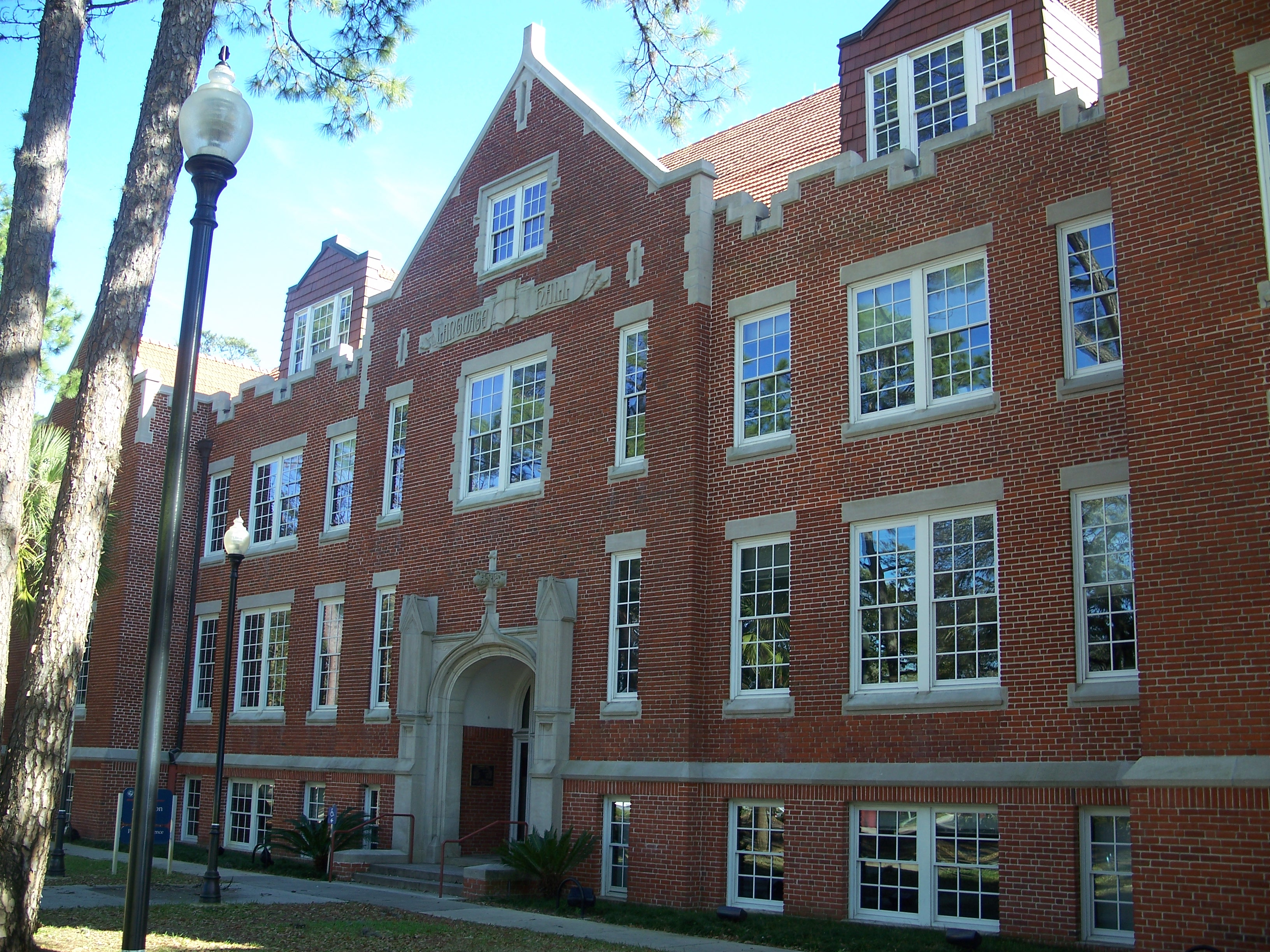

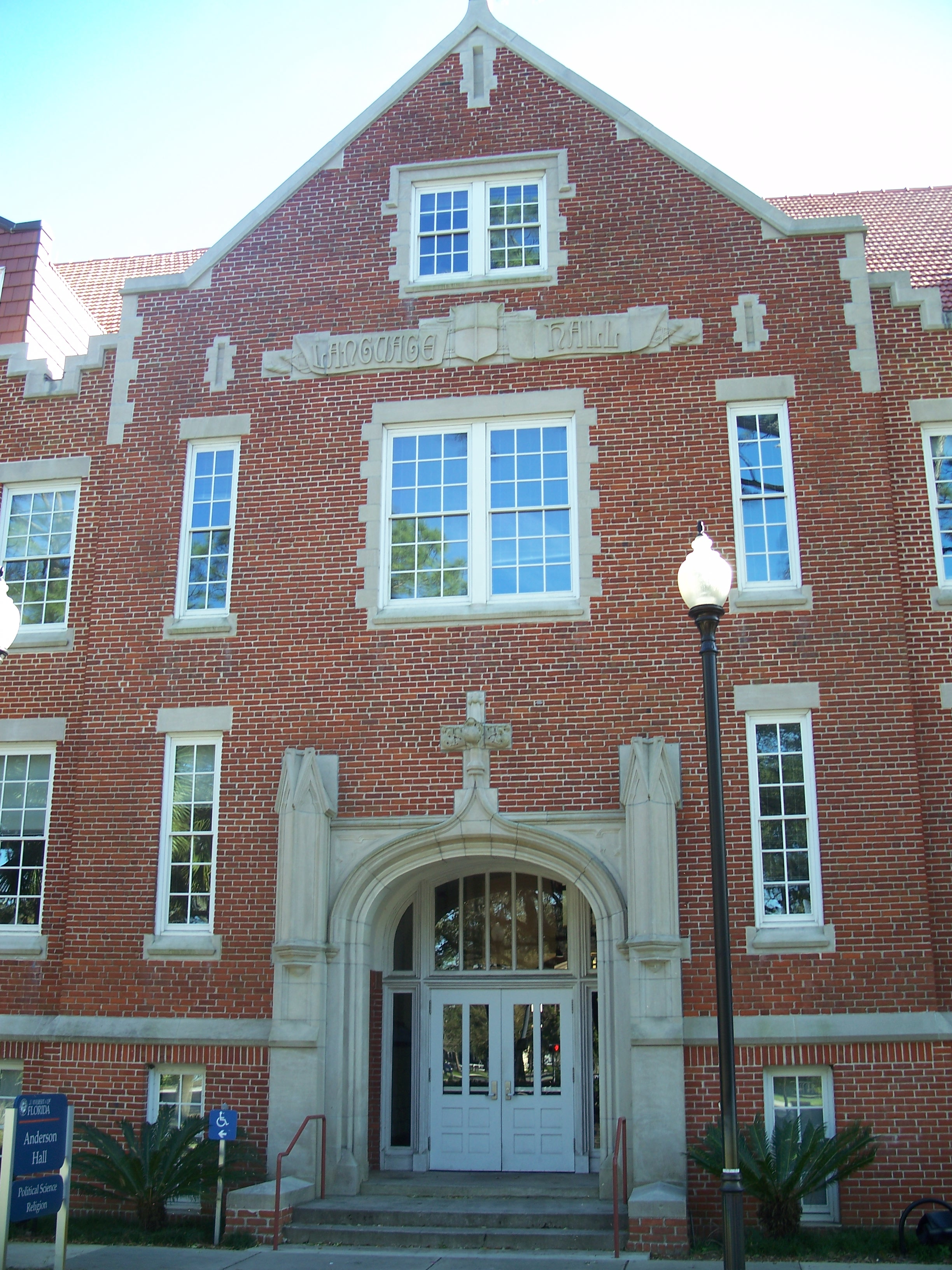

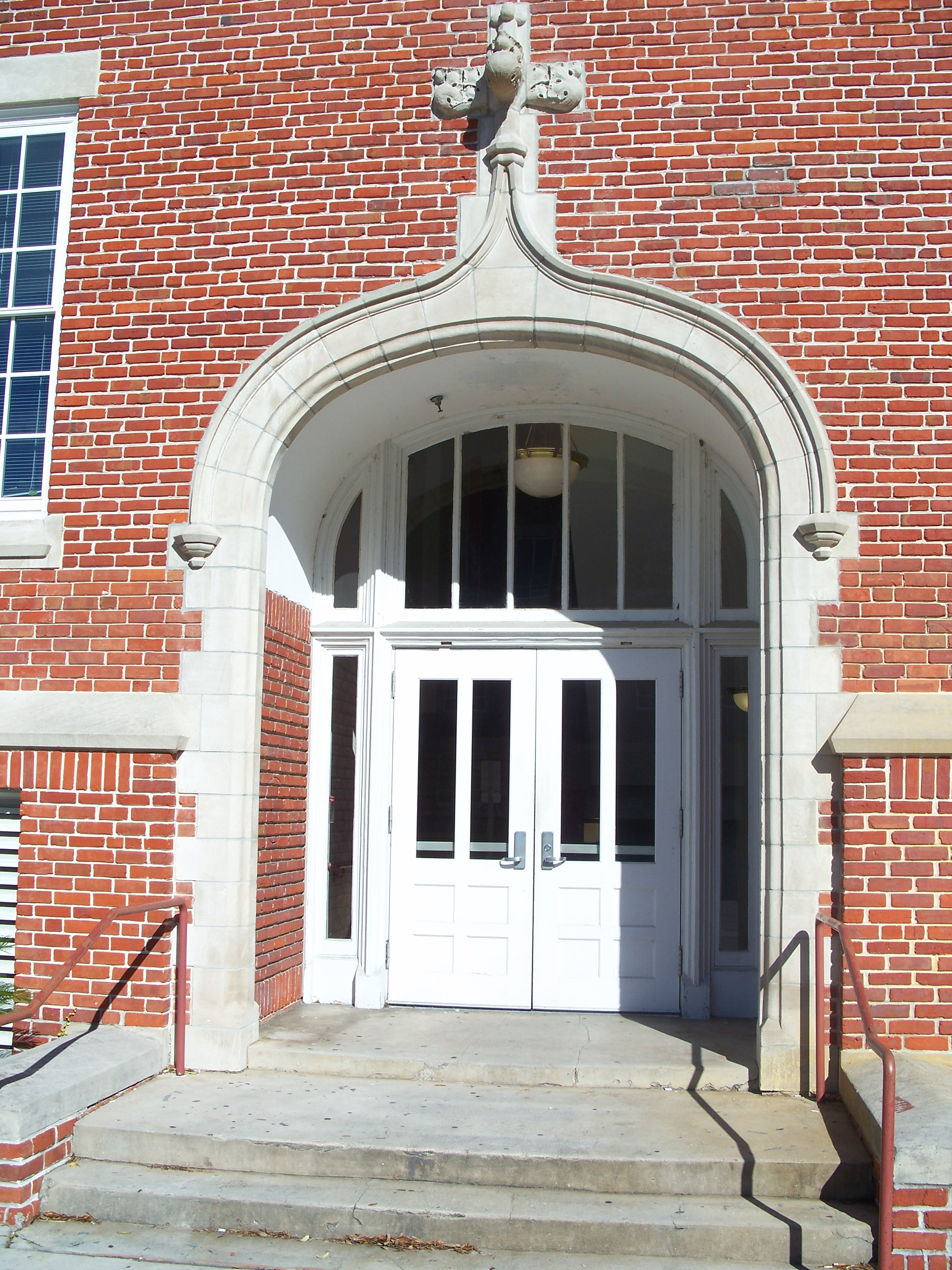

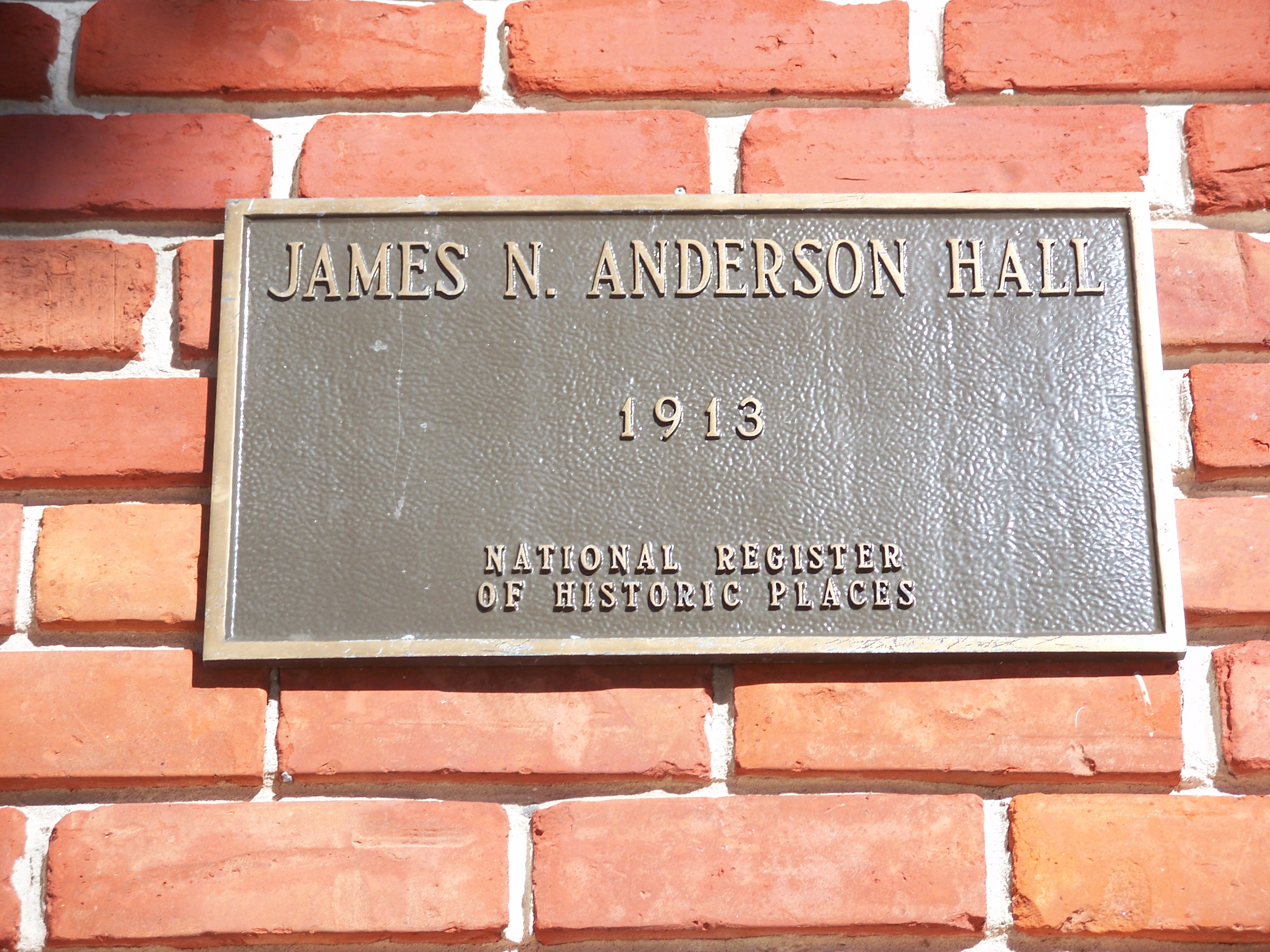

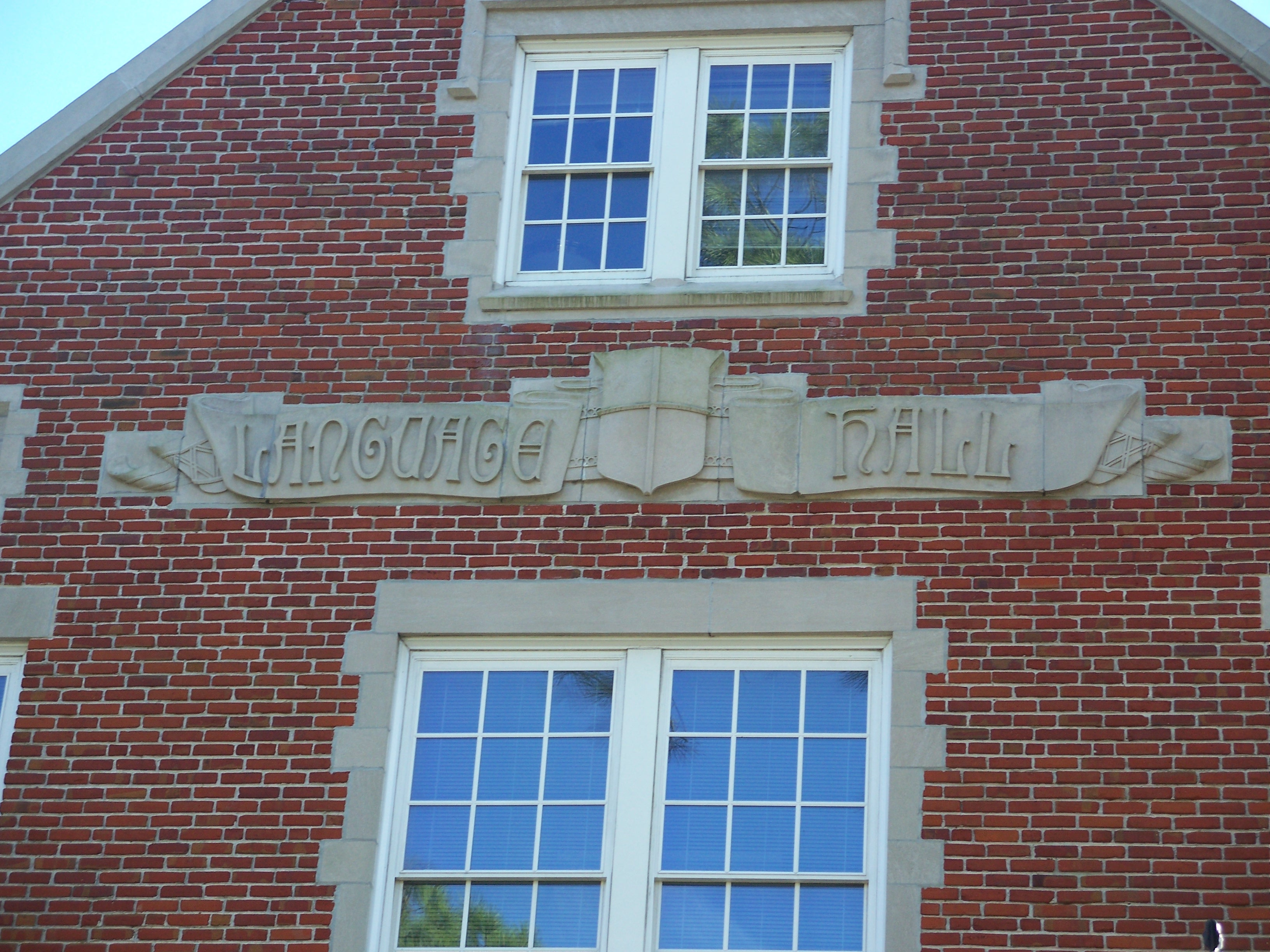

== See also ==
- Buildings at the University of Florida
