= Seagle Building =

- Dixie Hotel, Hotel Kelley
- U.S. National Register of Historic Places
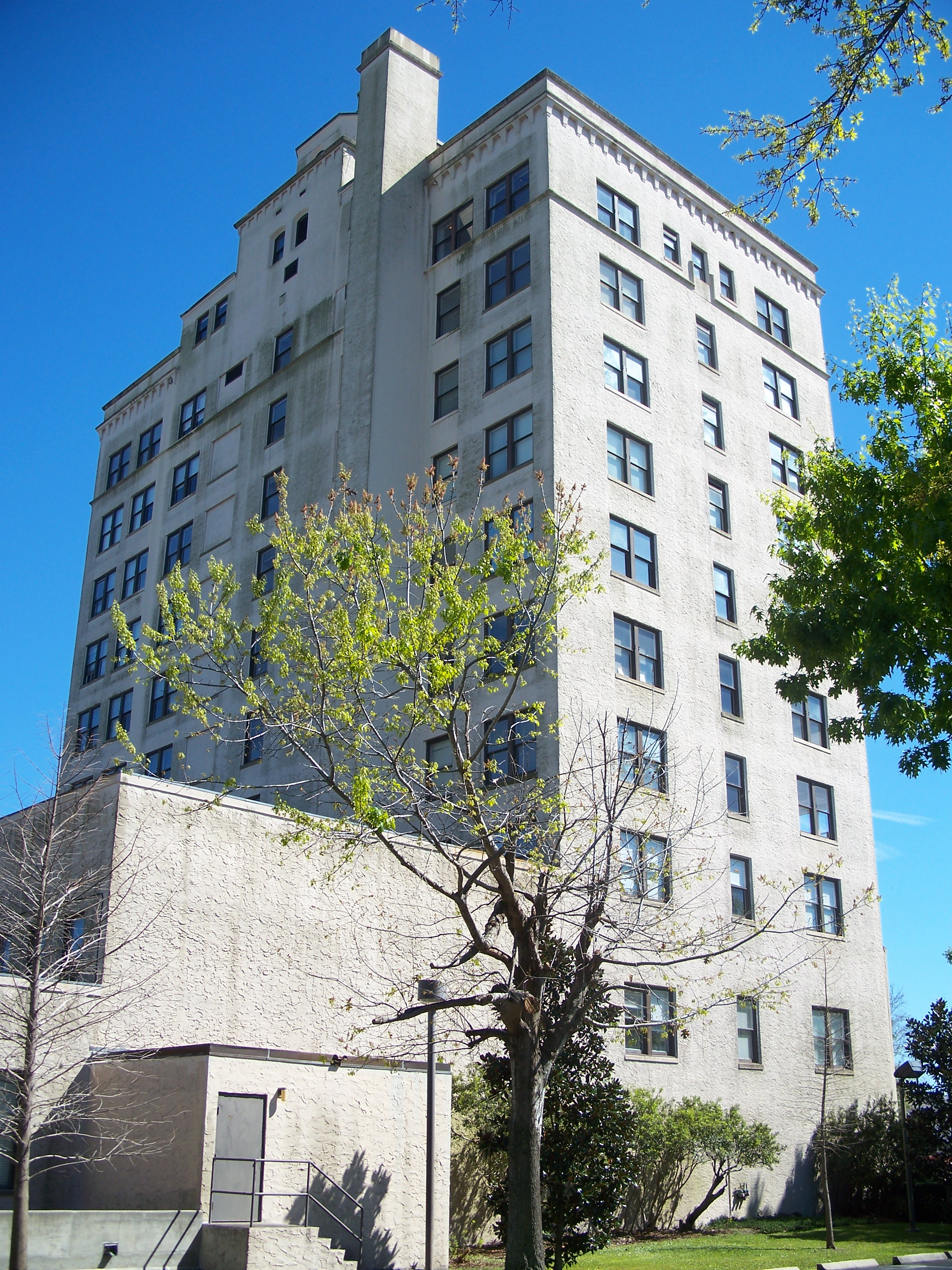

- Location within Florida Location within the United States
- Location: Gainesville, Florida
- Coordinates: 29°39′7″N 82°19′44″W
- Built: 1926
- Architect: Rudolph Weaver; G. Lloyd Preacher & Company
- NRHP reference No.: 82002369
- Added to NRHP: August 16, 1982

The John F. Seagle Building (also known as Hotel Kelley or the Dixie Hotel) is a historic building located at 408 West University Avenue in Gainesville, Florida, in the United States. Built in 1926, it was designed by noted University of Florida architect and professor Rudolph Weaver and built by G. Lloyd Preacher & Company.

On August 16, 1982, it was added to the National Register of Historic Places as the Dixie Hotel, Hotel Kelley.

== History ==
The Seagle Building had its origins in the 1920s economic boom, especially the Florida land boom of the 1920s. Conceived originally as the "Hotel Kelly", the project went bust before the last floor was poured. It sat unfinished for over a decade and was considered an eyesore. In the mid-1930s, a Jacksonville entrepreneur, Georgia Seagle finally finished the building, with assistance from the University of Florida, the city of Gainesville, and federal funding. Seagle gave the building to the University of Florida and asked that it be named after her deceased brother, John F. Seagle.

The Seagle Building played a notable, albeit secretive role in WW2, where electrical engineers from the University of Florida developed certain components of the technology behind the proximity fuse. The proximity fuse was one of the most important technological innovations of World War II, enabling the automatic detonation of an explosive device when in proximity of its target. This quote is from the March 1947 Florida Citizens Committee on Education, Tallahassee, Florida, a blue-ribbon commission about the future of education in Florida after WW2: “Research work in the College of Engineering is carried on through the Florida Engineering and Industrial Experiment Station which is an integral part of the college... The service of the Experiment Station to the war effort was noteworthy. Of particular interest was the development and construction of equipment for static direction finding and the development of the proximity fuse both of which played important parts in the winning of the war.”

During the late 1960s, there were floors in the Seagle Building that had undistinguished office titles, and military personnel would meet visitors in the lobby. This was during the height of the Vietnam War.

The building served mostly the University of Florida in the years following its completion. Having difficulty meeting modern fire codes as time passed, the building lost most of its upper-floor tenants. By the late 1960s, the Florida State Museum was the building's only occupant. When that museum moved to the UF campus nearby, the building was completely abandoned.

Eventually sold to a development company from Kentucky for $1 with the understanding that the building was to be completely renovated, a newly remodeled Seagle Building reopened in 1983 with modern wiring, plumbing, telephone and cable jacks, a fire sprinkler system, an emergency diesel generator, an added internal concrete stairway providing two fire escapes for every floor, and many other improvements. The first six floors have been designated commercial space, comprising roughly 40,000 square feet (3,700 m^{2}). The remaining five floors are residential units, with four units per floor with the exception of the top floor, which is a single unit.

== See also ==
- University of Florida
- Buildings at the University of Florida
