= Infirmary (Gainesville, Florida) =

- Infirmary (Student Health Care Center)
- U.S. Historic district – Contributing property
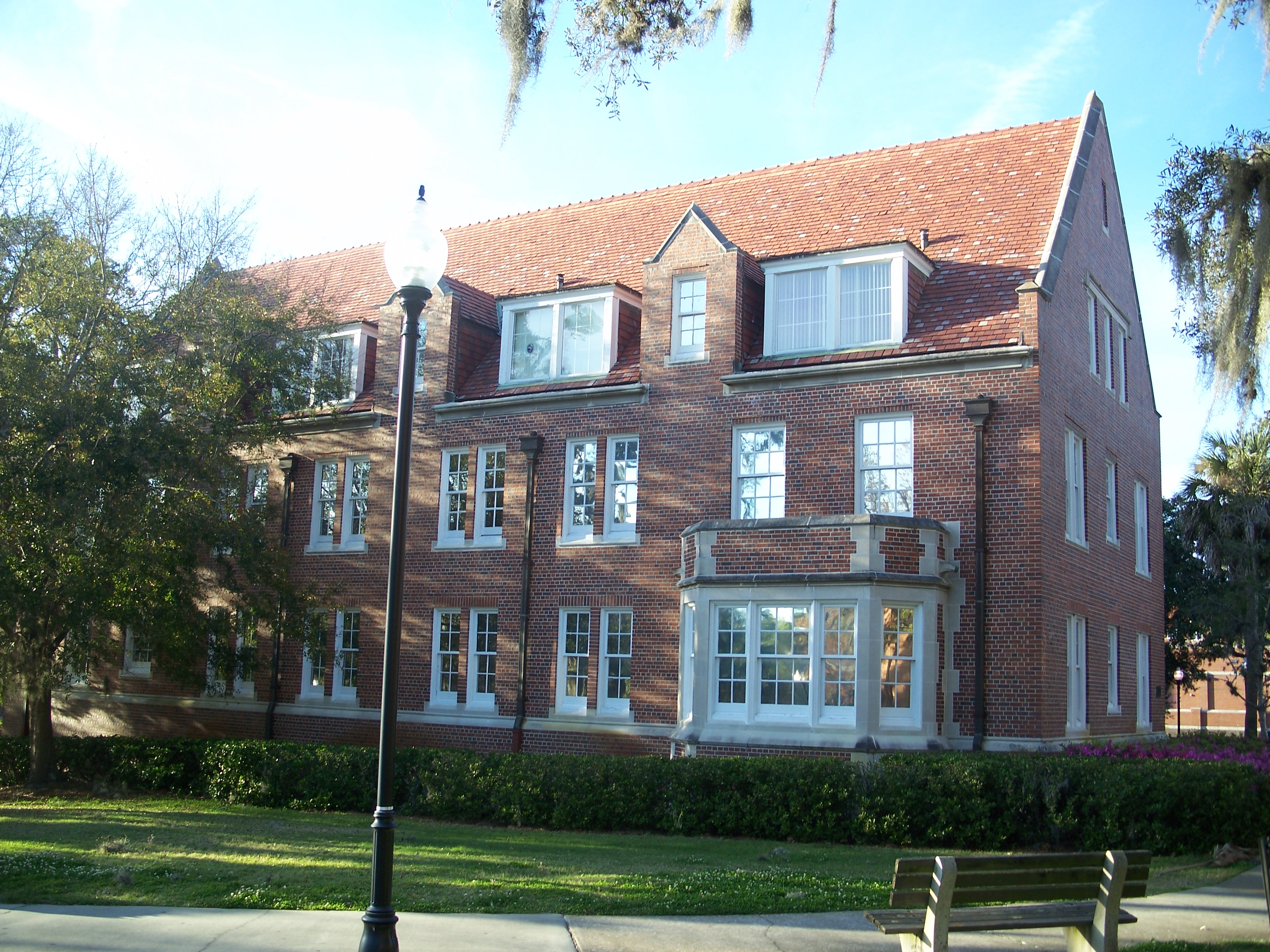

- Location within Florida Location within the United States
- Location: Gainesville, Florida
- Coordinates: 29°38′58″N 82°20′47″W
- Built: 1931
- Architect: Rudolph Weaver
- Architectural style: Late Gothic Revival

The Infirmary, now known as the Student Health Care Center, is a historic building on the campus of the University of Florida in Gainesville, Florida in the United States. It was designed by Rudolph Weaver in the Collegiate Gothic style and built in 1931. Since 1983, it has served as a student outpatient clinic.

The Infirmary is a contributing property in the University of Florida Campus Historic District. On April 20, 1989, it was added to the National Register of Historic Places.

== Accreditation ==
The center was successfully granted its latest three-year Accreditation Association for Ambulatory Health Care (AAAHC) accreditation term (May 31, 2014 through May 30, 2017) on April 21, 2014.

While more than 5,000 ambulatory health care organizations across the U.S. are accredited by the AAAHC, just 220 of those accredited are college health services. The center was first accredited in 1984 by The Joint Commission, later changing to AAAHC accreditation to better match the facility and its services.

== See also ==
- University of Florida
- Buildings at the University of Florida
- Campus Historic District
