= Rolfs Hall =

- U.S. National Register of Historic Places
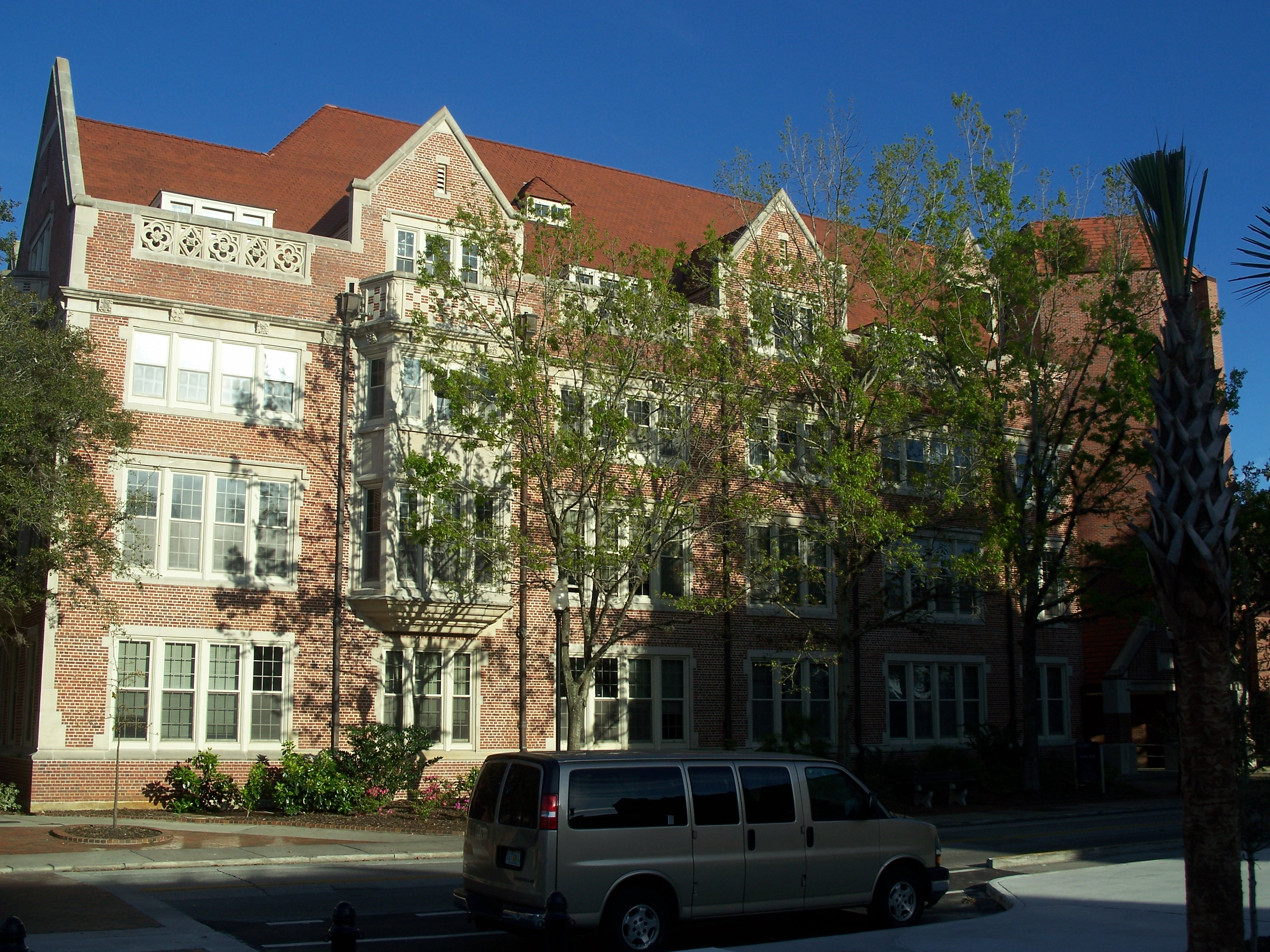

- Location within Florida Location within the United States
- Location: Gainesville, Florida
- Coordinates: 29°38′57″N 82°20′30″W
- Built: 1927
- Architect: designed by William Augustus Edwards of Edwards & Sayward; completed by Rudolph Weaver
- NRHP reference No.: 86002411
- Added to NRHP: September 11, 1986

Rolfs Hall (also known as the Horticulture Sciences Building) is an historic building on the campus of the University of Florida in Gainesville, Florida, United States. It is located in the northeastern section of the campus. It was designed in the Collegiate Gothic style by William Augustus Edwards and completed by Rudolph Weaver, who succeeded him as architect for the Florida Board of Control. On September 11, 1986, it was added to the U.S. National Register of Historic Places. Rolfs Hall is named for Peter Henry Rolfs, who was dean of the College of Agriculture from 1915 to 1920.

== See also ==
- University of Florida
- Buildings at the University of Florida
- Campus Historic District
