= University Auditorium (Gainesville, Florida) =

Coordinates: 29°38′56″N 82°20′34″W

- U.S. Historic district – Contributing property
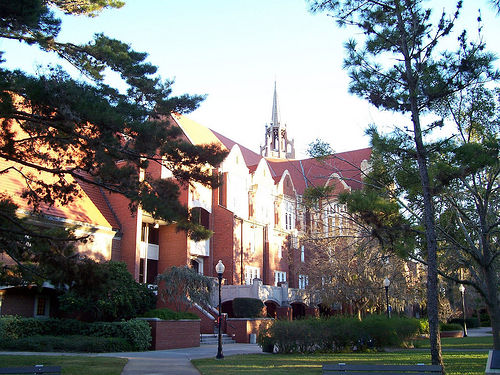
- University Auditorium

- Location within Florida Location within the United States
- Location: Gainesville, Florida
- Built: 1922-1924
- Architect: William Augustus Edwards
- Architectural style: Late Gothic Revival

The University Auditorium, occasionally known as the Memorial Auditorium and sometimes called the University of Florida Auditorium, is a historic building on the campus of the University of Florida in Gainesville, Florida, in the United States. It was designed by William Augustus Edwards in the Collegiate Gothic style and was built between 1922-1924. It was restored and expanded in 1977 by architect James McGinley. The expansion, which added new entrances, lobbies and stage dressing rooms along with air-conditioning, was designed to complement but not match the original architecture. It is a contributing property in the University of Florida Campus Historic District which was added to the National Register of Historic Places on April 20, 1989. On April 18, 2012, the AIA's Florida Chapter placed University Auditorium on its list of Florida Architecture: 100 Years. 100 Places.

== Interior Design ==
William Edward's University Chapel-Auditorium was planned in the early 1920s to be the first unit of an imposing administrative building with a massive central bell tower. This design was clearly patterned after London's 11th-century Westminster Hall and 19th-century Central Lobby in the Houses of Parliament, and also appropriates some features seen in Proctor Hall, the 1913 graduate dining hall at Princeton University designed by Ralph Adams Cram. By 1924 only the auditorium portion had been built; in the late 1940s the administrative plan became Tigert Hall sited on SW 13th Street, while in 1953 the bell tower plan became the adjacent Century Tower. The striking auditorium interior is architecturally unique within Edwards' practice in its application of a late 14th-century hammerbeam roof to a cruciform structure. Each of the carved hammerbeam end bosses presents one symbol of the "land-grant quadrivium" - six Scholars wear four-cornered academic caps ("mortar boards") reminiscent of 5th-century square birettas; five Musicians stroke Greek lyres; five Engineers lift notched gears; and six Athletes sport tight leather football helmets. In each of the two large windows above the east and west transept balconies, six scholars depicted in early 20th-century Art Deco style overlook the audience space.

== Andrew Anderson Memorial Organ ==
University President Albert Murphree received $50,000 for the organ from Dr. Andrew Anderson, a St. Augustine physician, philanthropist, and associate of early Florida developer Henry Flagler. The spacious interior of the University Auditorium with its elaborate wood-carvings and roomy galleries was reminiscent of Proctor Hall and other buildings at Princeton University (which Dr. Anderson had attended before the Civil War), and offered a congenial home. Tonal plans for Florida were prepared by William Zeuch of Boston's famous Skinner Organ Company, which built and installed the original instrument in early 1925. The organ was first played publicly on June 7, 1925, at the annual University Commencement Convocation. A musical landmark for its day, the organ was designed and voiced at the zenith of orchestral-imitative or "symphonic" organ design in this country, and is mentioned in such reference works as Orpha Ochse's The History of the Organ in the United States and Charles Callahan's The American Classic Organ. It was heard frequently through the 1930s in recitals by Claude Murphree, University Organist, as well as in early broadcasts over the University's "new" radio station, WRUF. An elaborate organ façade was also designed by the architect, but was never built.

In the early 1960s the Æolian-Skinner Organ Company of Boston began a program of mechanical renovation and tonal changes, and the M. P. Moller Organ Company continued expanding and modifying the organ as a teaching and recital instrument for the growing School of Music. Only a handful of Skinner stops remain in the present instrument, with the majority coming from Æolian-Skinner, Moller, Austin and Reuter. Today the Andrew Anderson Memorial Organ, with 99 ranks and nearly 5400 pipes, is one of the largest recital instruments in the United States, with a major place in the musical life of this community of scholars.

== Current use ==
The University of Florida Auditorium today is a performing arts venue which seats up to 843 people. It has a concert stage, and is used for musical concerts, lectures, convocations, and pageants. Its director is Brian Jose.

== See also ==
- University of Florida
- Buildings at the University of Florida
- Campus Historic District
