= Norman Hall (Gainesville, Florida) =

- Old P. K. Yonge Laboratory School
- U.S. National Register of Historic Places
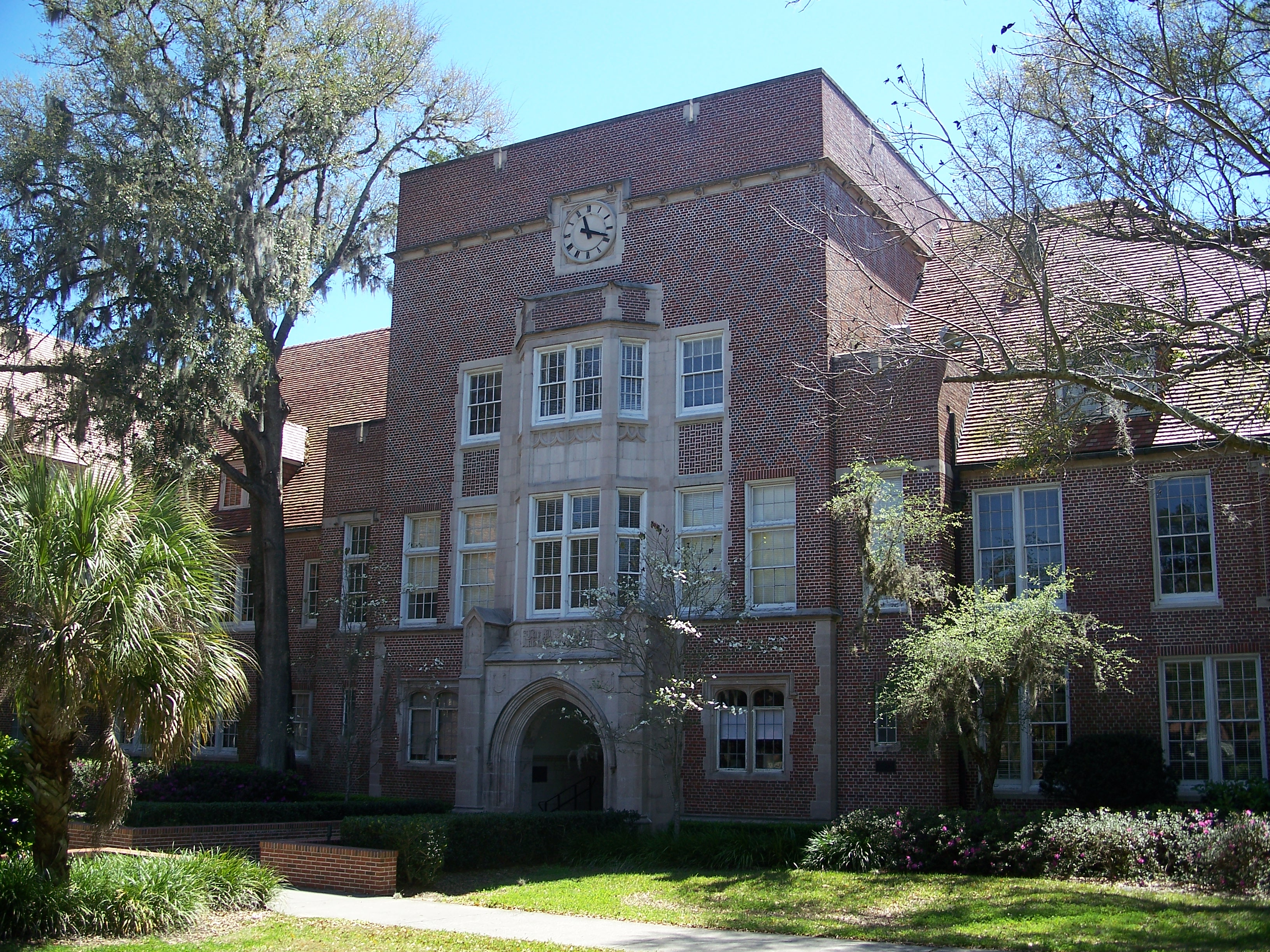

- Location within Florida
- Location: Gainesville, Florida
- Coordinates: 29°38′48″N 82°20′17″W
- Built: 1932
- Architect: Rudolph Weaver; builder: Paul Smith Construction Co.
- NRHP reference No.: 89002302
- Added to NRHP: January 26, 1990

Norman Hall (originally known as P. K. Yonge Laboratory School) is a historic academic building on the eastern campus of the University of Florida in Gainesville, Florida. It was designed by architect Rudolph Weaver in the Collegiate Gothic style, and built in 1932. It originally housed the university's research and development primary and secondary schools, but now is the principal building of the university's College of Education. It is located on U.S. 441, near the southwest corner of S.W. 3rd Avenue and S.W. 12th Street in Gainesville. On January 26, 1990, it was added to the U.S. National Register of Historic Places.

== Images ==
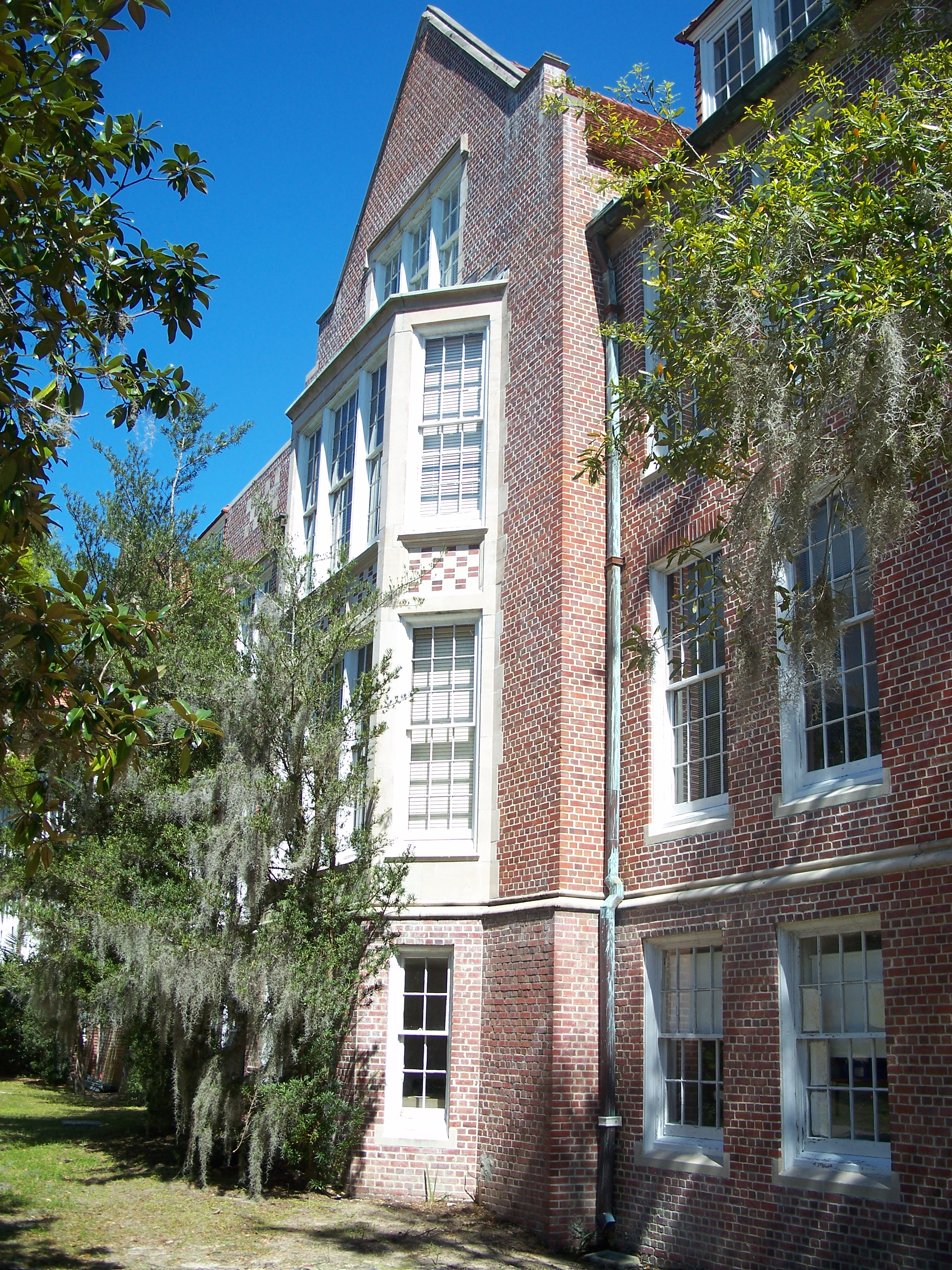

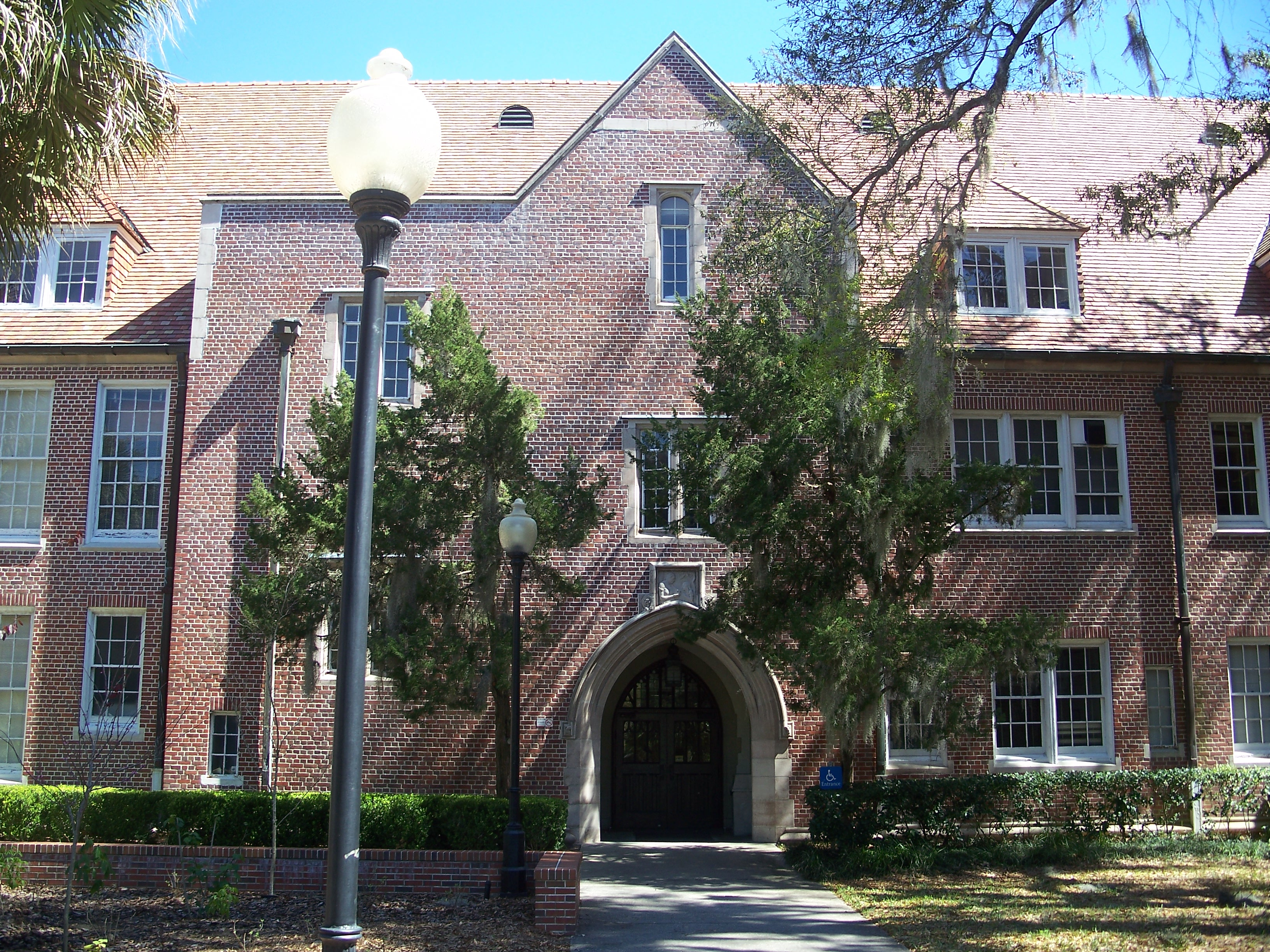

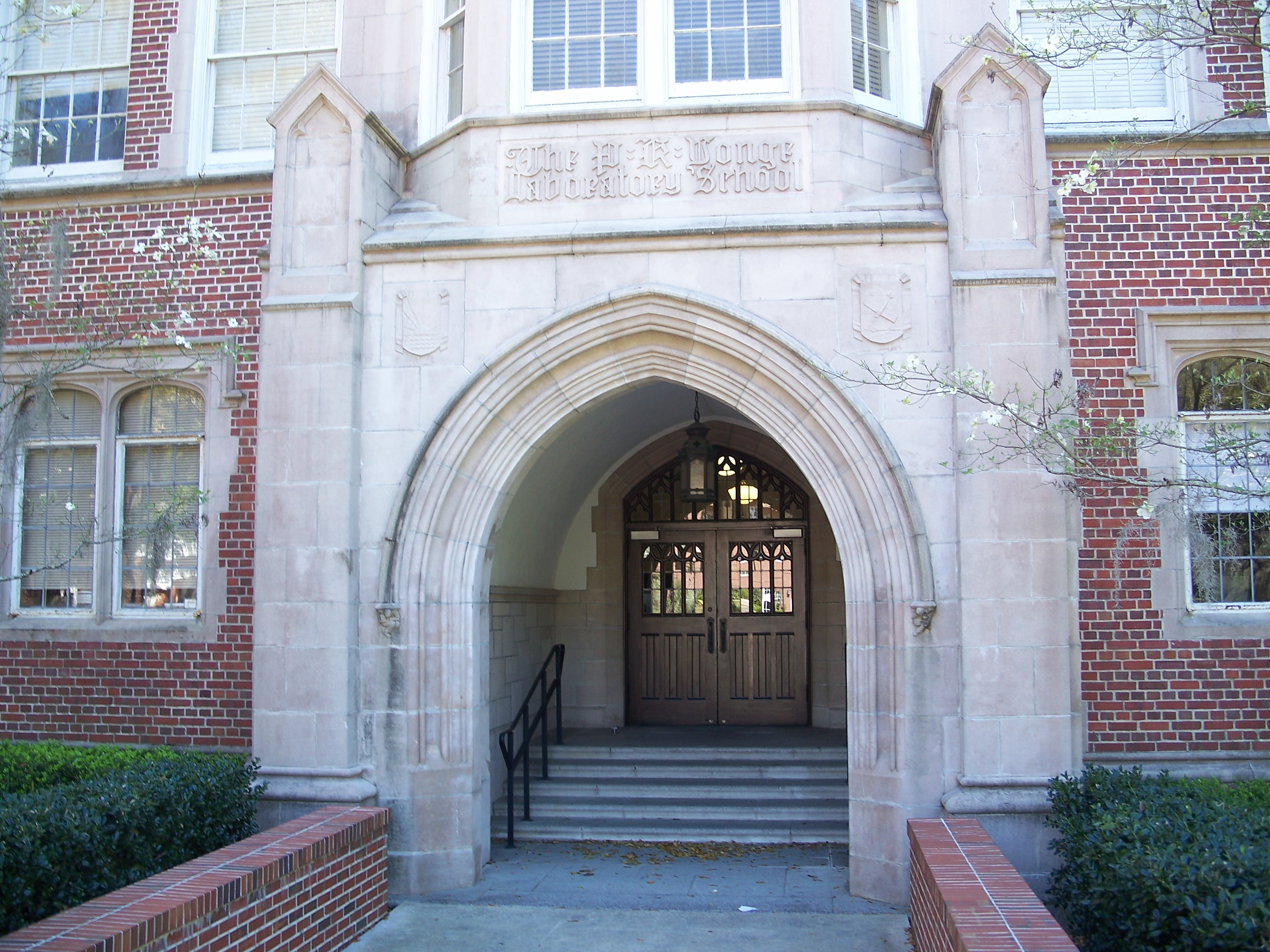

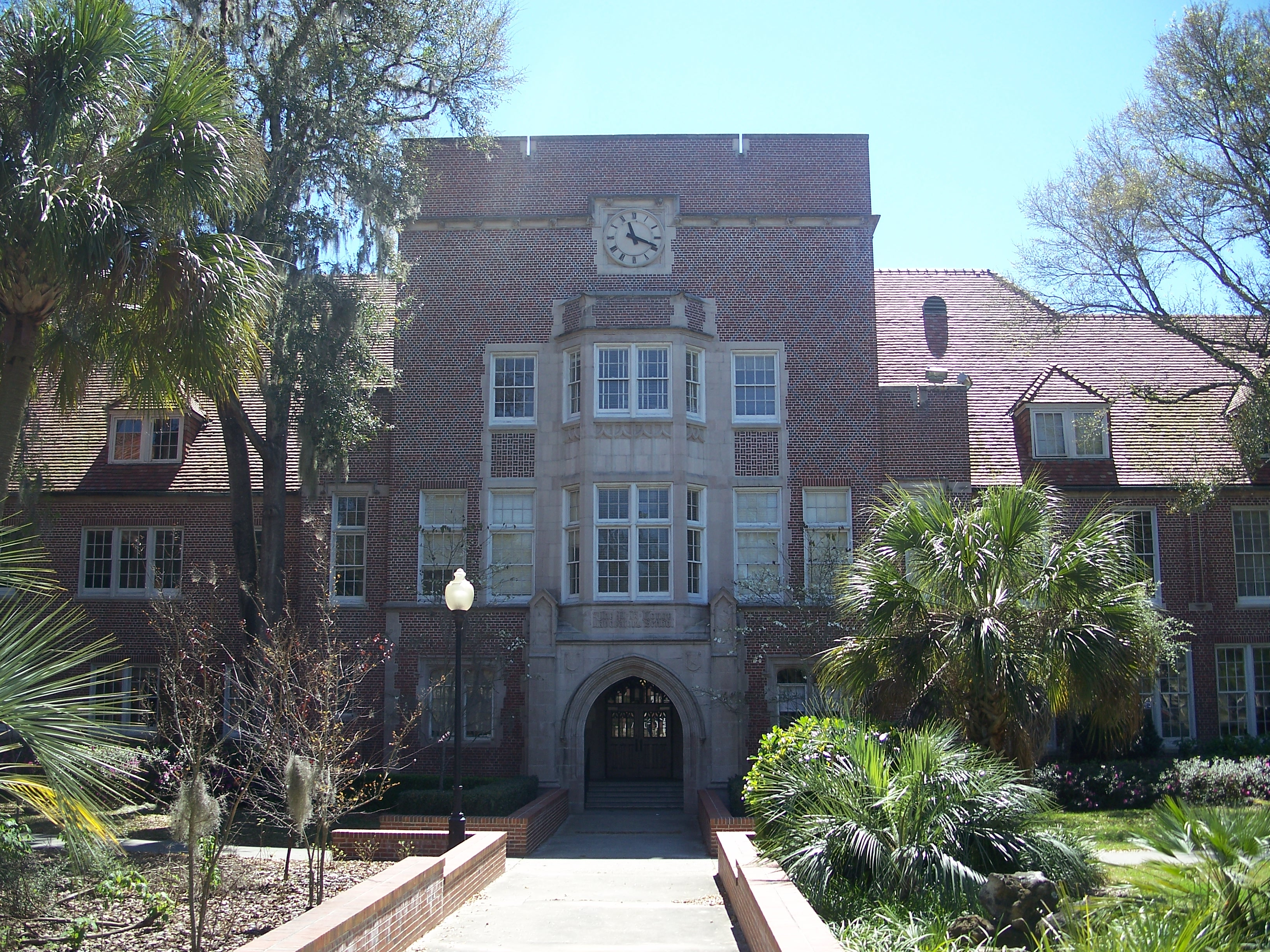

== Namesake ==
Norman Hall is named for James W. Norman, former dean of the College of Education. The P.K. Yonge Laboratory School was named for P.K. Yonge, a prominent businessman who was a member of the Florida Board of Control during the formative years of the University of Florida and the state university system.

== See also ==
- Buildings at the University of Florida
- History of the University of Florida
- University of Florida College of Education
