= Walker Hall (Gainesville, Florida) =

Coordinates: 29.6494194°N 82.3415862°W

- U.S. Historic district – Contributing property
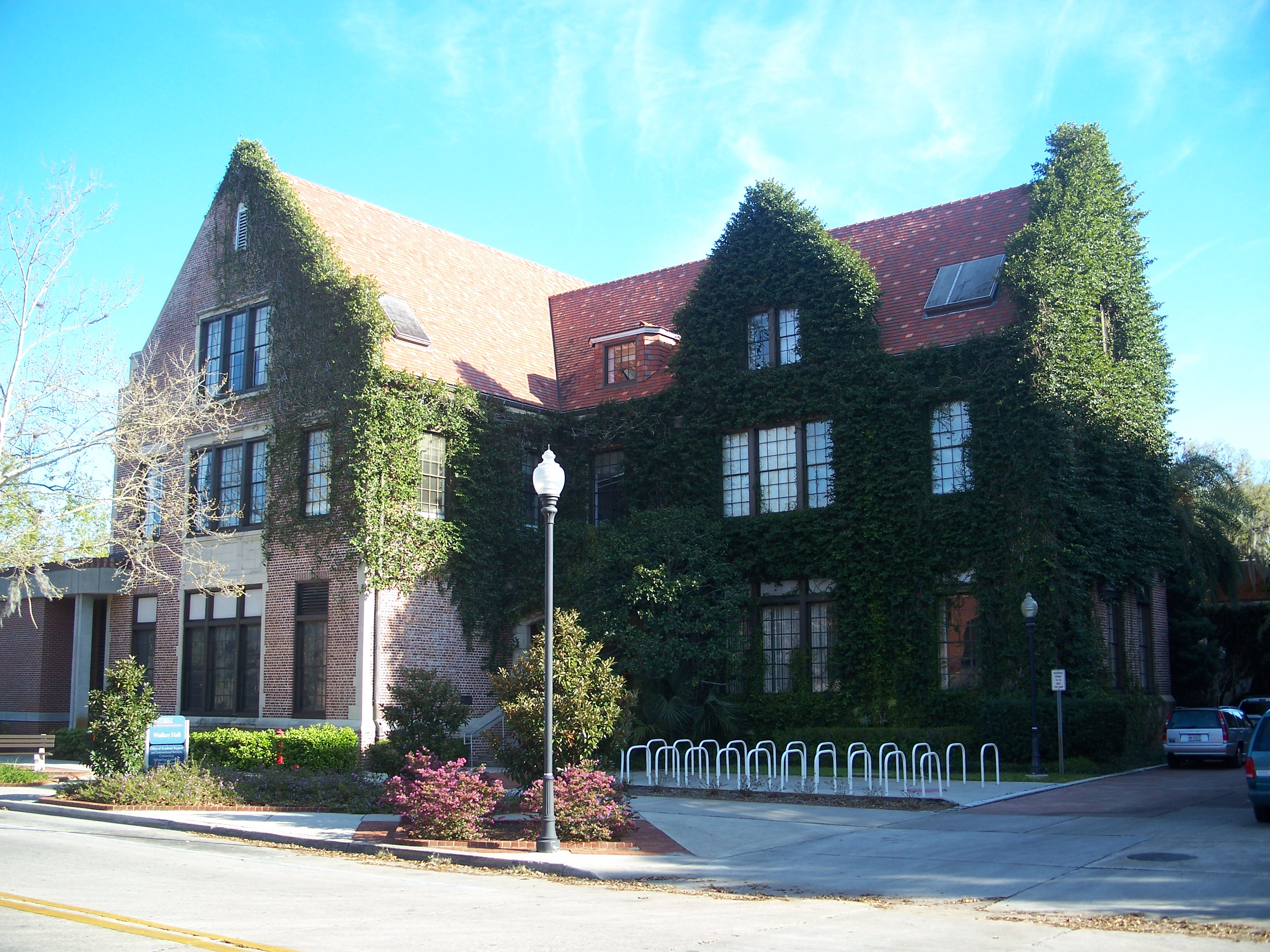

- Location within Florida Location within the United States
- Location: Gainesville, Florida
- Built: 1927
- Architect: Rudolph Weaver
- Architectural style: Late Gothic Revival

Walker Hall, originally known as the Mechanical Engineering Building, is an historic classroom building on the campus of the University of Florida in Gainesville, Florida, in the United States. It was designed by Rudolph Weaver in the Collegiate Gothic style and was built in 1927 It was later named for Col. Edgar S. Walker, a civil engineering professor.

Walker Hall is a contributing property in the University of Florida Campus Historic District which was added to the National Register of Historic Places on April 20, 1989.

== See also ==
- University of Florida
- Buildings at the University of Florida
- Campus Historic District
