= Flint Hall (Gainesville, Florida) =

- U.S. National Register of Historic Places
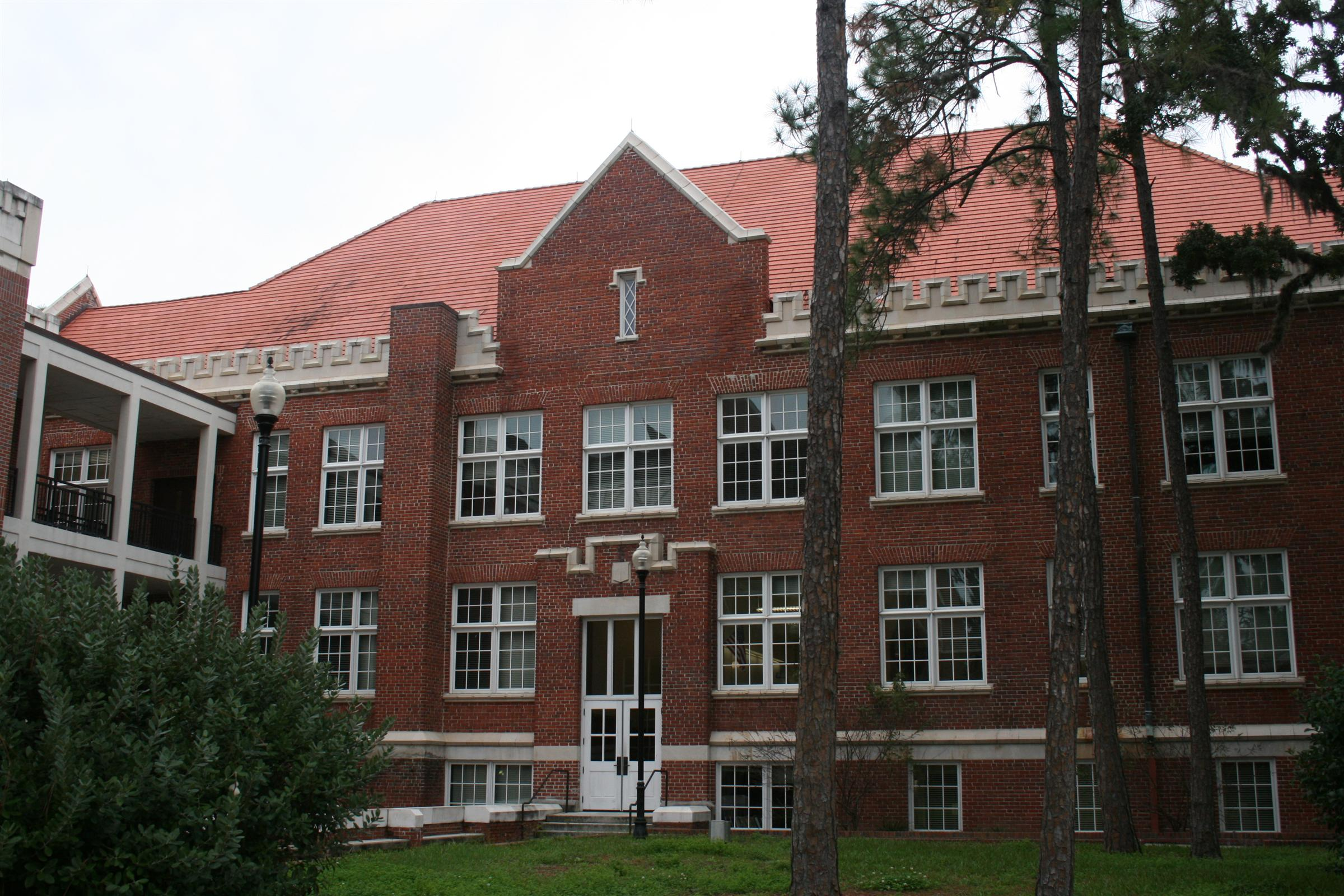

- Location within Florida Location within the United States
- Location: Gainesville, Florida
- Coordinates: 29°39′6″N 82°20′37″W
- Architect: William A. Edwards
- NRHP reference No.: 79000654
- Added to NRHP: June 27, 1979

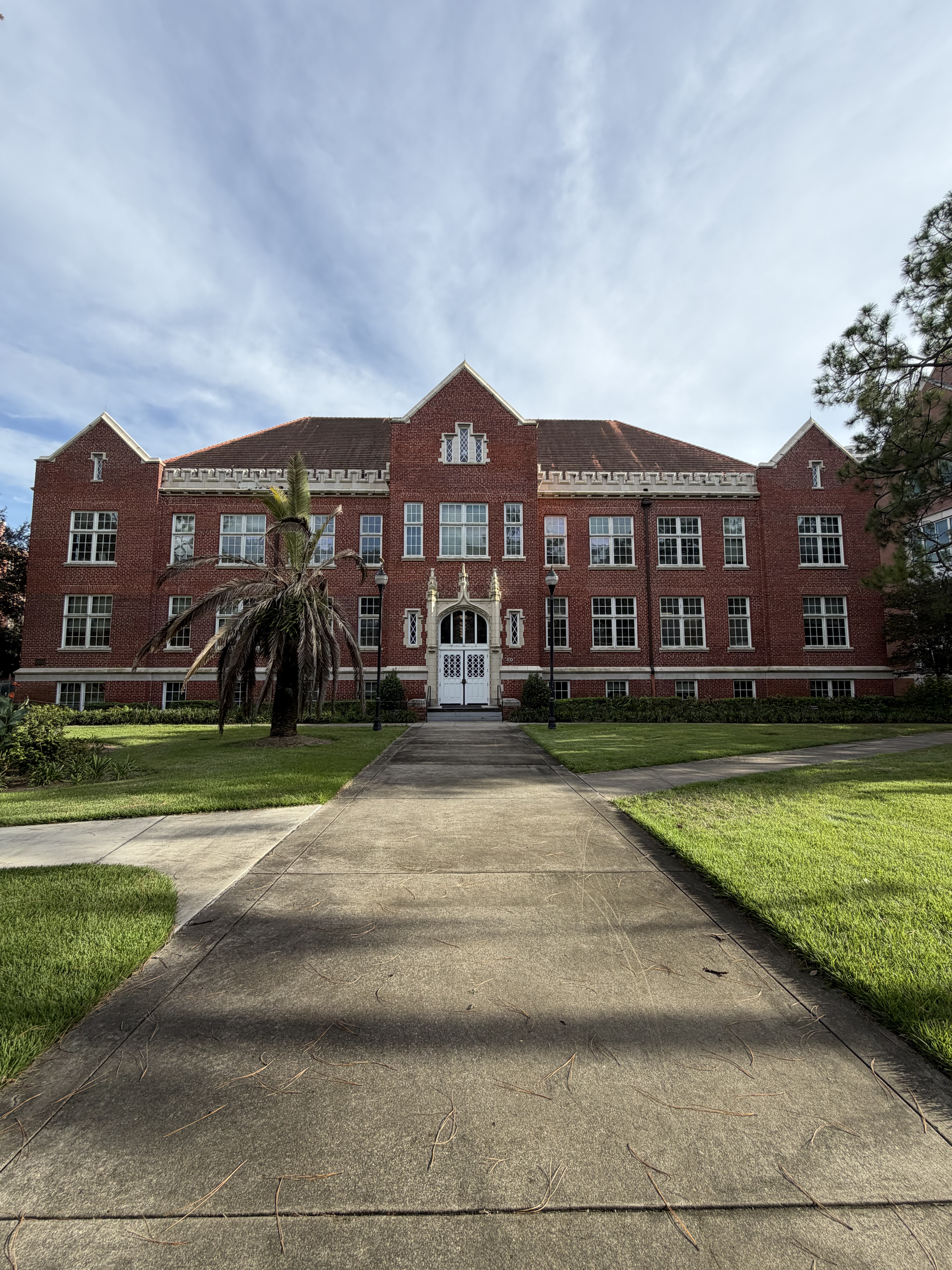
The north entrance of Keene-Flint Hall in August 2026

Keene-Flint Hall (formerly known as Science Hall and Flint Hall) is a historic site in Gainesville, Florida, United States. It is located in the northeastern section of the University of Florida. On June 27, 1979, it was added to the U.S. National Register of Historic Places. Keene-Flint Hall houses the University of Florida's History Department.

== Namesake ==
Keene-Flint Hall is named for Dr. Edward R. Flint, the University of Florida's professor of chemistry from 1905 to 1919, and Kenneth Keene.

== See also ==
- University of Florida
- Buildings at the University of Florida
- Campus Historic District
