= Peabody Hall (Gainesville, Florida) =

- U.S. National Register of Historic Places
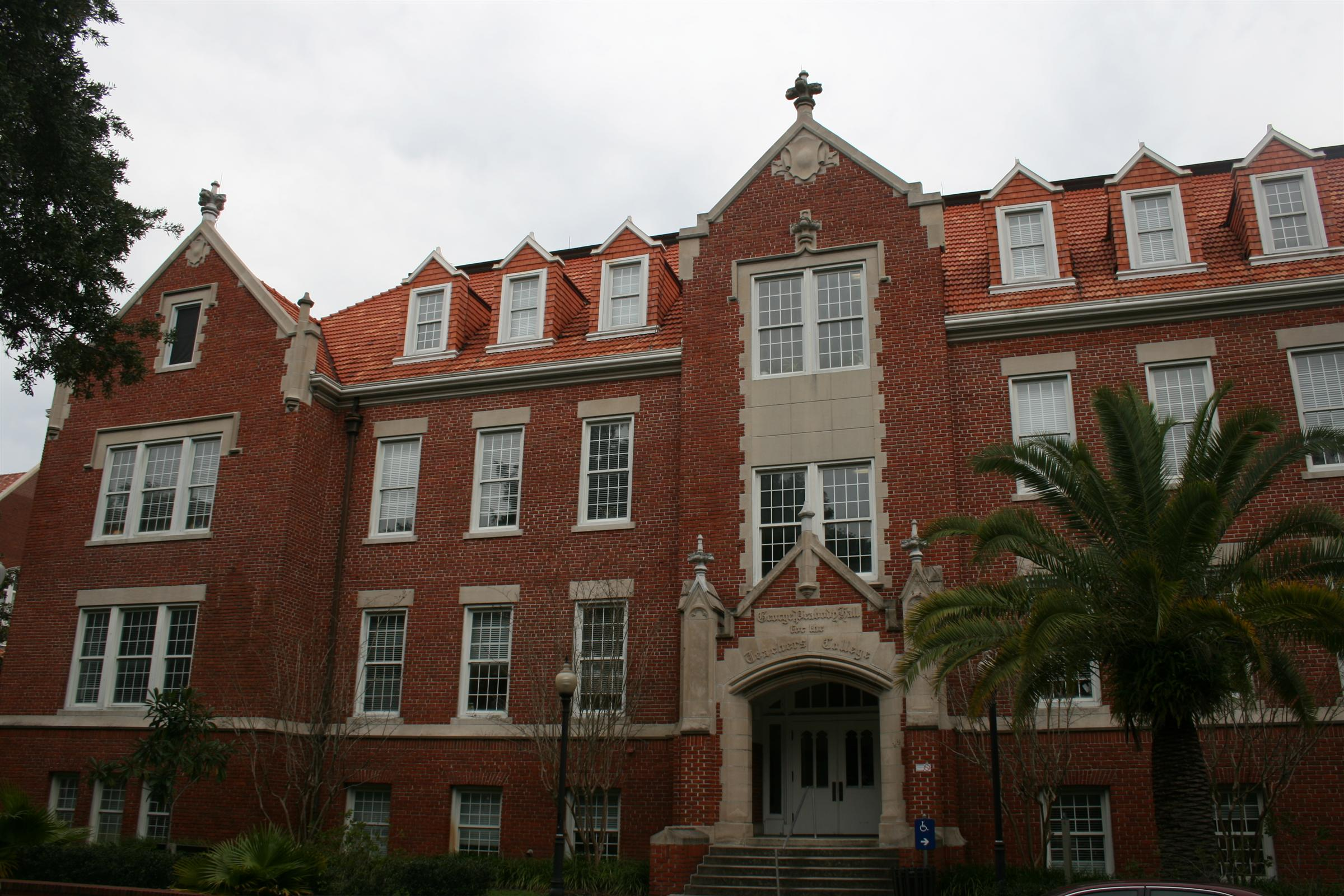

- Location within Florida Location within the United States
- Location: Gainesville, Florida
- Coordinates: 29°38′59″N 82°20′31″W
- Built: 1913
- Architect: William A. Edwards
- NRHP reference No.: 79000658
- Added to NRHP: June 27, 1979

Peabody Hall is a historic site in Gainesville, Florida, United States. It is located in the northeastern section of the University of Florida. On June 27, 1979, it was added to the U.S. National Register of Historic Places. It currently houses the Dean of Students Office, the Counseling Center at the university, and the Center of New Student and Family Programs.

== Namesake ==
Peabody Hall is named after George Peabody, an influential investment banker and known to some as the founder of modern philanthropy.

== See also ==
- University of Florida
- Buildings at the University of Florida
- Campus Historic District
