= Century Tower (University of Florida) =

Bell tower in Florida, United States

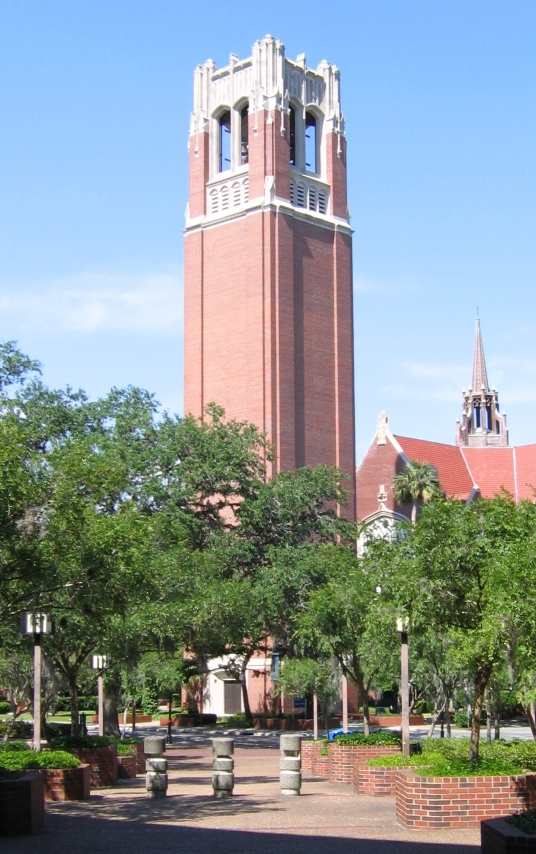
- Century Tower at the University of Florida
- Interactive map of the Century Tower area

General information
- Type: Tower
- Architectural style: Memorial
- Location: Main campus, University of Florida, Gainesville, Florida, United States
- Coordinates: 29.648834°N 82.34329°W
- Completed: 1953

Design and construction
- Architect: William Augustus Edwards
- Main contractor: Auchter Company

Website
- UF Carillon home page

- Century Tower
- U.S. Historic district – Contributing property
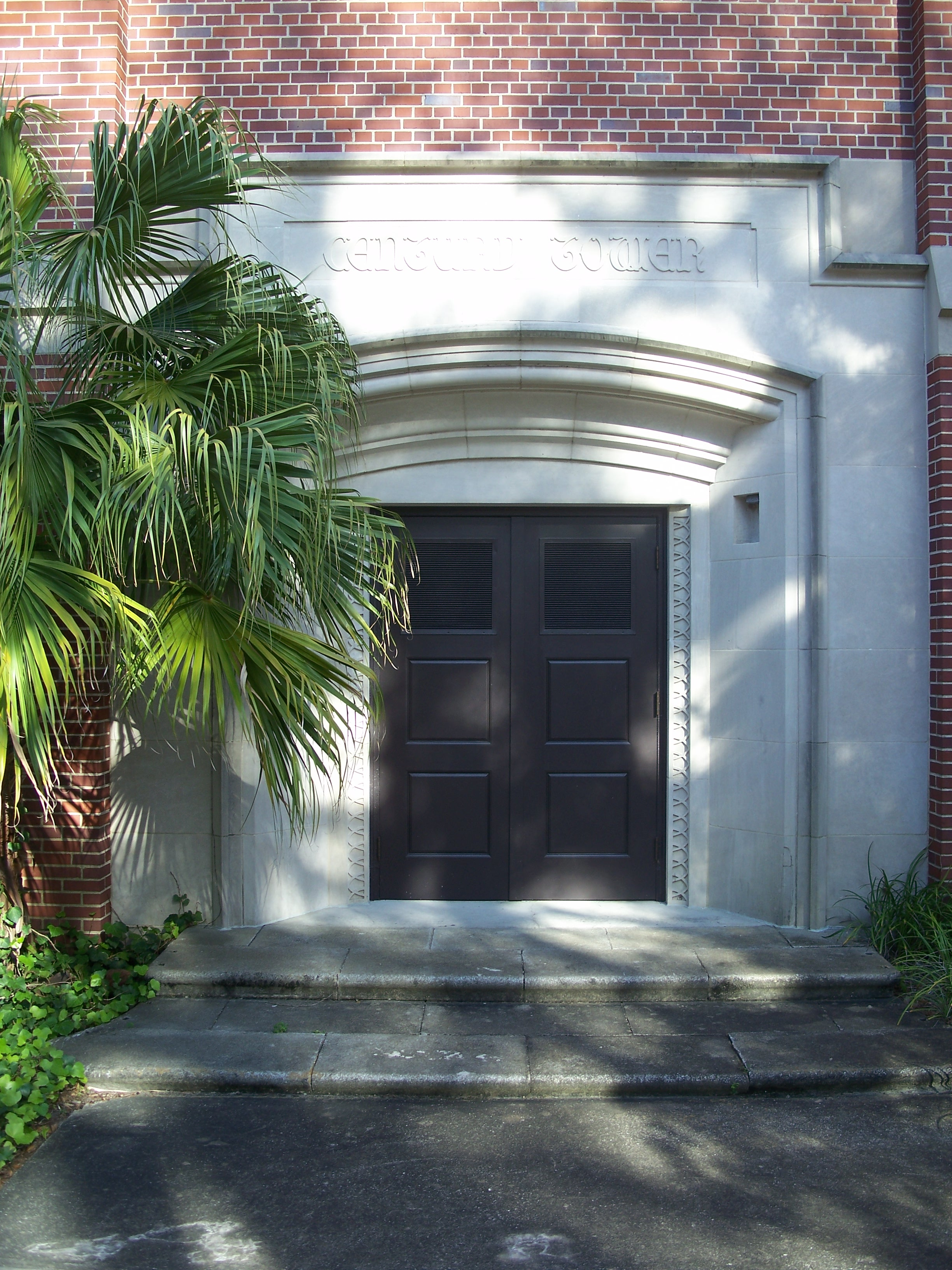
- Entrance to Century Tower

- Location within Florida Location within the United States
- Location: Gainesville, Florida
- Built: 1953
- Architect: Jefferson M. Hamilton
- Architectural style: Modified Collegiate Gothic

The Century Tower is a 157-foot-tall (48 m) bell tower containing a carillon in the center of the University of Florida campus in Gainesville, Florida, United States.

== History ==
Begun in 1953 by the Auchter Company to commemorate the 100th anniversary of the founding of UF's parent institution, the East Florida Seminary in Ocala, it also serves as a memorial for students and alumni who perished in both World War I and World War II. This fulfilled the original campus design of the university's first architect, William Augustus Edwards, which called for a Gothic bell tower as a focal point for the entire campus. The design carries forward the spirit and proportions of Canterbury Cathedral's central Bell Harry Tower, a Norman structure rebuilt in the 14th century to a design by John Wastell (best known as the architect of King's College Chapel in Cambridge). However, at the time of the Century Tower's completion in 1956 there was no money to buy bells for a carillon. An electronic bell system given by J.E. Davis and A.D. Davis, two of the Davis Brothers who controlled Winn-Dixie, was used until it finally broke down in 1975. In 1976, $200,000 from accumulated student fees was used to buy the initial set of 49 bells. A Dutch bellfoundry, Royal Eijsbouts bell foundry designed, fabricated and installed the full carillon. In May 1979 the carillon was dedicated in two recitals by Milford Myhre, carillonneur of the Bok Singing Tower, Lake Wales FL, who had served as consultant for the instrument.

In 2002 a major gift from the estate of Larry Allen Webb of St. Augustine, Florida, (a distant relative of President Dwight D. Eisenhower) made possible the addition of twelve trebles for a total of 61 bells, with complete revision of the carillon playing action and provision of an identical studio practice clavier in the adjacent University Auditorium, including sound samples from ten major carillons throughout the world. Thus the Century Tower Carillon of sixty-one bells was completed in its present form at the 50th anniversary of the tower itself. It was dedicated on September 11, 2003, with a recital by University Carillonneur emeritus Willis Bodine.

In 2008 the Century Tower became a contributing property in the University of Florida Campus Historic District which was added to the National Register of Historic Places on April 20, 1989.

Perhaps because Century Tower was built soon after the university became co-ed, an old school joke states that every time a virgin graduates from UF, a brick falls off the tower.

== About the Century Tower Carillon ==
- It has 61 bells and a range span of 5 octaves.
- The entire carillon weighs 57,760 pounds (26,200 kg).
- The smallest bell in the Century Tower Carillon plays a high C, weighs 13 pounds (5.9 kg) and has a diameter of about 6 inches (150 mm).
- The largest bell, called the bourdon, plays a low A-sharp. It is 5 feet (1.5 m) tall, weighs about 7,000 pounds (3,200 kg) and is 5 feet 9 inches (1.75 m) in diameter.
- The carillon chimes each quarter of the hour from 8 a.m. to 8 p.m. The pentatonic clock strike melody that is played, "Florida Chimes", is unique to this carillon and was written by Dr. Budd Udell, former Chair of the Department of Music (1977–85) at the University of Florida.
- Students at the university can take carillon lessons, and regularly climb 194 steps in Century Tower to play in one of the two daily performances.
- The carillon is played using 61 keys (or “batons”) for the hands and 25 pedals for the feet. The musician sits in a small room just below the bell chamber.
- There are fewer than 200 carillons in North America and only four in Florida.

== See also ==
- Buildings at the University of Florida
- List of carillons in the United States
