= Old WRUF Radio Station =

- Formerly listed on the U.S. National Register of Historic Places
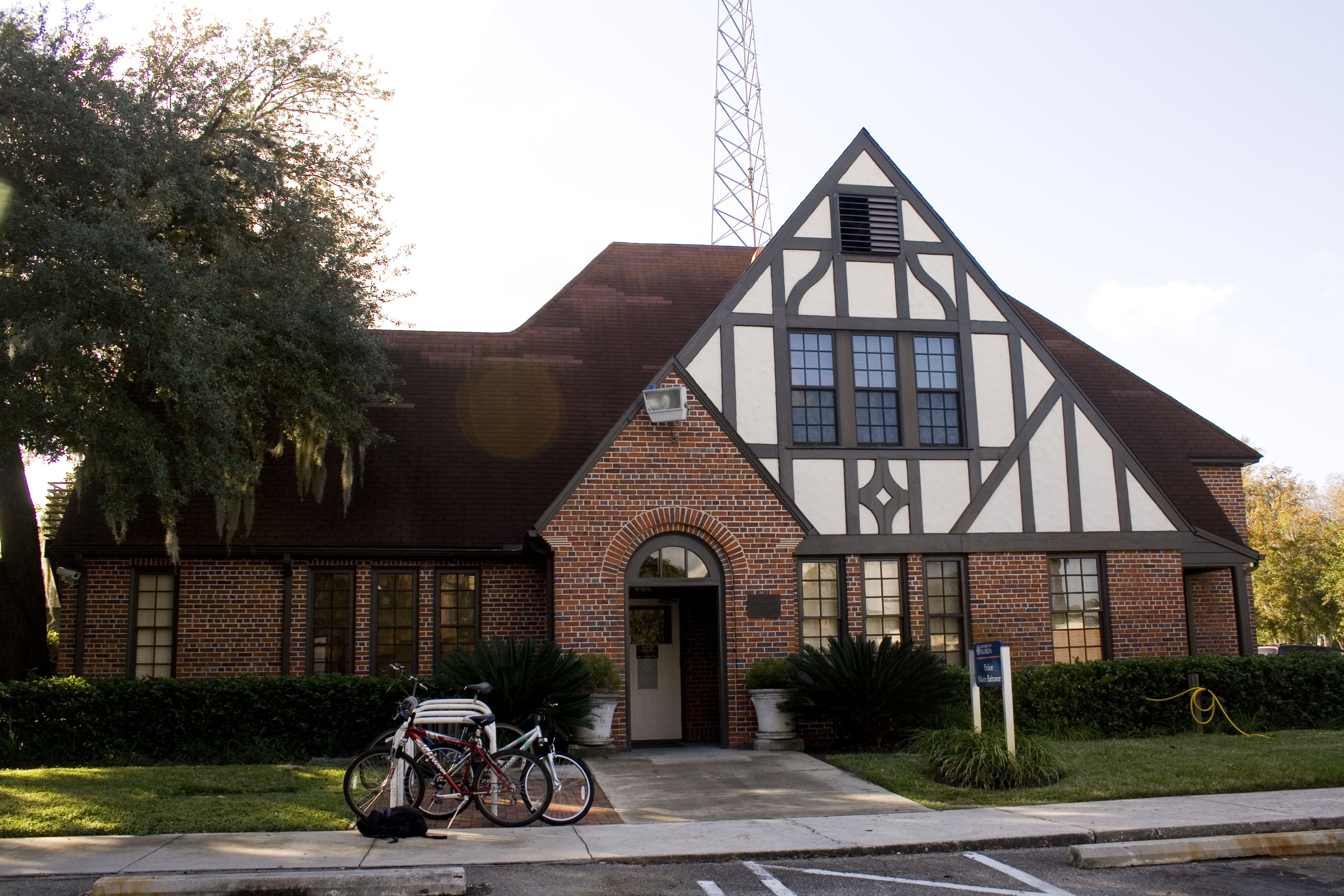
- University of Florida Police Department Headquarters, formerly the WRUF Radio Station

- Location within Florida Location within the United States
- Location: Gainesville, Florida United States
- Coordinates: 29°39′12″N 82°20′36″W
- Built: 1928
- Architectural style: Tudor Revival
- NRHP reference No.: 89001479

Significant dates
- Added to NRHP: September 21, 1989
- Removed from NRHP: April 18, 2025

The Old WRUF Radio Station (later the University of Florida Police Department headquarters) was a historic site in Gainesville, Florida, United States. It was located on the University of Florida campus (on the southeast corner of Museum Road and Newell Drive). On September 21, 1989, it was added to the U.S. National Register of Historic Places. It was delisted in 2025 following its demolition.

The building was demolished in 2021 to make way for a larger, more modern UF Public Safety Building. In lieu of demolition, an option to move the Old WRUF Radio Station a few hundred feet away was considered, but the cost to perform the move was estimated to be about $300,000. Construction on the UF Public Safety Building began in April 2021.

== See also ==
- Buildings at the University of Florida
- University of Florida
- WRUF (AM)
- WRUF-FM
