= Fannin County Courthouse =

Fannin County Courthouse may refer to:

- Fannin County Courthouse (Georgia)
- Fannin County Courthouse (Texas)
