= York County Courthouse =

- U.S. National Register of Historic Places
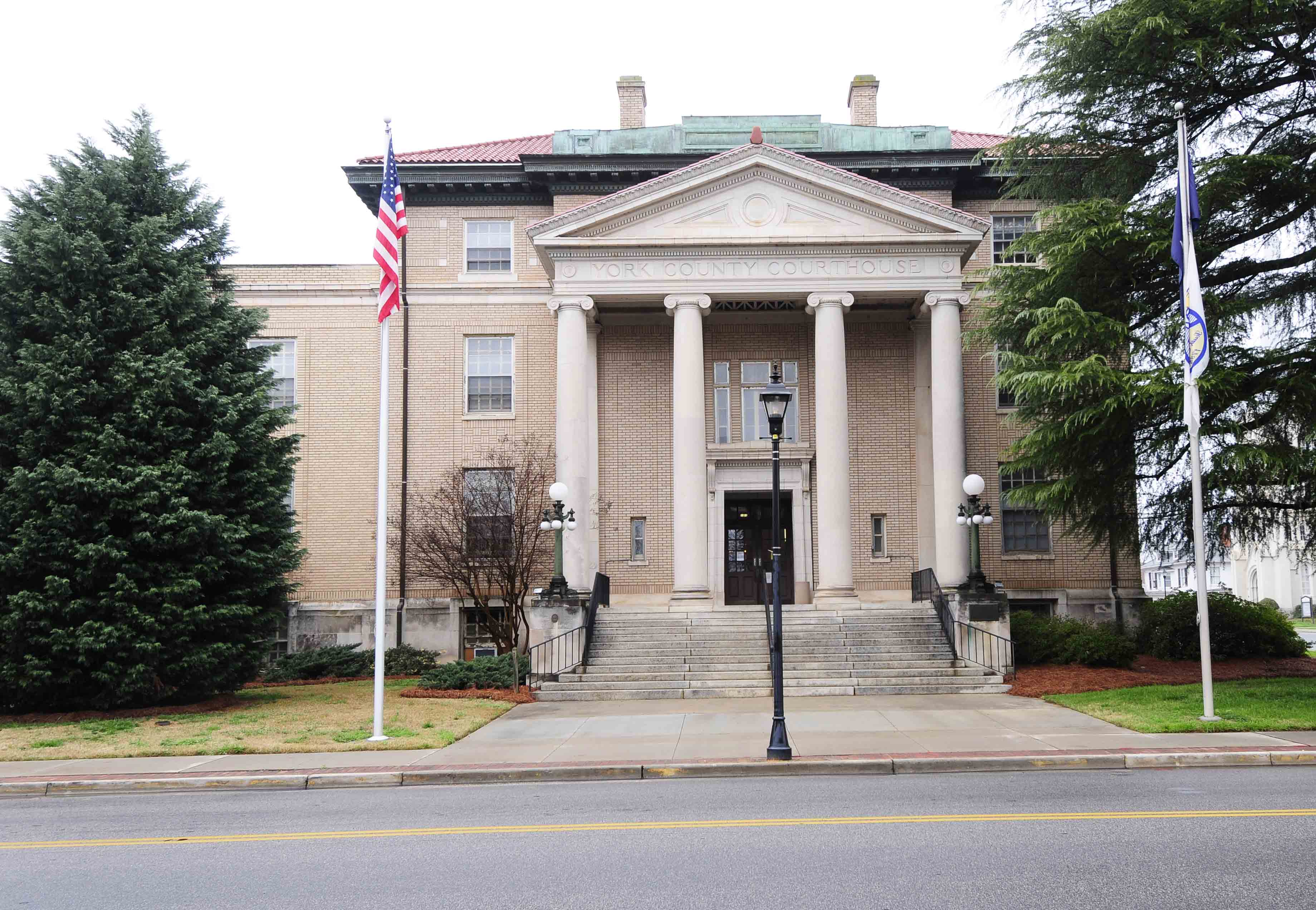

- Location within South Carolina Location within the United States
- Location: York, South Carolina
- Coordinates: 34°59′38″N 81°14′33″W
- Built: 1914
- Architect: William Augustus Edwards
- Architectural style: Classical Revival
- MPS: Courthouses in South Carolina Designed by William Augustus Edwards TR
- NRHP reference No.: 81000700
- Added to NRHP: October 30, 1981

The York County Courthouse, built in 1914, is an historic courthouse located at West Liberty and South Congress streets in the city of York in York County, South Carolina. It was designed in the Classical Revival style by Darlington native William Augustus Edwards who designed eight other South Carolina courthouses as well as academic buildings at 12 institutions in Florida, Georgia and South Carolina. On October 30, 1981, it was added to the National Register of Historic Places.

== See also ==
- List of Registered Historic Places in South Carolina
