= William Augustus Edwards =

American architect (1866–1939)

- Born: December 8, 1866; Darlington, South Carolina, US
- Died: March 30, 1939 (aged 72); Atlanta, Georgia, US
- Occupation: Architect
- Projects: University of Florida campus; Florida State University campus

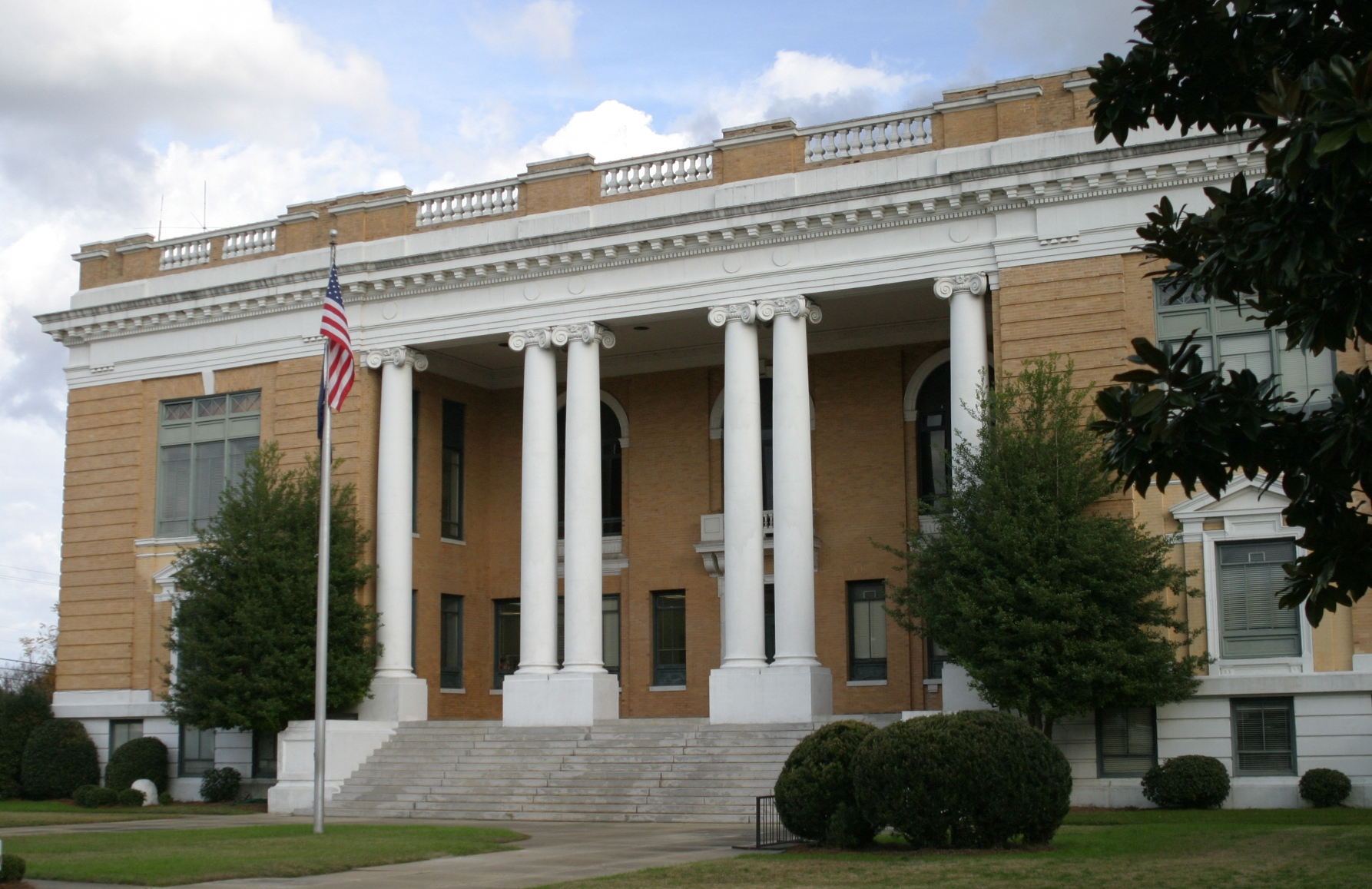
The Sumter County Courthouse in Sumter, South Carolina, designed by Edwards & Walter in the Neoclassical style and completed in 1907

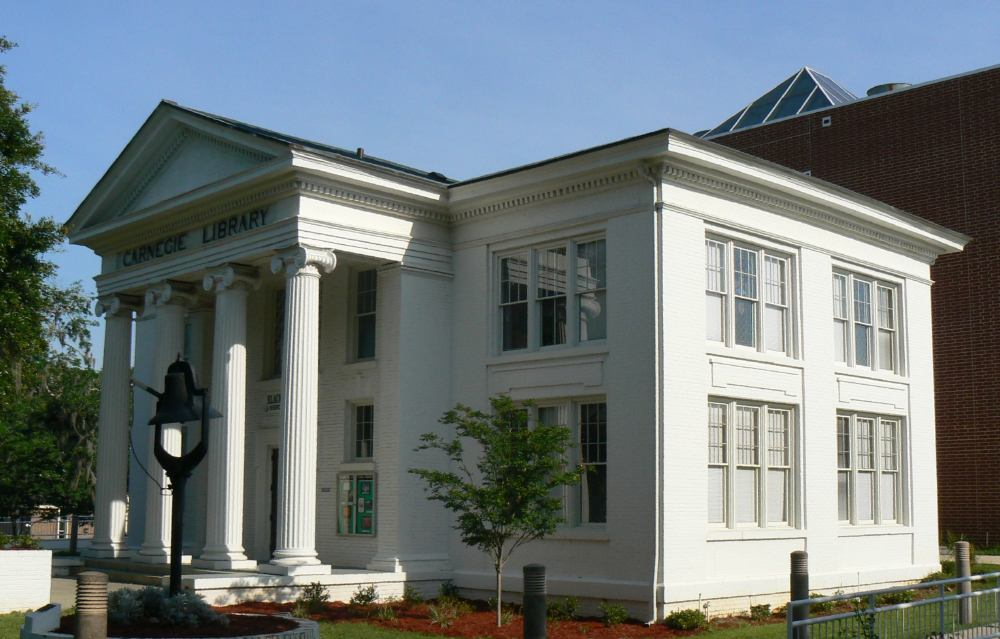
The former Carnegie Library of Florida A&M University, designed by Edwards & Walter in the Neoclassical style and completed in 1908

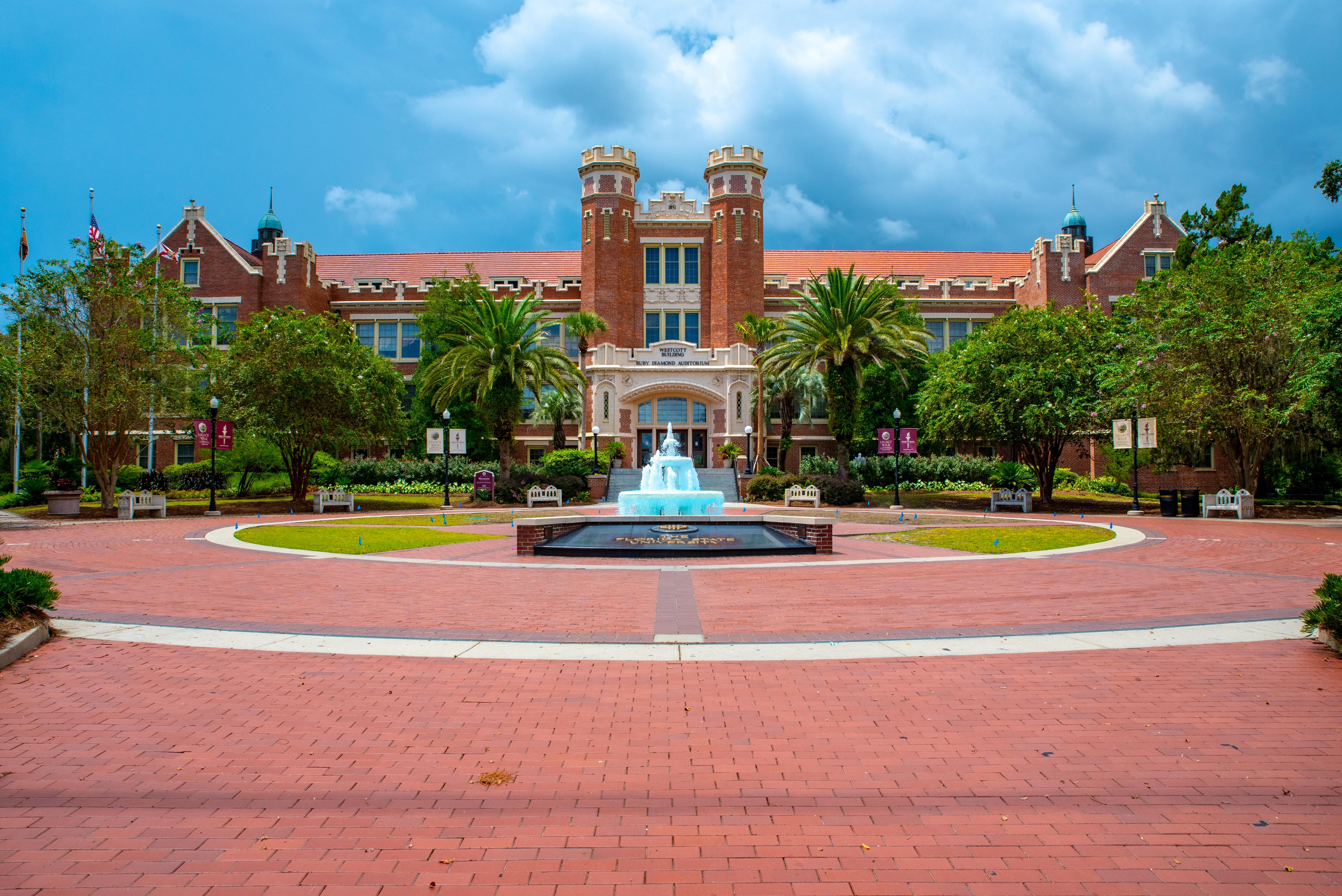
The Westcott Building of Florida State University, designed by Edwards & Walter in the Collegiate Gothic style and completed in 1910.

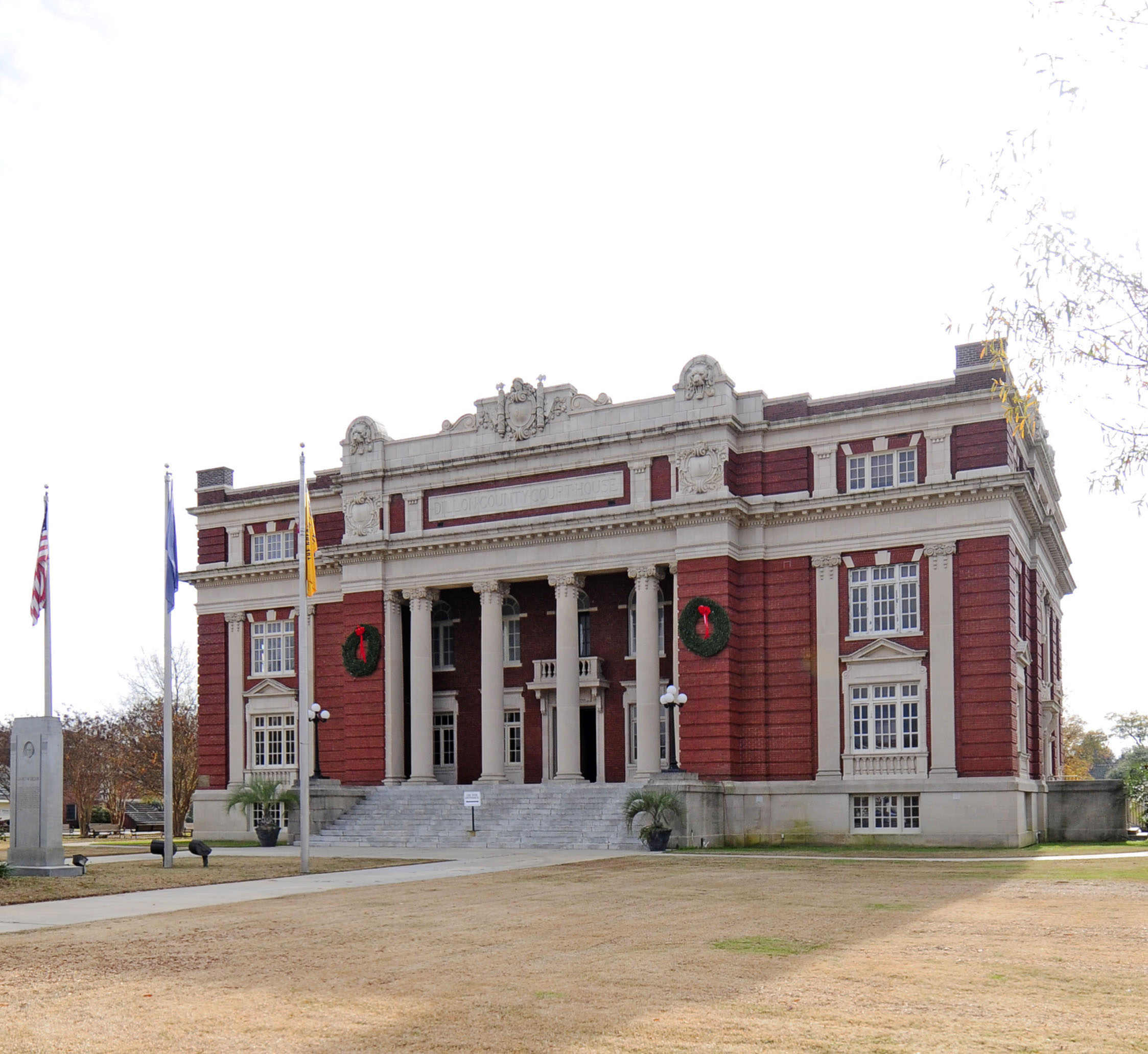
The Dillon County Courthouse in Dillon, South Carolina, designed by Edwards in the Neoclassical style and completed in 1911

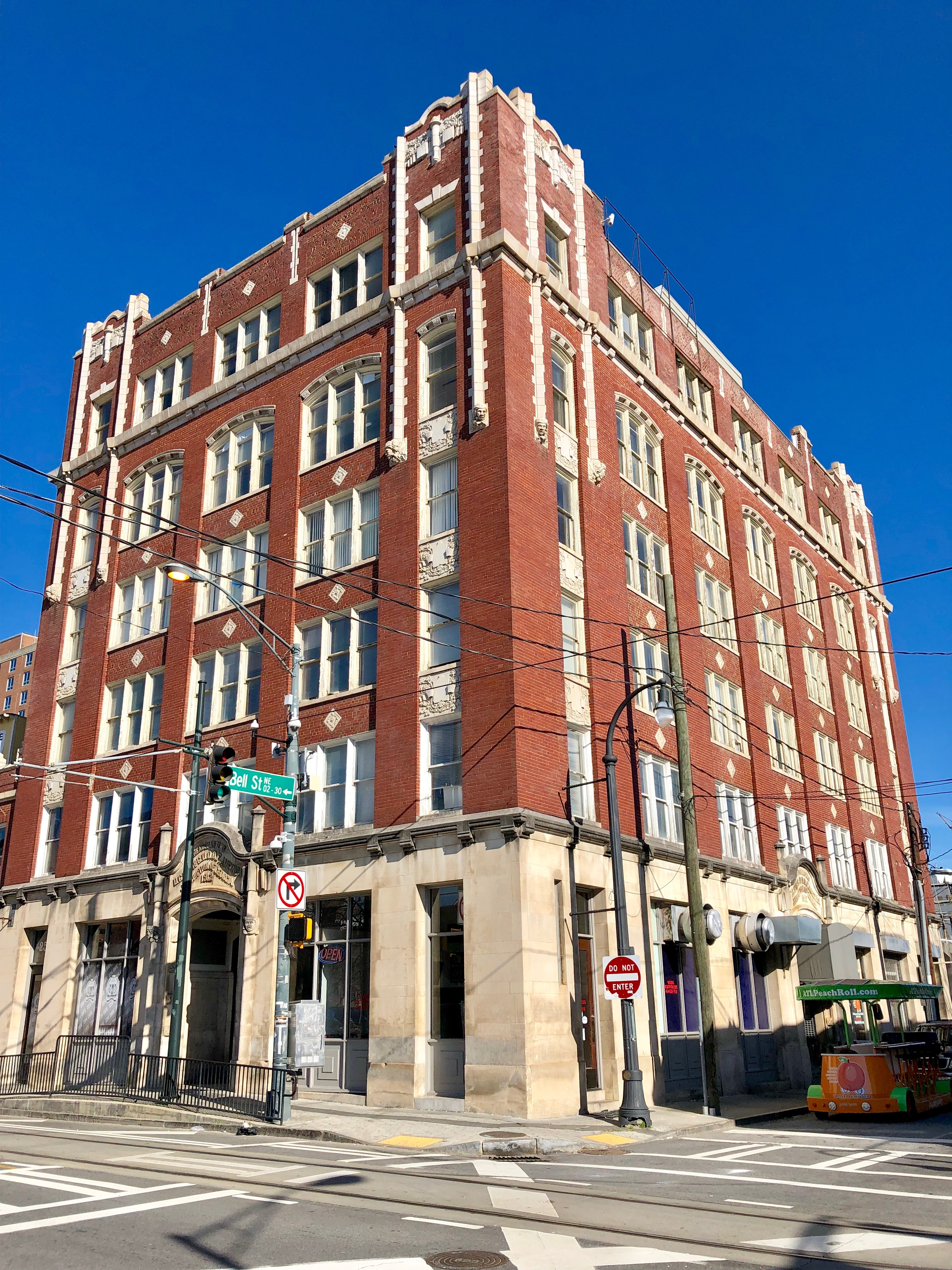
The Odd Fellows Building and Auditorium in Atlanta, designed by Edwards in the Gothic Revival style and completed in 1912

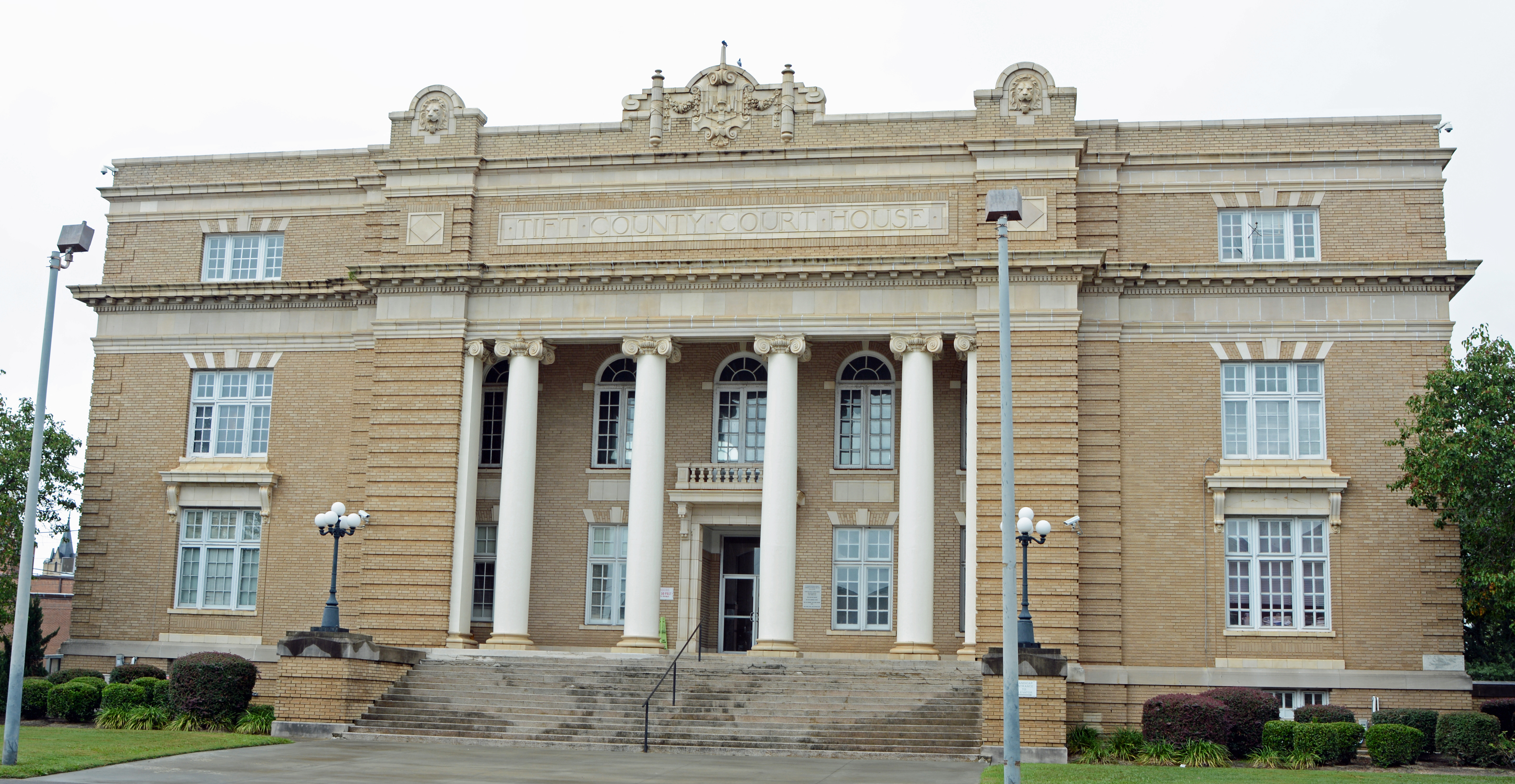
The Tift County Courthouse in Tifton, Georgia, designed by Edwards in the Neoclassical style and completed in 1913

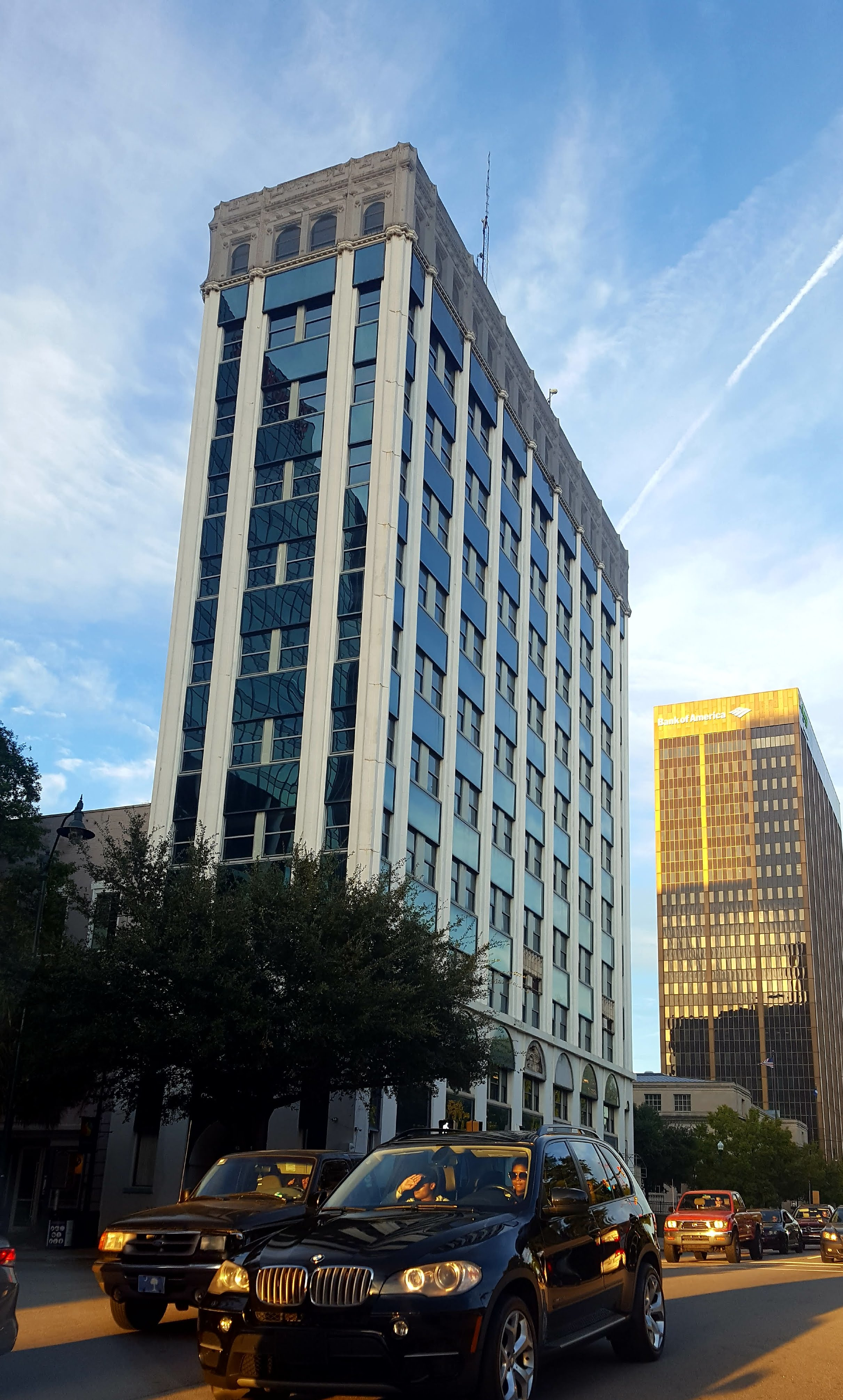
The Union National Bank Building in Columbia, South Carolina, designed by Edwards in the Gothic Revival style and completed in 1913

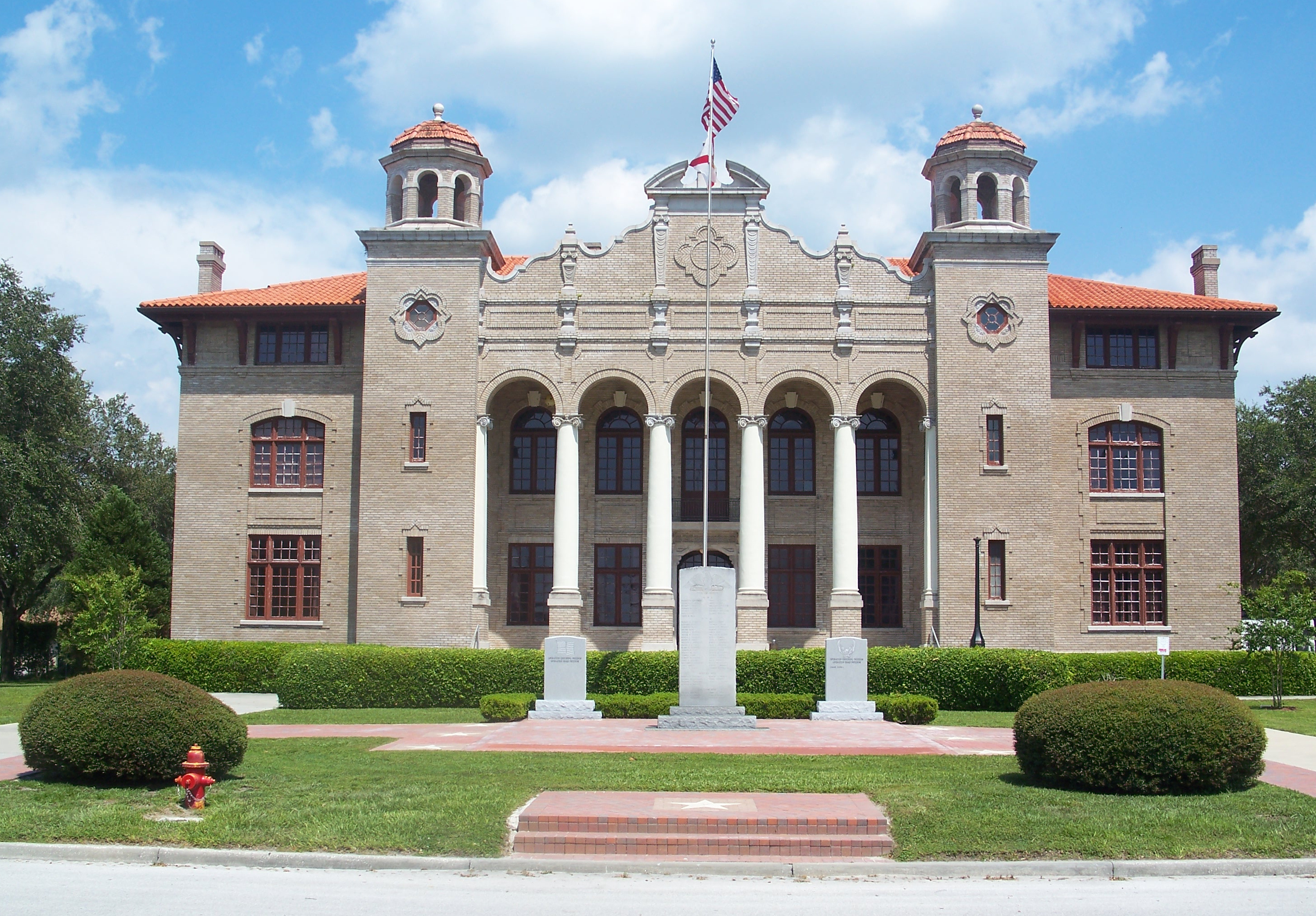
The Sumter County Courthouse in Bushnell, Florida, designed by Edwards in the Mediterranean Revival style and completed in 1914

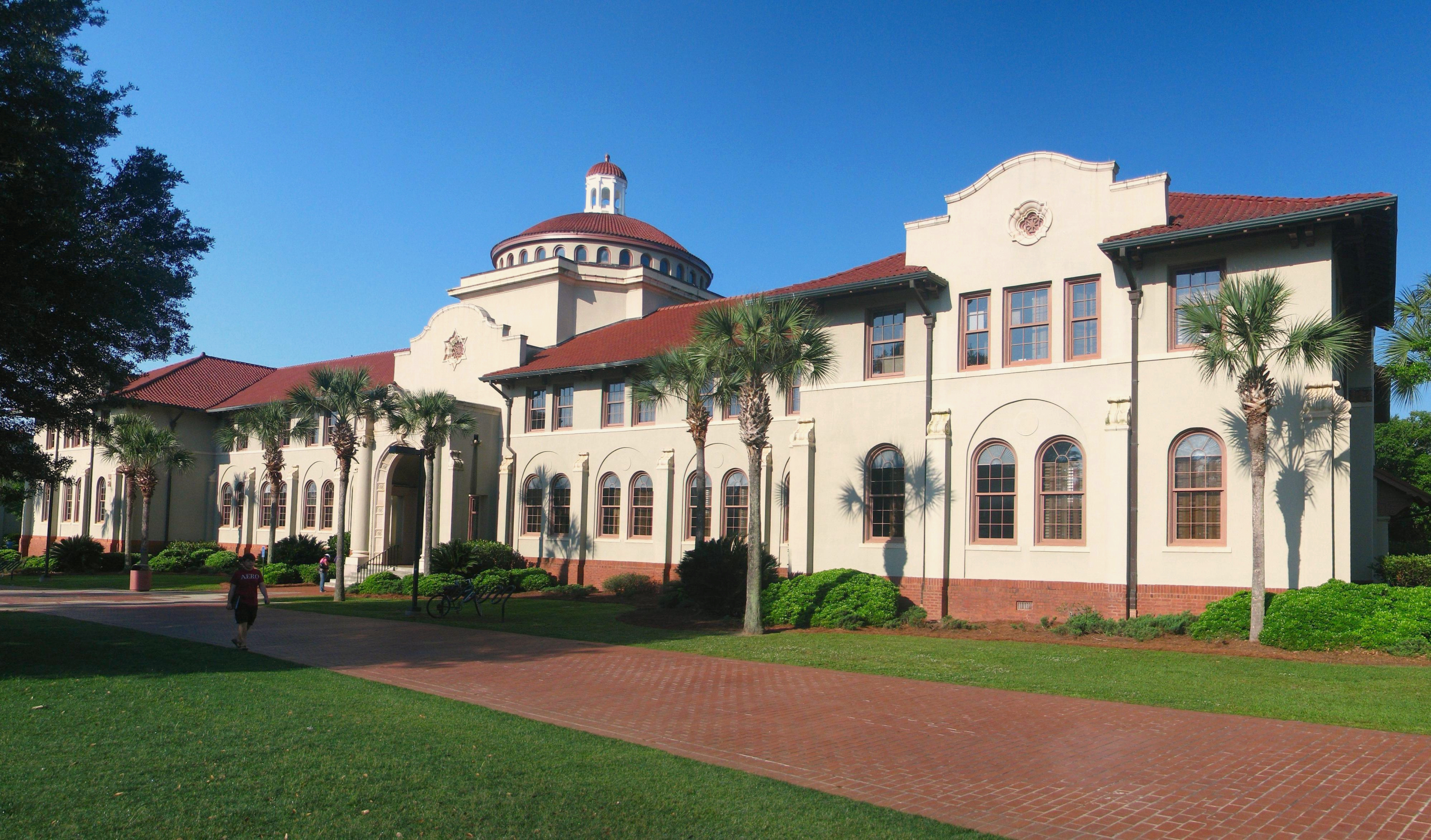
West Hall of Valdosta State University, designed by Edwards & Sayward in the Mission Revival style and completed in 1917

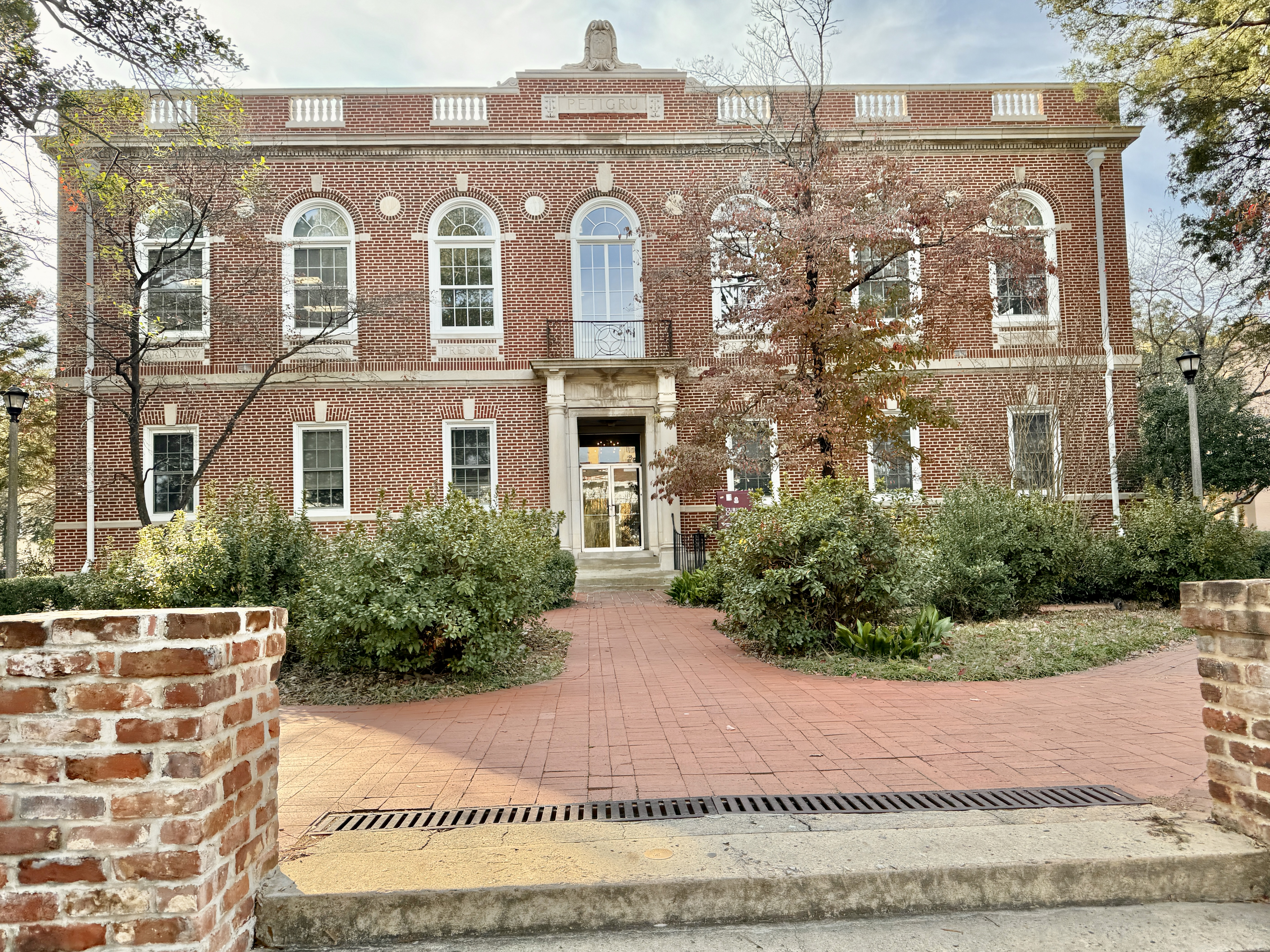
Currell College of the University of South Carolina, designed by Edwards & Sayward in the Colonial Revival style and completed in 1919

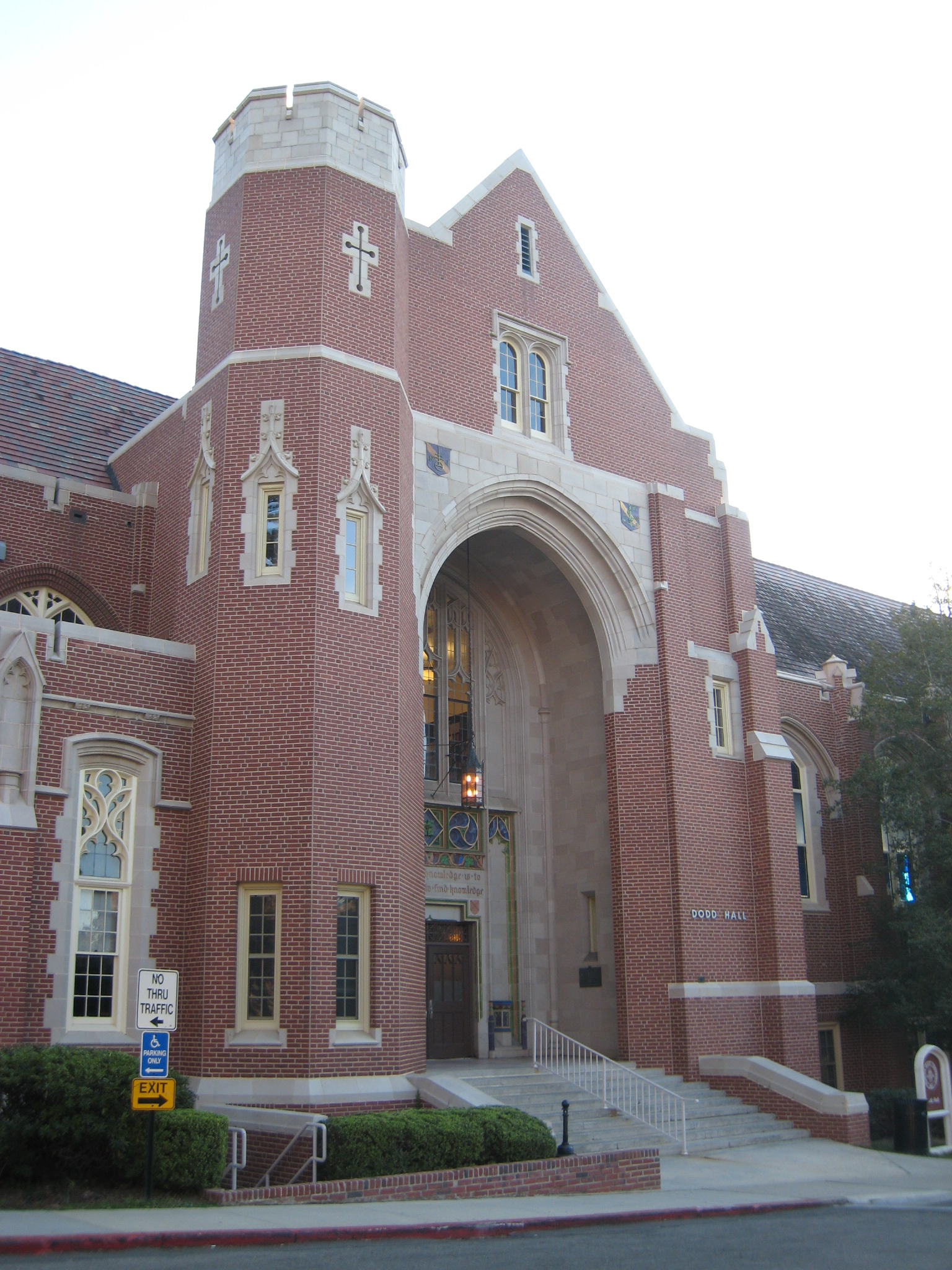
Dodd Hall of Florida State University, designed by Edwards & Sayward in the Collegiate Gothic style and completed in phases beginning in 1923

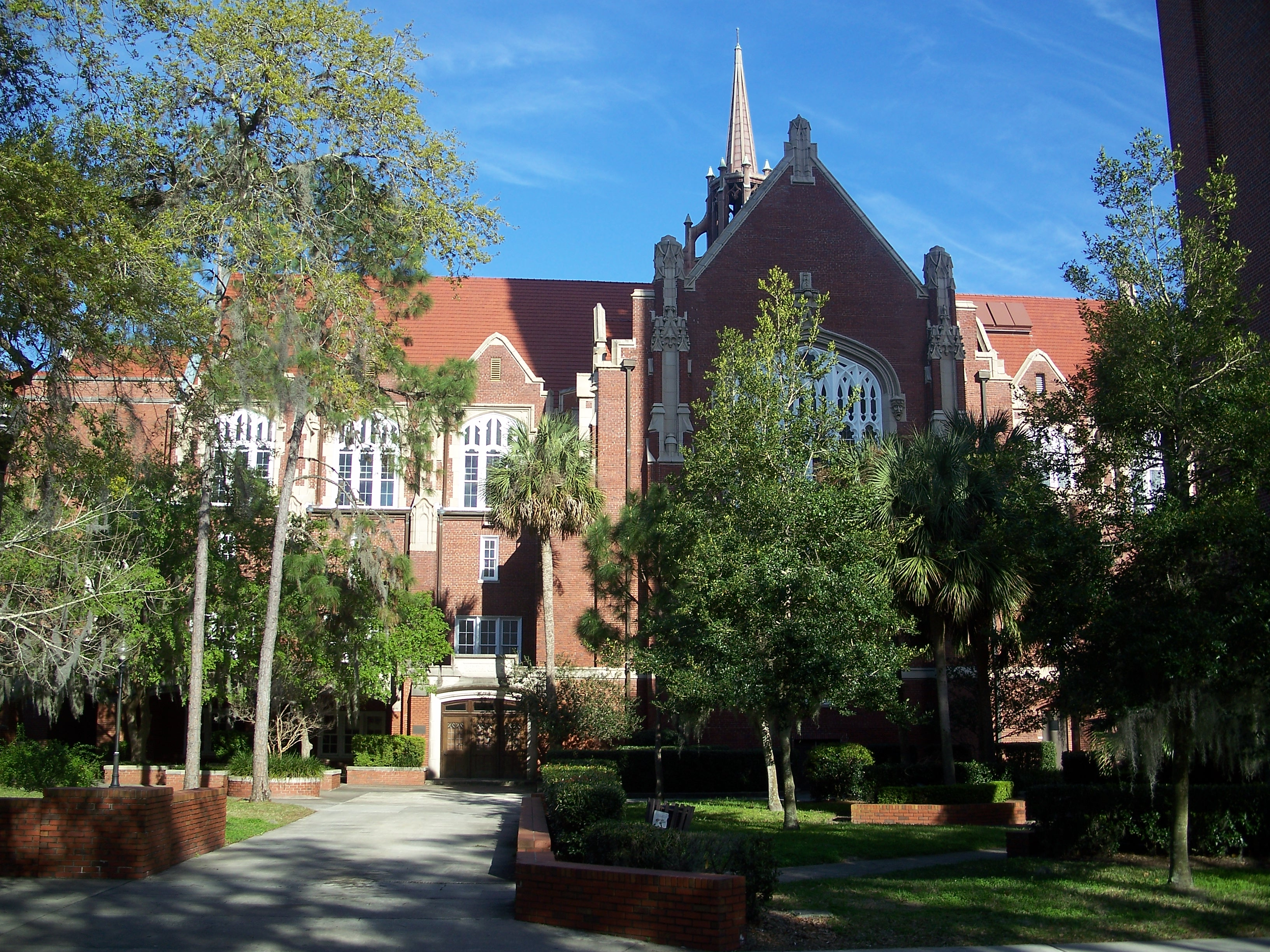
The University Auditorium of the University of Florida, designed by Edwards & Sayward in the Collegiate Gothic style and completed in 1924

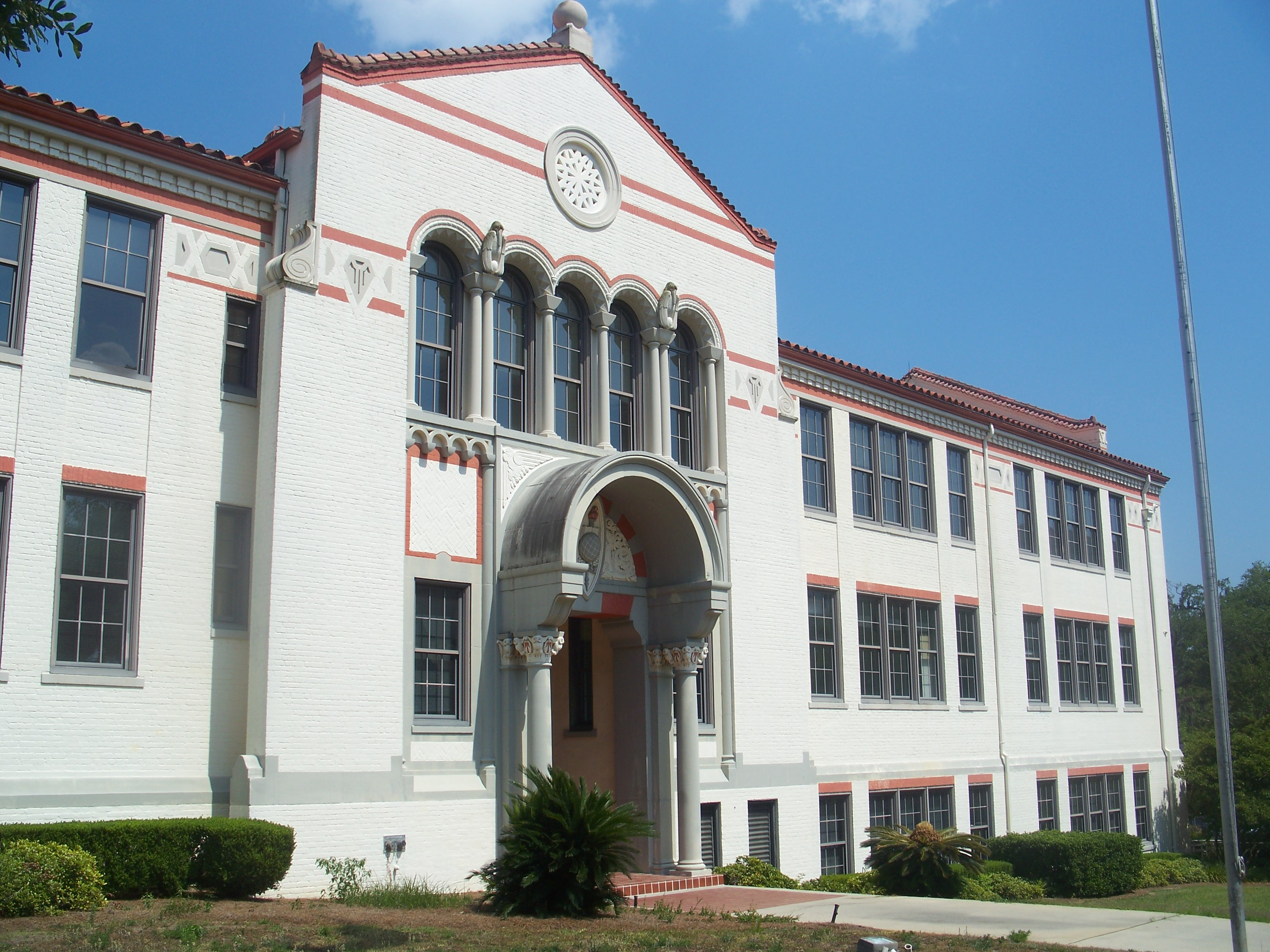
The Caroline Brevard Grammar School in Tallahassee, Florida, designed by Edwards & Sayward in the Mediterranean Revival style and completed in 1925

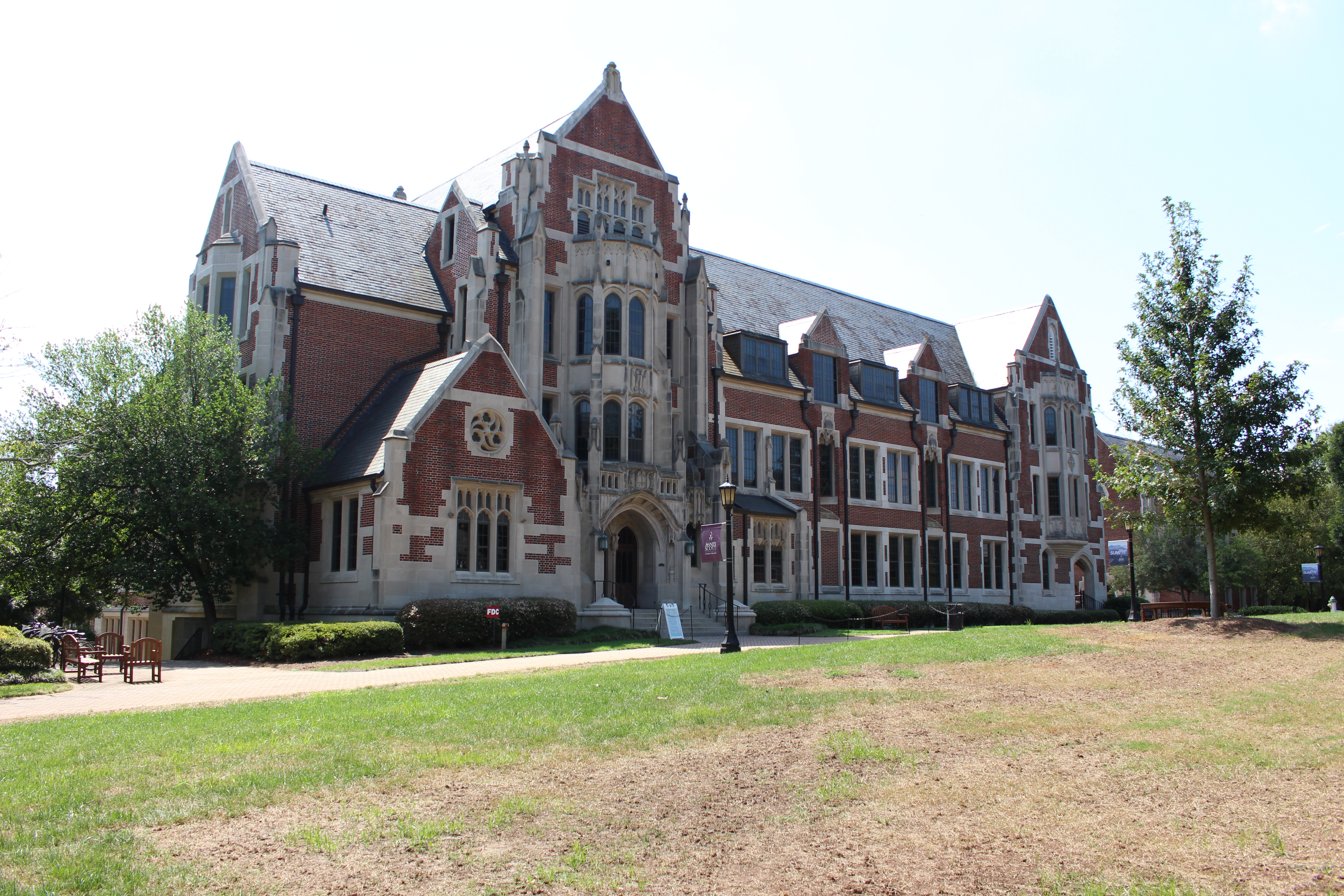
Buttrick Hall of Agnes Scott College, designed by Edwards & Sayward in the Collegiate Gothic style and completed in 1930

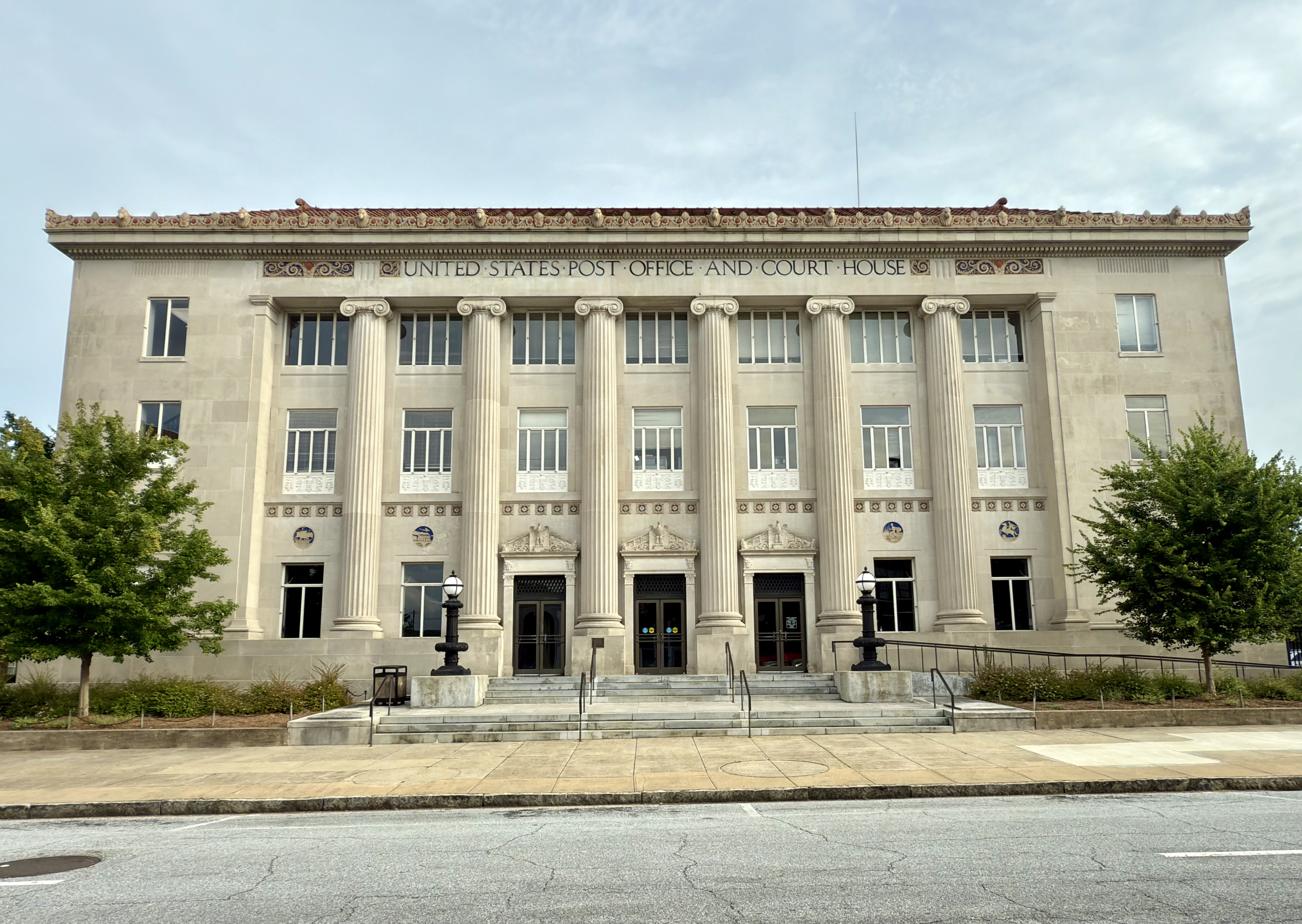
The United States Post Office and Courthouse in Columbus, Georgia, designed by Edwards & Sayward in the Neoclassical style and completed in 1933

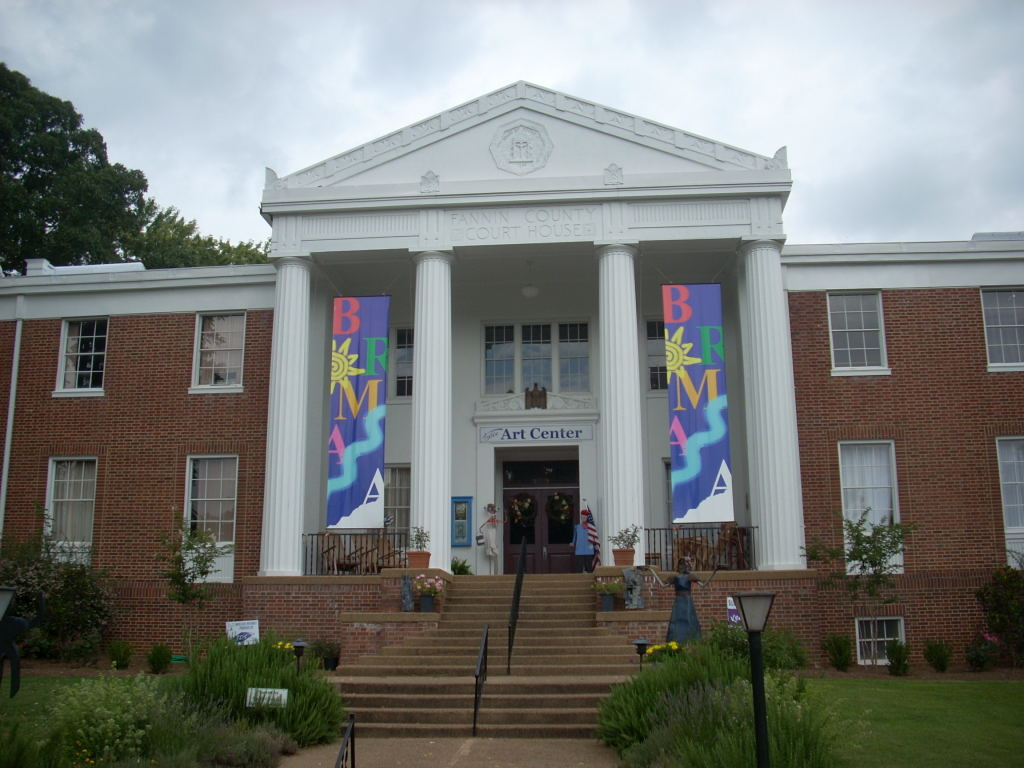
The former Fannin County Courthouse in Blue Ridge, Georgia, designed by Edwards & Sayward in the Greek Revival style and completed in 1937

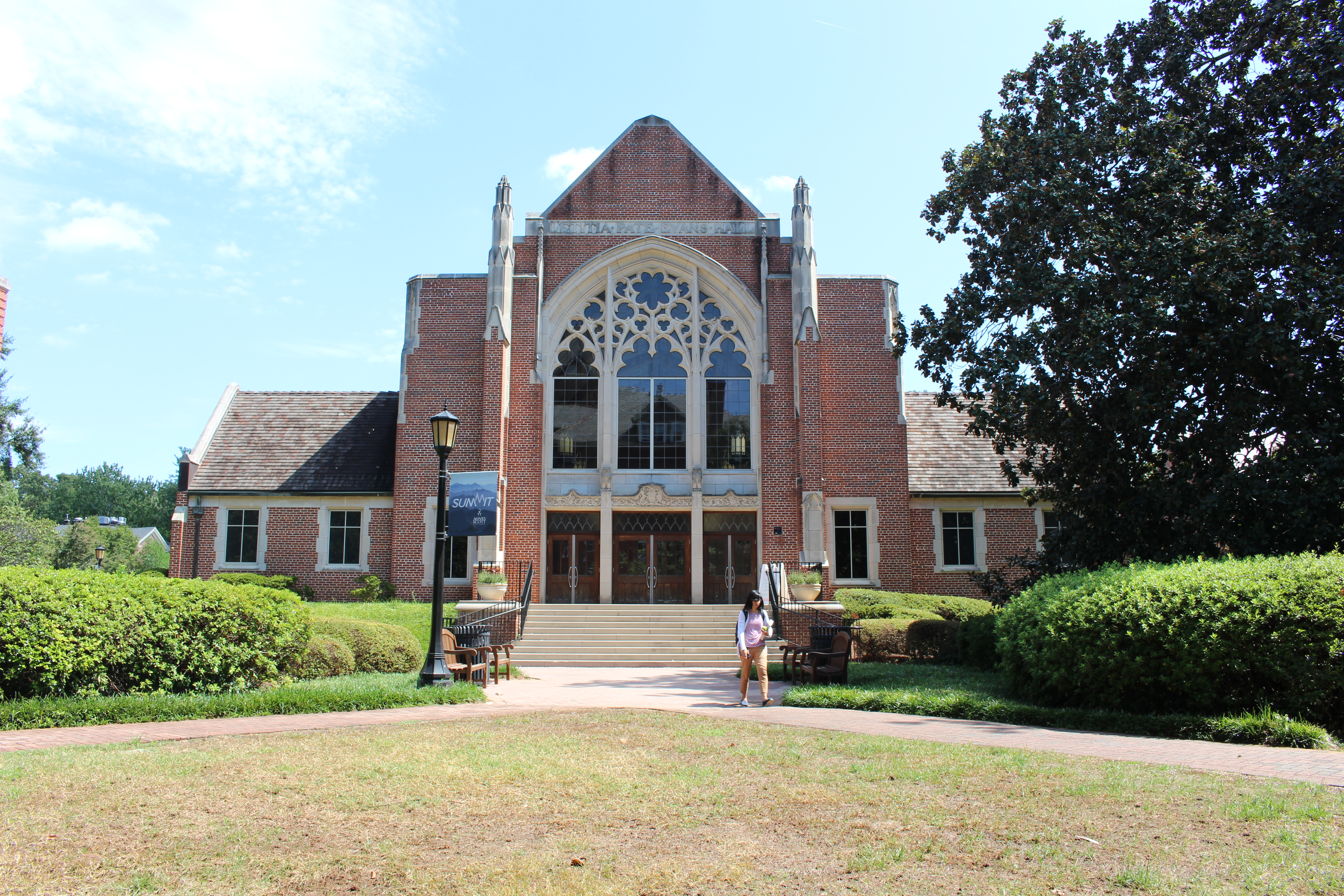
Letitia Pate Evans Hall of Agnes Scott College, designed by the successor firm of Logan & Williams in the Collegiate Gothic style and completed in 1950

William Augustus Edwards (December 8, 1866 – March 30, 1939) was an American architect. Based first in Columbia, South Carolina, and second in Atlanta, he was renowned for the educational buildings, courthouses and other public and private buildings that he designed in Florida, Georgia and his native South Carolina in the early 20th century. As Architect to the Florida Board of Control he designed his best known works, the Collegiate Gothic campuses of the University of Florida and Florida State University. Edwards' firm, founded by him in 1902, survived under his successors' leadership until 1971.

== Early life and education ==
William Augustus Edwards was born December 8, 1866, in Darlington, South Carolina, the son of Augustus F. Edwards, a lawyer and Confederate veteran, and Elizabeth Sarah Edwards, née Hart. After graduating from St. David's School in Society Hill, Edwards attended Richmond College, now the University of Richmond for one year and then entered the University of South Carolina where he received a degree in mechanical engineering in 1889.

== Career history ==
His activities between 1889 and 1893 to not appear to have been recorded. In the latter year he moved to Roanoke, Virginia, where he joined architect Charles C. Wilson, another Darlington County native, as a drafter. Wilson moved to Lynchburg in 1895 and to Columbia, South Carolina, in 1896, apparently accompanied by Edwards. In 1899 they formed a partnership, Wilson & Edwards, architects. Their most visible work was the First Baptist Church (1904) in Selma, Alabama, though construction delays meant it was not completed until two years after they dissolved their partnership in 1902.

In January 1902 Edwards formed the new partnership of Edwards & Walter with Frank C. Walter. In 1908 the partners moved to Atlanta, a city then rapidly expanding. There the firm was briefly known as Edwards, Walter & Parnham with C. D. Parnham. Edwards & Walter dissolved their partnership in 1910 and for five years Edwards practiced without a partner, the only time in his career where he would do so.

In 1915 he formed his last and longest-lasting partnership, Edwards & Sayward, with William J. Sayward, a Vermont native and a graduate of the Massachusetts Institute of Technology. In 1919, after World War I they were joined by Joseph F. Leitner, previously architect to the Atlantic Coast Line Railroad; like the previous association with Parham the partnership of Edwards, Sayward & Leitner only lasted a few months. Edwards & Sayward continued until Edwards' death in 1939.

Edwards was best known as an architect of institutional buildings, a reputation substantially built on his twenty-year relationship with the Florida Board of Control, which governed Florida's public institutions of higher learning. Shortly after its establishment the board organized a limited competition to pick an architect for the University of Florida. Only two architects were invited to submit plans: Edwards & Walter and Henry John Klutho of Jacksonville. Edwards & Walter submitted a Collegiate Gothic plan modeled on the English Oxbridge universities while Klutho proposed a Beaux-Arts plan. Edwards & Walter were selected University Architects in part because the board believed that their English image would compare favorably with other, older universities. The University of Florida opened the next year with its first two Edwards buildings: Buckman Hall (1906) and Thomas Hall (1906). Edwards was responsible for all future development for the next two decades, creating a cohesive Collegiate Gothic campus. His work at the university culminated in the University Auditorium (1924) and the Smathers Library (1926), monumental buildings intended as the first phases of larger administration and library buildings.

Edwards' role in Florida was initially that of University Architect, but his mandate soon expanded to include a new campus for Florida State University and buildings for Florida A&M University and the Florida School for the Deaf and Blind as Architect to the Board of Control. In 1925 an architectural department was established at the university under the leadership of Rudolph Weaver, who became the new architect to the board.

== Marriage and family ==
In 1898 Edwards was married to India Pearl Brown. They had three children, including two sons and one daughter. He was a Unitarian and a member of the American Institute of Architects. Edwards died March 30, 1939, in Atlanta at the age of 72.

One of his sons, H. Griffith Edwards, was also an architect. He graduated from Georgia Tech and worked for Edwards & Sayward and Henry J. Toombs until 1940, when he established an independent practice. In 1946 he also joined the Georgia Tech faculty. In 1956 he formed the partnership of Edwards & Portman with John C. Portman Jr., one of his students. He retired in 1968.

== Educational buildings ==
Among the academic institutions for which Edwards designed buildings were:

=== Alabama ===
- Tallapoosa Hall, Southern Preparatory Academy, Camp Hill

=== Florida ===
From 1905 to 1925, Edwards was architect for the Florida Board of Control and designed many buildings in the Collegiate Gothic style for the three existing state institutions of higher learning as well as other public schools.

==== University of Florida ====
As the main architect for Florida's newly reorganized system of higher education, Edwards designed numerous buildings for the University of Florida's new Gainesville campus, which first welcomed students in 1906. Most of his surviving works at the school had already been individually recognized by the National Register of Historic Places when the University of Florida Campus Historic District was established in the heart of the original campus in 1989.

Works include:

- Buckman Hall (Edwards & Walter, 1906)
  - NRHP-listed.
- Thomas Hall (1906, Edwards & Walter)
  - NRHP-listed.
- Flint Hall (Edwards & Walter, 1910)
  - NRHP-listed.
- Newell Hall (Edwards & Walter, 1910)
  - NRHP-listed.
- Benton Hall (Edwards, 1911)
  - Demolished in 1966.
- Griffin-Floyd Hall (Edwards, 1912)
  - NRHP-listed.
- Johnson Hall (Edwards, 1912)
  - Destroyed by fire in 1987.
- Anderson Hall (Edwards, 1913)
  - NRHP-listed.
- Peabody Hall (Edwards, 1913)
  - NRHP-listed.
- Bryan Hall (Edwards, 1914)
  - NRHP-listed.
- Ustler Hall (Edwards, 1915)
  - NRHP-listed.
- University Auditorium (Edwards & Sayward, 1924)
  - NRHP-listed.
- Smathers Library (Edwards & Sayward, 1926)
  - NRHP-listed.
- Rolfs Hall (Edwards & Walter, 1927)
  - NRHP-listed.

==== Florida State University ====
Buildings designed by Edwards for Florida State University include:

- Bryan Hall (Edwards & Walter, 1907)
- Westcott Building (Edwards & Walter, 1910)
- Reynolds Hall (Edwards, 1913)
- Suwannee Room (Edwards, 1913)
  - Originally the freestanding Suwannee Dining Hall, now a wing of the William Johnston Building.
- Broward Hall (Edwards & Sayward, 1917)
- Eppes Hall (Edwards & Sayward, 1918)
- Murphree Hall (Edwards & Sayward, 1922)
- Dodd Hall (Edwards & Sayward, 1923)

==== Florida A&M University ====
Buildings designed by Edwards for Florida A&M University include:

- Carnegie Library (Edwards & Walter, 1908)
- University Commons (Edwards & Sayward, 1924)

===== Other =====
- Caroline Brevard Grammar School, Tallahassee (Edwards & Sayward, 1925)
  - NRHP-listed.
- Old Lincoln High School, Tallahassee (Edwards & Sayward, 1929)
- Florida School for the Deaf and Blind, St. Augustine

=== Georgia ===
- West Hall, Valdosta State University, Valdosta (Edwards & Sayward, 1917)
- Campbell Hall, Columbia Theological Seminary, Decatur (Edwards & Sayward, 1927)
- Buttrick Hall, Agnes Scott College, Decatur (Edwards & Sayward, 1930)
- McCain Library, Agnes Scott College, Decatur (Edwards & Sayward, 1936)

=== South Carolina ===
- Judson Alumni Hall, Furman University, Greenville (Wilson & Edwards, 1900)
  - Demolished.
- Walhalla Graded School, Walhalla (Edwards & Walter, 1902)
  - NRHP-listed.
- Winnie Davis Hall, Limestone University, Gaffney (Edwards & Walter, 1904)
  - NRHP-listed.
- McMaster School, Columbia (Edwards & Walter, 1911)
  - NRHP-listed.
- Withers Building, Winthrop University, Rock Hill (Edwards, 1913)
  - NRHP-listed.
- Currell College, University of South Carolina, Columbia (Edwards & Sayward, 1919)

== Public buildings ==
Edwards designed many county courthouses and other public buildings, as follows:

=== Florida ===
- Hernando County Courthouse, Brooksville (Edwards, 1913)
- Sumter County Courthouse, Bushnell (Edwards, 1914)

=== Georgia ===
- Tift County Courthouse, Tifton (Edwards, 1913)
  - Neoclassical in style, NRHP-listed individually and as part of Tifton Commercial Historic District
- City Hall and Firehouse, Bainbridge (Edwards, 1914)
  - NRHP-listed.
- United States Post Office and Courthouse, Columbus (Edwards & Sayward, 1933)
  - NRHP-listed.
- former Fannin County Courthouse, Blue Ridge (Edwards & Sayward, 1937)
  - Replaced 2004 by a new courthouse next door. The old one is NRHP-listed and is now the Georgia Mountain Center for the Arts.

=== South Carolina ===
- Darlington County Courthouse, Darlington (Edwards & Walter, 1903)
  - Demolished.
- South Carolina State Armory, Columbia (Edwards & Walter, 1905)
  - NRHP-listed.
- Kershaw County Courthouse, Camden (Edwards & Walter, 1906)
  - Demolished.
- Sumter County Courthouse, Sumter (Edwards & Walter 1907)
  - NRHP-listed.
- Abbeville County Courthouse, Abbeville (Edwards & Walter, 1908)
  - NRHP-listed.
- Lee County Courthouse, Bishopville (Edwards & Walter, 1909)
  - NRHP-listed.
- Dillon County Courthouse, Dillon (Edwards, 1911)
  - NRHP-listed.
- Calhoun County Courthouse, St. Matthews (Edwards, 1913)
  - NRHP-listed.
- York County Courthouse, York (Edwards, 1914)
  - NRHP-listed.
- Jasper County Courthouse, Ridgeland (Edwards, 1915)
  - NRHP-listed.

== Other buildings ==
=== Florida ===
- Covington House, Tallahassee (Edwards & Sayward, 1927)
  - NRHP-listed.
- Exchange Bank Building, Tallahassee (Edwards & Sayward, 1928)
  - NRHP-listed.
- Hotel Thomas, Gainesville (Edwards & Sayward, 1928)
  - Originally built as the home of William Reuben Thomas and rebuilt by him as a hotel. NRHP-listed.

=== Georgia ===
- Odd Fellows Building and Auditorium, Atlanta (Edwards, 1912)
  - NRHP-listed.
- Unitarian Church of Atlanta, Atlanta (Edwards, 1915)
  - Demolished.
- former Bank of Tifton, Tifton (Edwards & Sayward, 1917)
  - A C&S Bank in 1985, "a fine example of the Neoclassical style", a contributing building to the NRHP-listed Tifton Commercial Historic District
- Pythagoras Lodge No. 41, Free and Accepted Masons, Decatur (Edwards & Sayward, 1924)
  - Designed principally by Sayward, who lived in Decatur and was a member of the lodge. NRHP-listed.
- University Homes, Atlanta (Edwards & Sayward, 1937)
  - A segregated public housing project for Black residents. Demolished.
- One or more works in Lakewood Heights Historic District, Atlanta
  - NRHP-listed.
- One or more works in Southern Railway North Avenue Yards Historic District, Atlanta
  - NRHP-listed.

=== South Carolina ===
- Abbeville Opera House, Abbeville (Edwards & Walter, 1904)
  - NRHP-listed.
- Cain House, Columbia (Edwards, 1912)
  - Now The Inn at USC.
- Union National Bank Building, Columbia (Edwards, 1913)
  - NRHP-listed.

== Legacy ==
After Edwards' 1939 death, Sayward continued the firm as Sayward & Logan with Robert B. Logan, a long-time employee. Under than name the firm built little due to World War II. After Sayward died in 1945, Logan continued the firm as Sayward, Logan & Williams with H. Eugene Williams, an employee since 1929. Sayward's name was dropped in 1948. Logan, who had maintained the firm's adherence to the Collegiate Gothic and other revival styles, died in 1962 and the firm, with the addition of Larry Craig Dean, was renamed Williams & Dean. After Dean's departure the firm became Williams & Associates in 1968 and Williams died in 1971.

Works of the successor firm include Presser Hall (1940) and Letitia Pate Evans Hall (1950) of Agnes Scott College, the John Bulow Campbell Library (1952) of the Columbia Theological Seminary, the Emory Presbyterian Church (1954) in Atlanta, the Monastery of the Holy Spirit (1959) in Conyers, the Peachtree Presbyterian Church (1960) in Atlanta and three high-rise dormitories for the University of Georgia: Creswell Hall (1965), Brumby Hall (1966) and Russell Hall (1967).

More than 25 works by Edwards and his partners have been listed on the National Register of Historic Places, either as individual buildings or as contributing buildings within historic districts.
