= Covington House (Tallahassee, Florida) =

Historic house in Florida, United States

- U.S. National Register of Historic Places
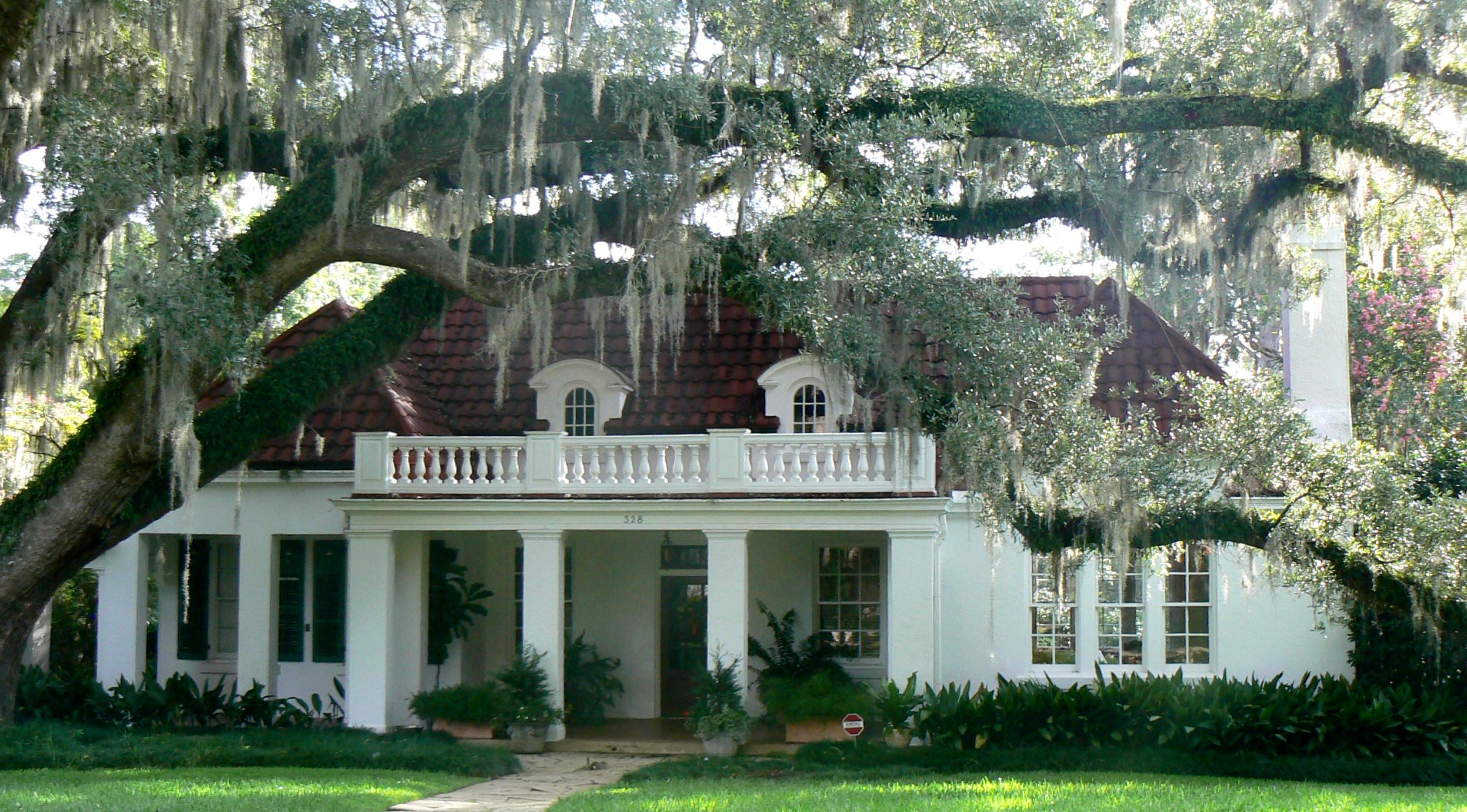
- The Covington House

- Location within Florida Location within the United States
- Location: Tallahassee, Florida
- Coordinates: 30°27′42″N 84°16′30″W
- Built: 1927
- Architect: William Augustus Edwards
- Architectural style: Renaissance
- NRHP reference No.: 89001386
- Added to NRHP: September 7, 1989

The Covington House (also known as the Schendel House) is a historic house located in Tallahassee, Florida.

== Description and history ==
Built in 1927, it was designed by architect William Augustus Edwards. On September 7, 1989, it was added to the National Register of Historic Places.
