= Sumter County Courthouse (Florida) =

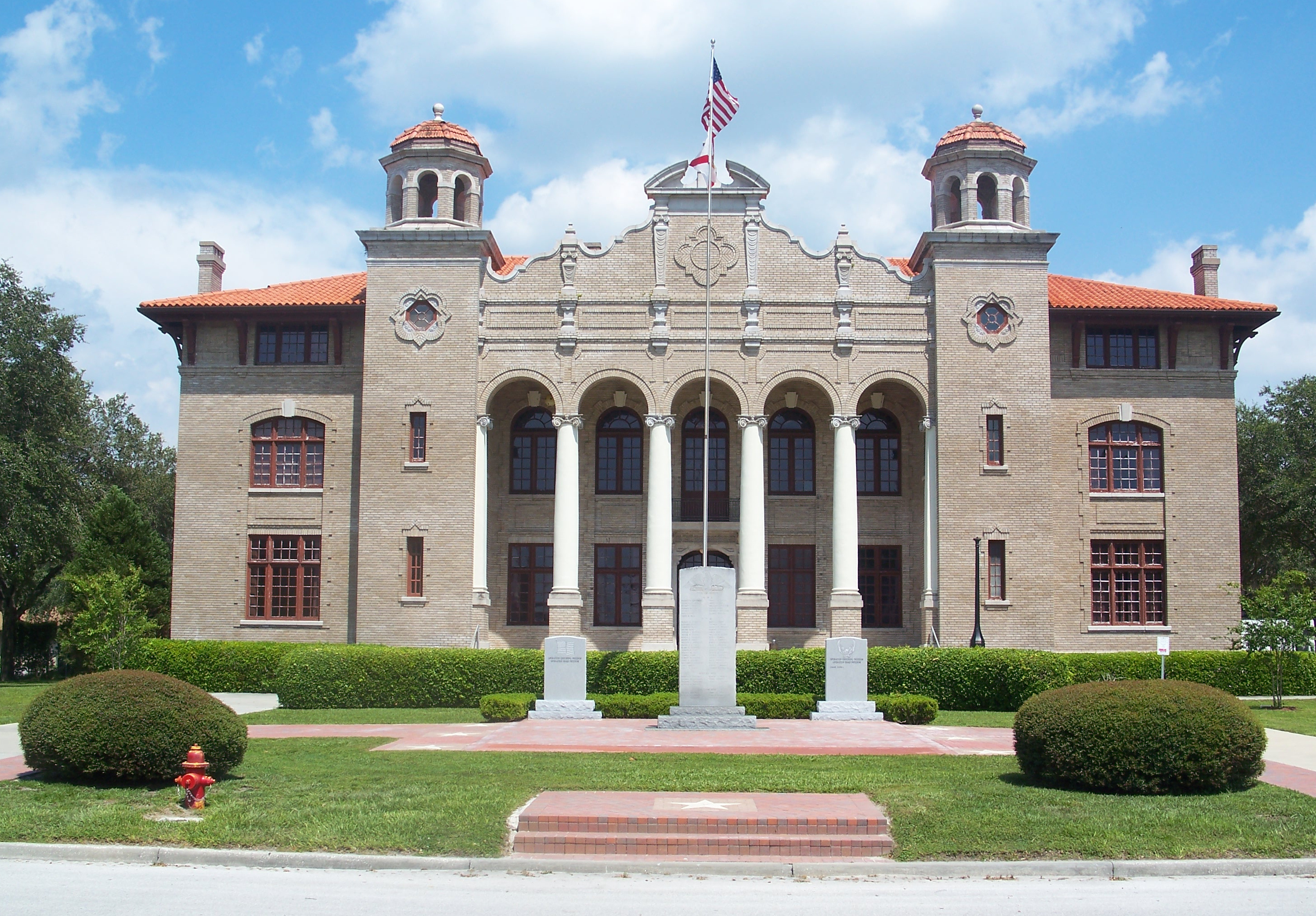
- Interactive map of the Sumter County Courthouse area

General information
- Architectural style: Beaux-Arts
- Location: Bushnell, Florida, United States
- Coordinates: 28.663771°N 82.11054°W
- Construction started: 1912
- Completed: 1914

Design and construction
- Architect: William Augustus Edwards

The Sumter County Courthouse, built in 1912–1914, is an historic courthouse building located in Bushnell, Florida. The total costs of construction for the courthouse were $56,000. It was designed by Atlanta-based architect William Augustus Edwards who designed one other courthouse in Florida, two in Georgia and nine in South Carolina as well as academic buildings at 12 institutions in Florida, Georgia and South Carolina. He designed most of the original buildings on the campus of the University of Florida in Gainesville. In 1989, The Sumter County Courthouse was listed in A Guide to Florida's Historic Architecture, published by the University of Florida Press.

There is now a much larger Sumter County Judicial Building nearby which bears a striking resemblance to the 1912-1914 courthouse because it incorporates much of its architectural features in its central facade.

On November 26, 2013, Sumter County officials unveiled renovations to the Sumter County Courthouse including refinished walls, doors, new mechanical, electrical, and plumbing fixtures, fire protection, technological improvements and accessibility upgrades. The cost of the renovations was approximated at $8 million.

== See also ==
- Sumter County Courthouse (South Carolina), also designed by William Augustus Edwards
