= South Carolina State Armory =

- U.S. National Register of Historic Places
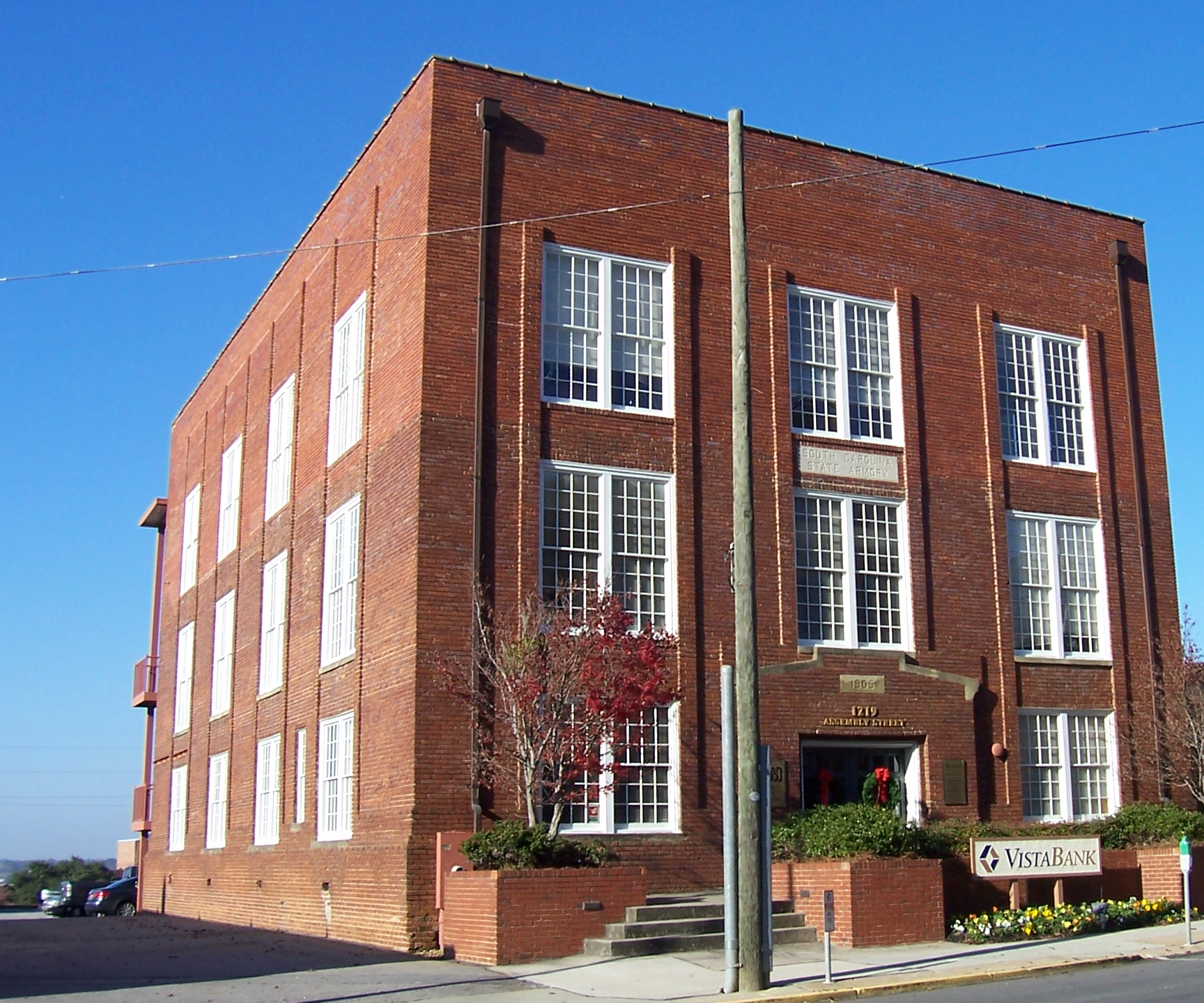

- Location within South Carolina Location within the United States
- Location: Columbia, South Carolina
- Coordinates: 34.0015°N 81.0360°W
- Built: 1905
- Architect: William Augustus Edwards & Frank C. Walter
- Architectural style: Early Commercial
- NRHP reference No.: 99000099
- Added to NRHP: February 5, 1999

The South Carolina State Armory, built in 1905, is an historic National Guard building located at 1219 Assembly Street near the State House in Columbia, South Carolina.

== History ==
The armory was designed in the Early Commercial style by noted Columbia architect William Augustus Edwards and his partner Frank C. Walter. It was used as an armory until 1964 when the South Carolina National Guard vacated it for a new building. It is now privately owned and is used for office space,

On February 5, 1999, it was added to the National Register of Historic Places.

== See also ==
- List of Registered Historic Places in South Carolina
