= Currell College =

- U.S. Historic district – Contributing property
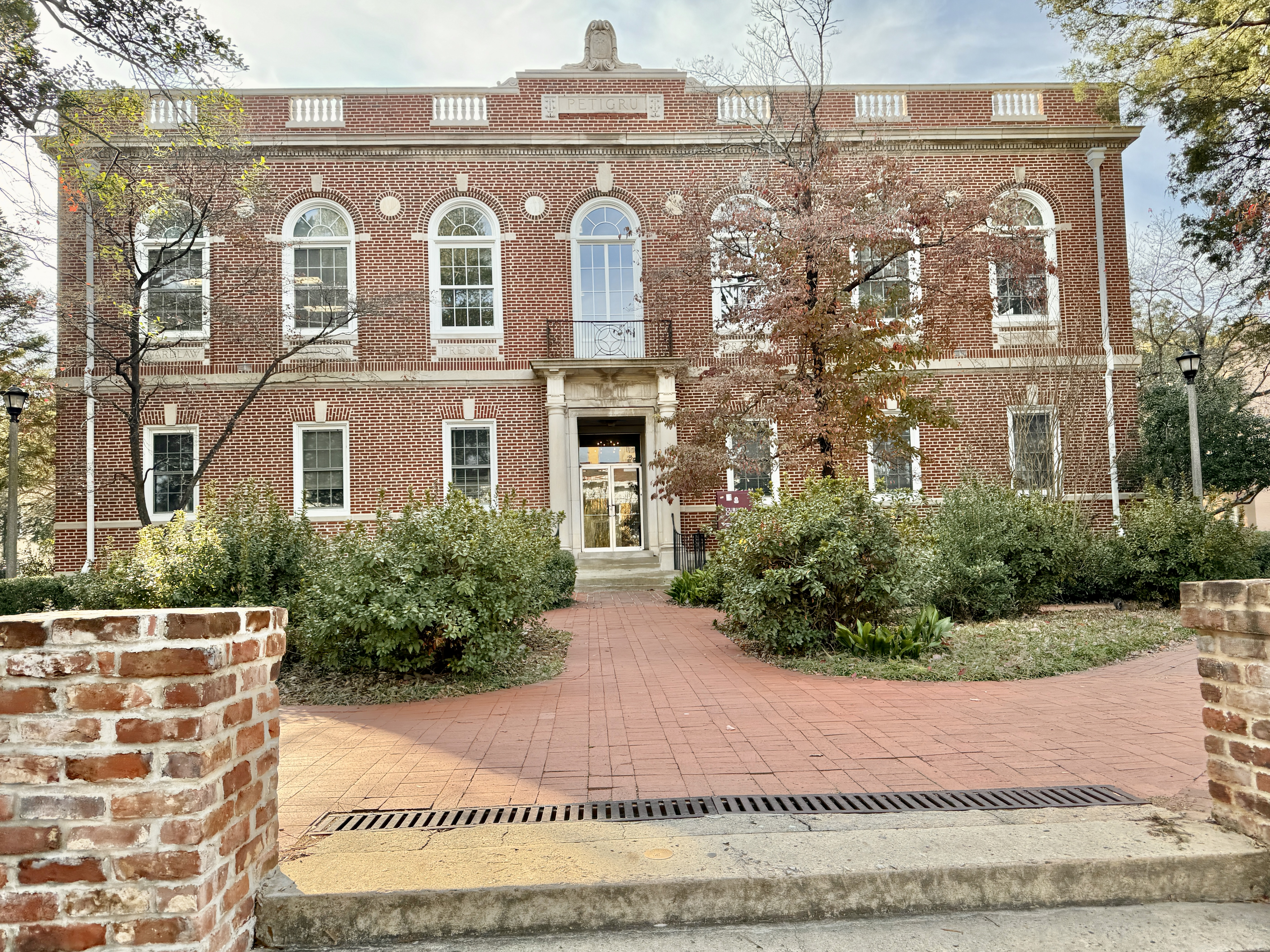
- Currell College in 2023

- Location within South Carolina Location within the United States
- Location: Columbia, South Carolina
- Coordinates: 34°0′1″N 81°1′38″W
- Built: 1915–1919
- Architect: William Augustus Edwards of Edwards & Saywards, Atlanta
- Architectural style: Late Gothic Revival

Currell College, completed in 1919, is an historic two-story redbrick university building on the campus of the University of South Carolina (USC) in Columbia, South Carolina in the United States. It was designed by Darlington native William Augustus Edwards who designed academic buildings at 12 institutions of higher learning as well as 13 courthouses and numerous other buildings in Florida, Georgia and South Carolina. Currell, which is pronounced as if it were spelled Curl, is the only building that Edwards built for USC. The Cain House at 1619 Pendleton Street which he designed in 1912 for a private owner, though, is now part of the expanded USC campus and is used as The Inn at USC.

The school was built as a law School Building, and was originally named Petigru college in honor of distinguished Charlestone attorney James L. Petigru (1789–1863).

== History ==
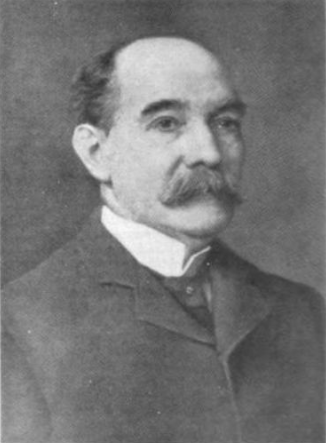
William S. Currell (1858–1943)

It was originally named Petigru College and was built to serve as the USC law school, which had outgrown its quarters in Legare College. When a new law school building was built in 1952, the name Petigru College was given to it and the 1919 building was renamed Currell College to honor William S. Currell, USC's president when it was built, and it was then used by the history department.

The building's redbrick exterior was a departure from USC's standard of gray-painted stucco over brick on all of its previous buildings, except the South Caroliniana Library and Lieber College, and according to USC historian Daniel Walker Hollis: "... it has been something of an architectural misfit on the inner campus ever since."

In the mid-1950s the two-story Currell College Annex was built to the south of the 1919 building and joined to it by a two-story glass and metal stairwell-hallway structure. The annex, while built of redbrick, is utilitarian and does not continue the collegiate Gothic features of the original building.

Currell College today is the home of the USC Department of Criminology and Criminal Justice. The Currell College Annex houses the USC Office of Special Events.

The 1919 building excluding the annex is a contributing property in the Old Campus District, University of South Carolina, which was added to the National Register of Historic Places on June 5, 1970.

== See also ==
- List of Registered Historic Places in South Carolina
