= Hernando County Courthouse =

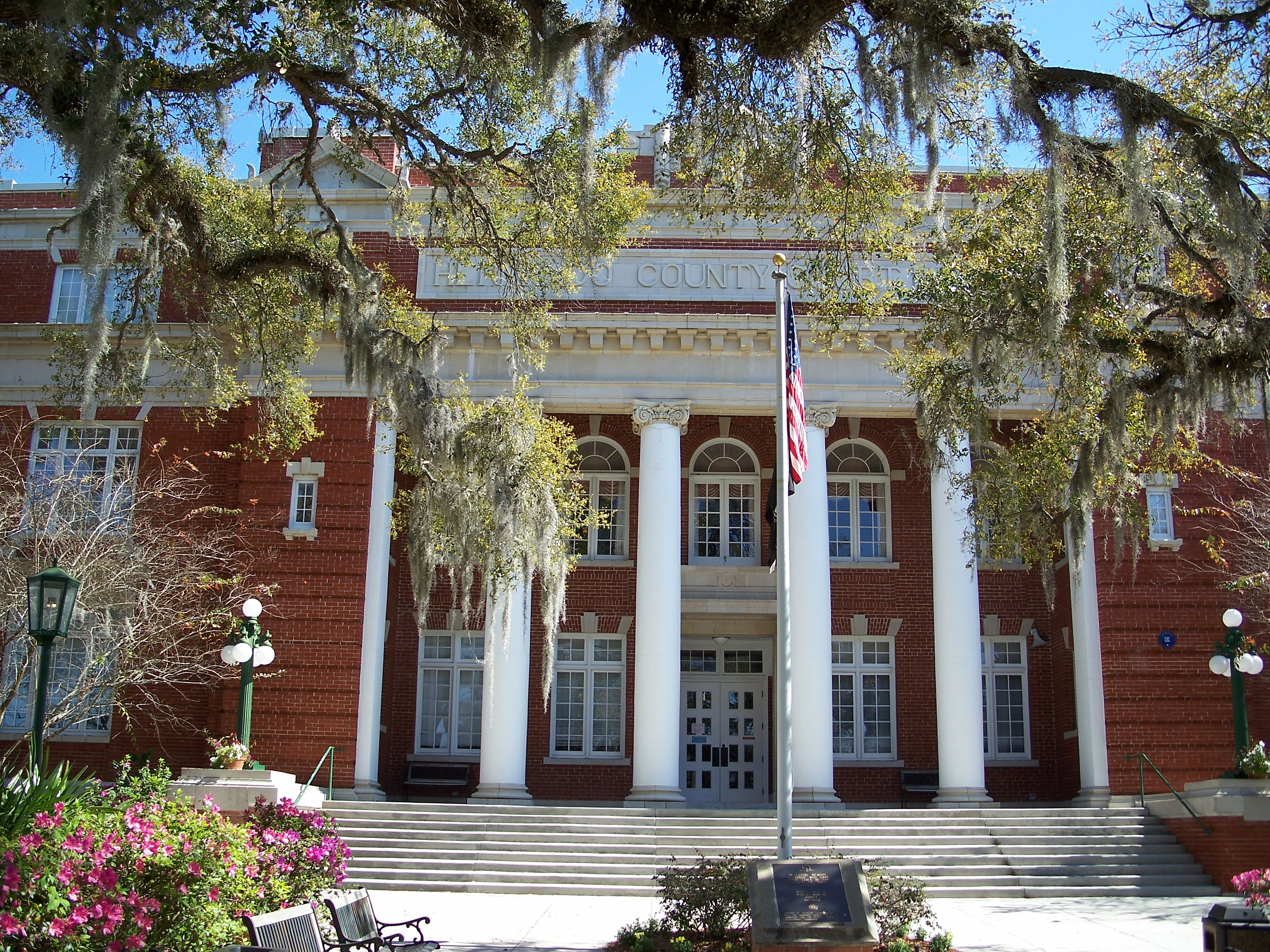
- Interactive map of the Hernando County Courthouse area

General information
- Architectural style: Beaux-Arts
- Location: Brooksville, Florida, United States
- Coordinates: 28.55527°N 82.38786°W
- Completed: 1913

Design and construction
- Architect: William Augustus Edwards

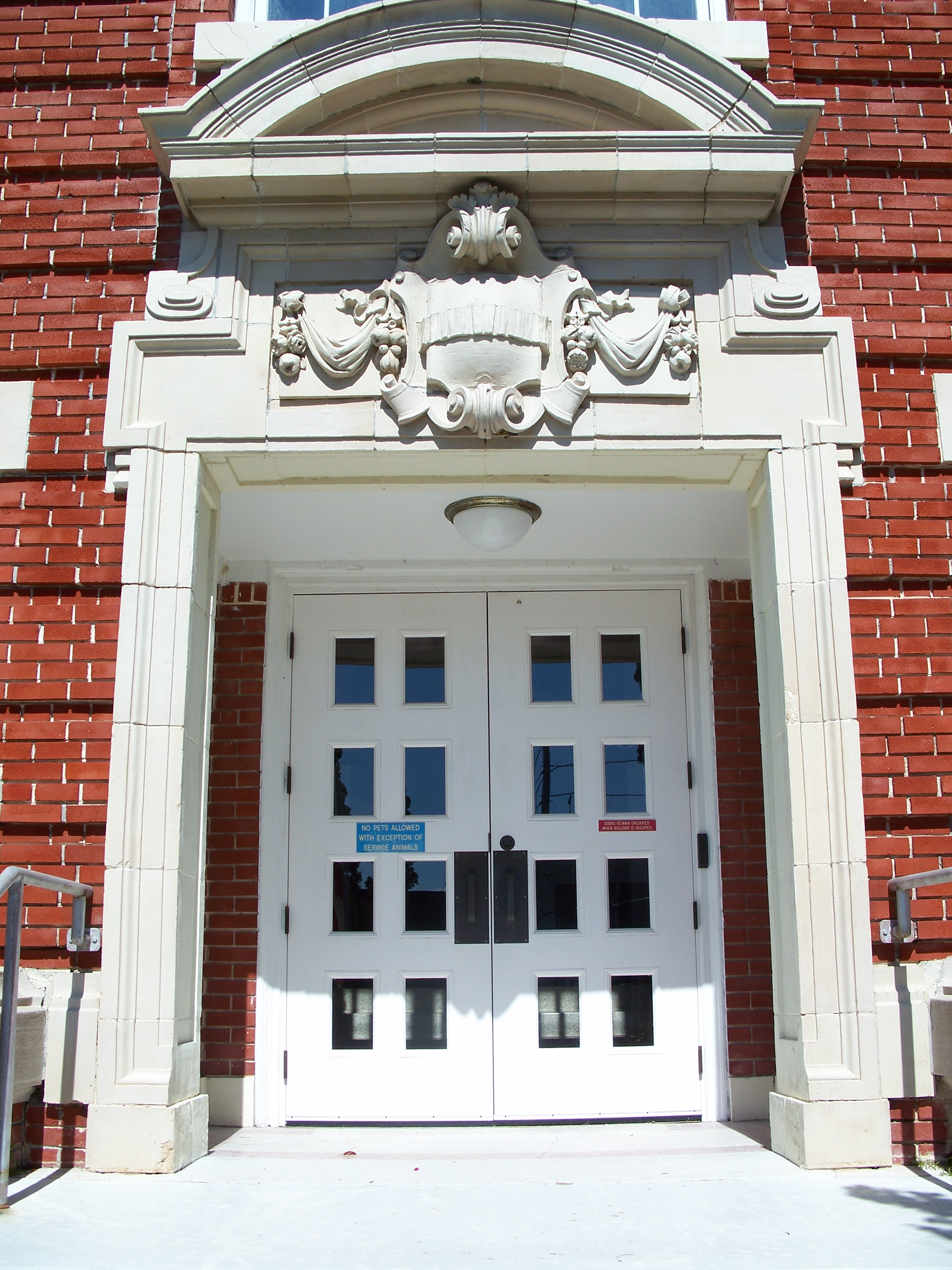
Courthouse detail

The Hernando County Courthouse, built in 1913, is an historic courthouse building located in Brooksville, Florida. It was designed by Atlanta-based architect William Augustus Edwards who designed one other courthouse in Florida, two in Georgia and nine in South Carolina as well as academic buildings at 12 institutions in Florida, Georgia and South Carolina. He designed most of the original buildings on the campus of the University of Florida in Gainesville.

The courthouse been called the Brooksville crown. In 1989, The Hernando County Courthouse was listed in A Guide to Florida's Historic Architecture, published by the University of Florida Press.
