= Caroline Brevard Grammar School =

- U.S. National Register of Historic Places
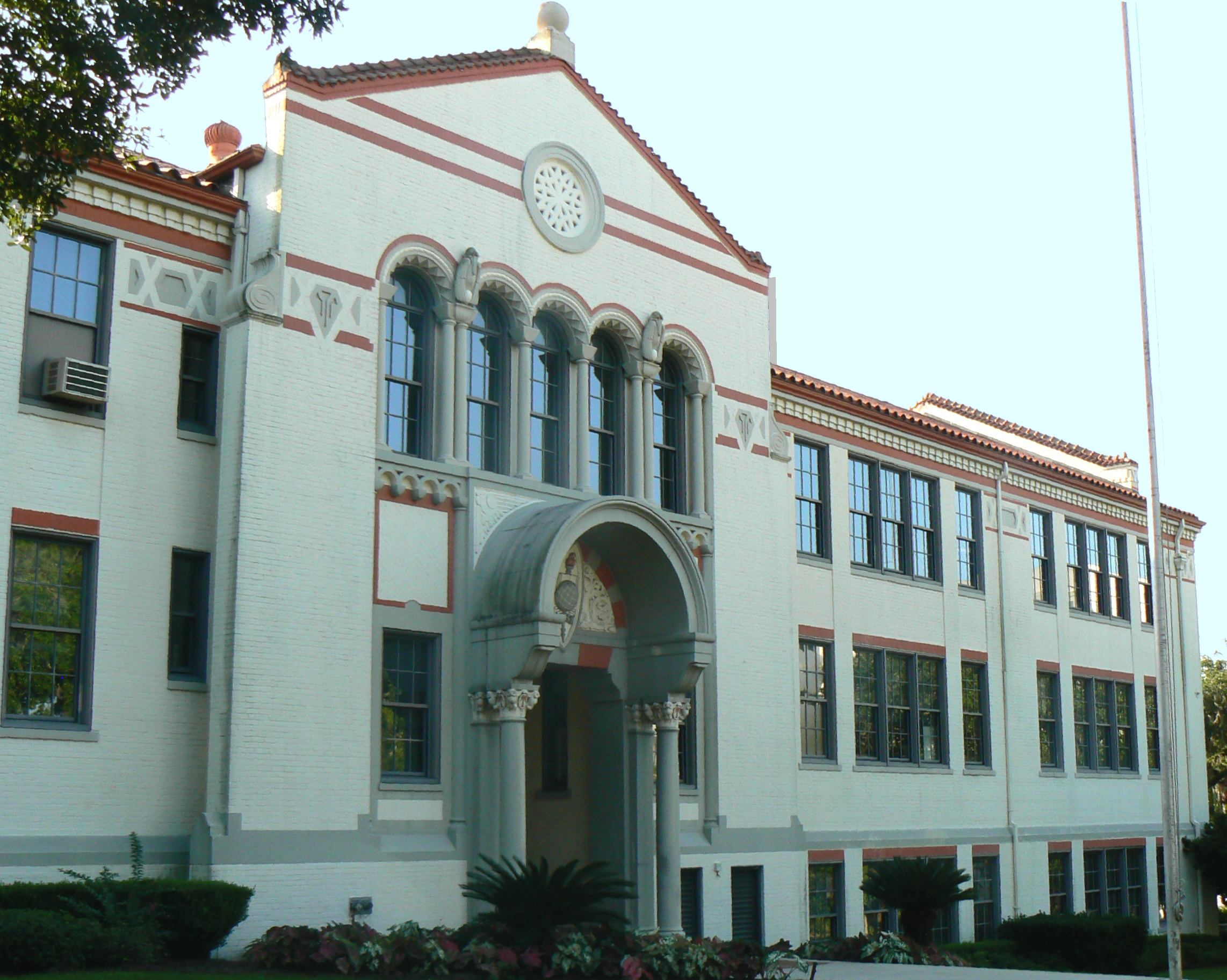

- Location within Florida Location within the United States
- Location: Tallahassee, Florida
- Coordinates: 30°26′9″N 84°16′45″W
- NRHP reference No.: 87002151
- Added to NRHP: 17 December 1987

The Caroline Brevard Grammar School (also known as the Bloxham Building) is a historic school in Tallahassee, Florida. It is located at 727 South Calhoun Street and was designed by architect, William Augustus Edwards. On December 17, 1987, it was added to the U.S. National Register of Historic Places.

It is currently being used by the Leon County School District to house services of community-wide interest. As of June 2016 the following offices were located in the Bloxham Building:

- AmeriCorps Tallahassee
- Families in Transition
- Florida Diagnostic and Learning Resource System (FDLRS)
- Foundation for Leon County Schools
- Home Education
- Records Department
- School Choice & Reassignment
- University Intern and Field Experience Office
- Virtual School, Leon County (LCVS)
- Whole Child Leon
