= Walhalla Graded School =

- U.S. National Register of Historic Places
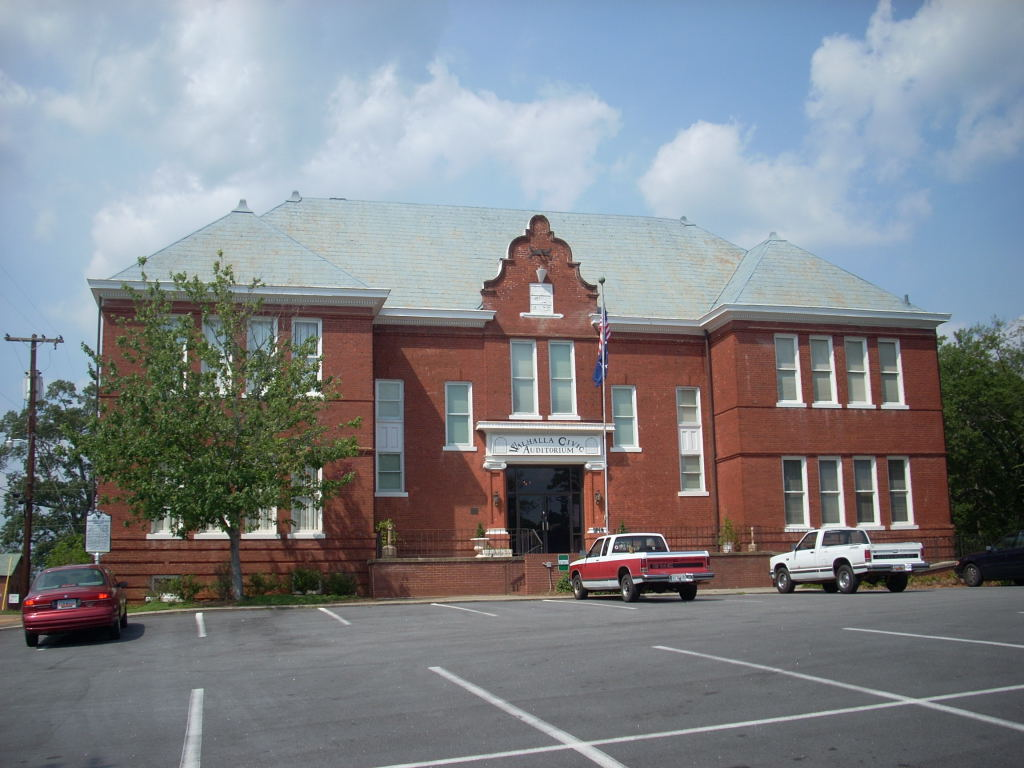
- Walhalla Civic Auditorium

- Location within South Carolina Location within the United States
- Location: 101 E. N. Broad St., Walhalla, South Carolina
- Coordinates: 34°46′0″N 83°3′55″W
- Area: less than one acre
- Built: 1901
- Architect: William Augustus Edwards of Edwards & Walter; Grandy & Jordan of Greenville, builders
- Architectural style: Classical Revival
- NRHP reference No.: 92000059
- Added to NRHP: February 13, 1992

The Walhalla Graded School, built in 1901, is an historic building located at 101 E. North Broad Street in Walhalla, South Carolina. It was designed by noted Columbia architect William Augustus Edwards of the firm of Edwards and Walter and built by Grandy & Jordan of Greenville.

On February 13, 1992, it was added to the National Register of Historic Places. At the time of registration the building housed district offices for the School District of Oconee County. It is currently used as the Walhalla Civic Auditorium

== See also ==
- List of Registered Historic Places in South Carolina
