= Exchange Bank Building (Tallahassee, Florida) =

- U.S. National Register of Historic Places
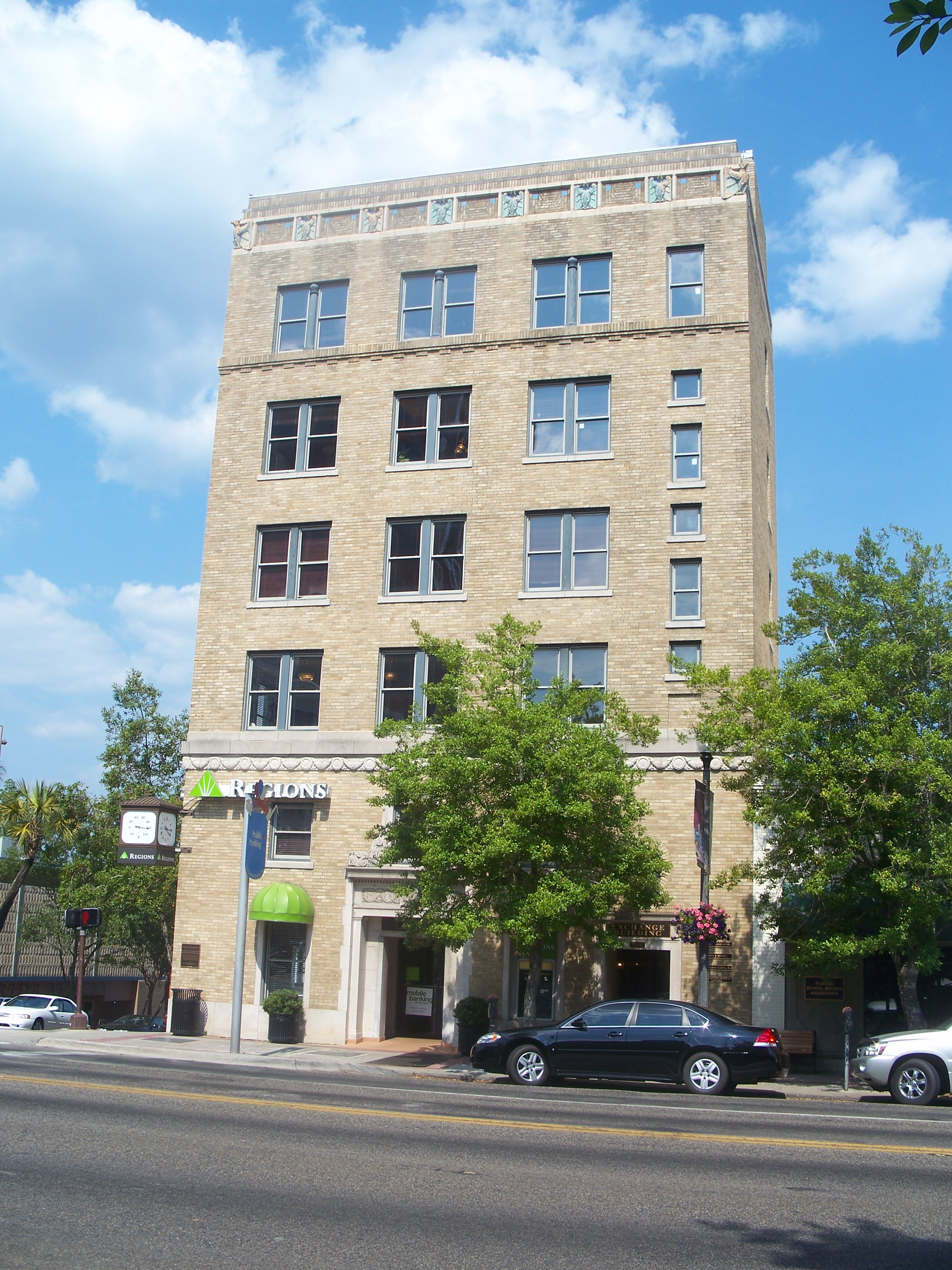

- Location within Florida Location within the United States
- Location: Tallahassee, Florida
- Coordinates: 30°26′25″N 84°16′50″W
- Architectural style: Early Commercial
- NRHP reference No.: 84000262
- Added to NRHP: November 29, 1984

The Exchange Bank Building (also known as the Midyette-Moor Building) is a historic bank building in Tallahassee, Florida. It is located at 201 South Monroe Street and was designed by architect William Augustus Edwards. It was added to the National Register of Historic Places in 1984.
