= Pythagoras Lodge No. 41, Free and Accepted Masons =

- U.S. National Register of Historic Places
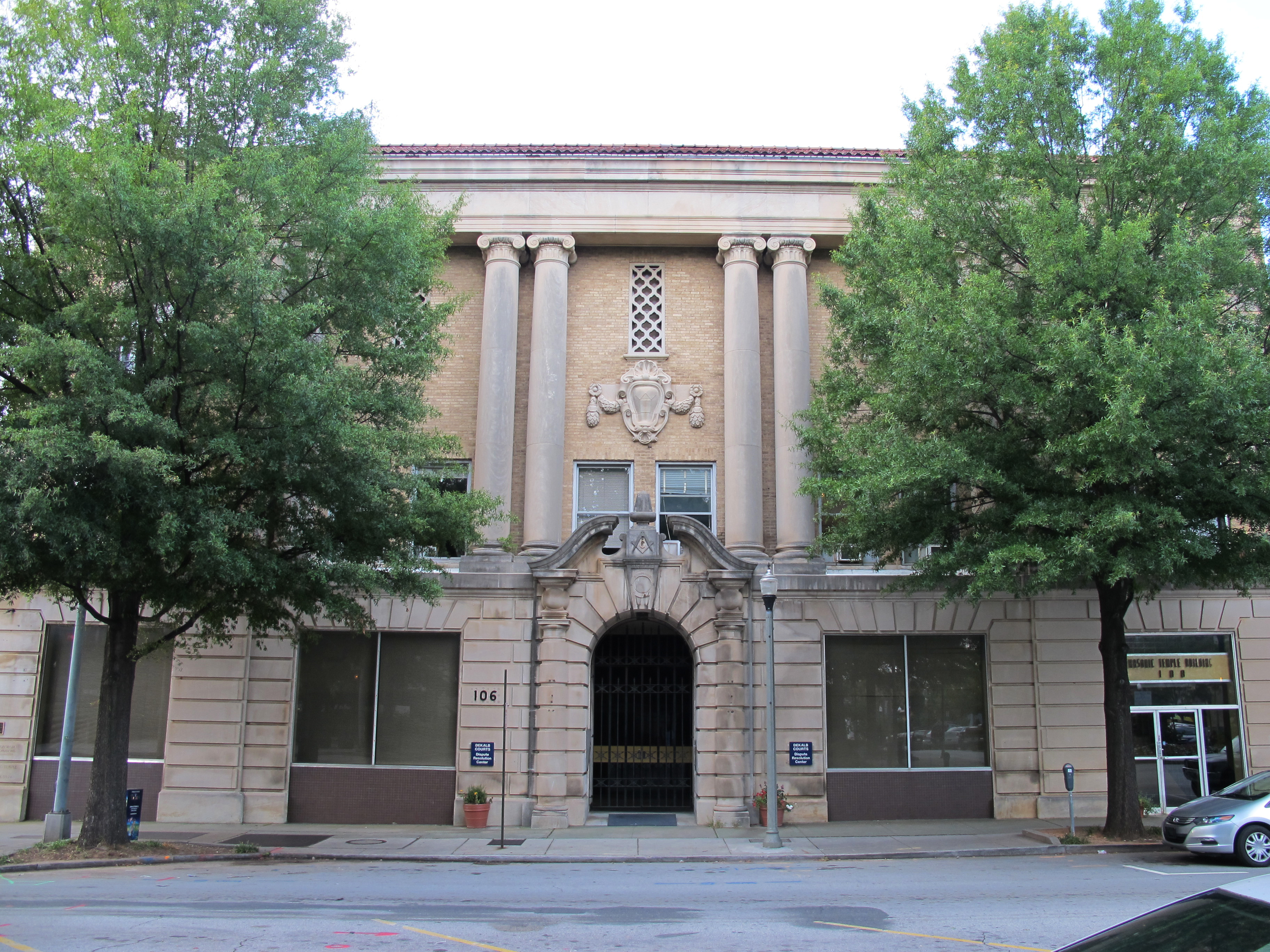

- Location within Atlanta Location within Georgia Location within the United States
- Location: 136 E. Ponce de Leon Ave., Decatur, Georgia
- Coordinates: 33°46′32″N 84°17′47″W
- Area: less than one acre
- Built: 1924
- Built by: Arnold Construction Co.
- Architect: Sayward, William J.
- Architectural style: Beaux Arts
- NRHP reference No.: 82004664
- Added to NRHP: August 19, 1982

The name "Pythagoras Lodge No. 41, Free and Accepted Masons" is used by the National Register of Historic Places when referring to a historic building located in Decatur, Georgia. The building is also known as Pythagoras Masonic Temple and occasionally known as Decatur Masonic Temple. Built in 1924, the building is a work of William J. Sayward (1875-1945), an architect who was a member of the Masonic lodge, and who partnered with William A. Edwards in the firm Edwards and Sayward. It was designed and built in Beaux Arts architecture style.

The building was listed on the National Register of Historic Places in 1982. It was deemed significant for its architecture and for the social/community history of the lodge.

The building was constructed as a Masonic hall by Pythagoras Lodge No. 41, Free and Accepted Masons, one of several Masonic Lodges which meet in Decatur. The Lodge received its charter in 1844, and has functioned continuously since then.

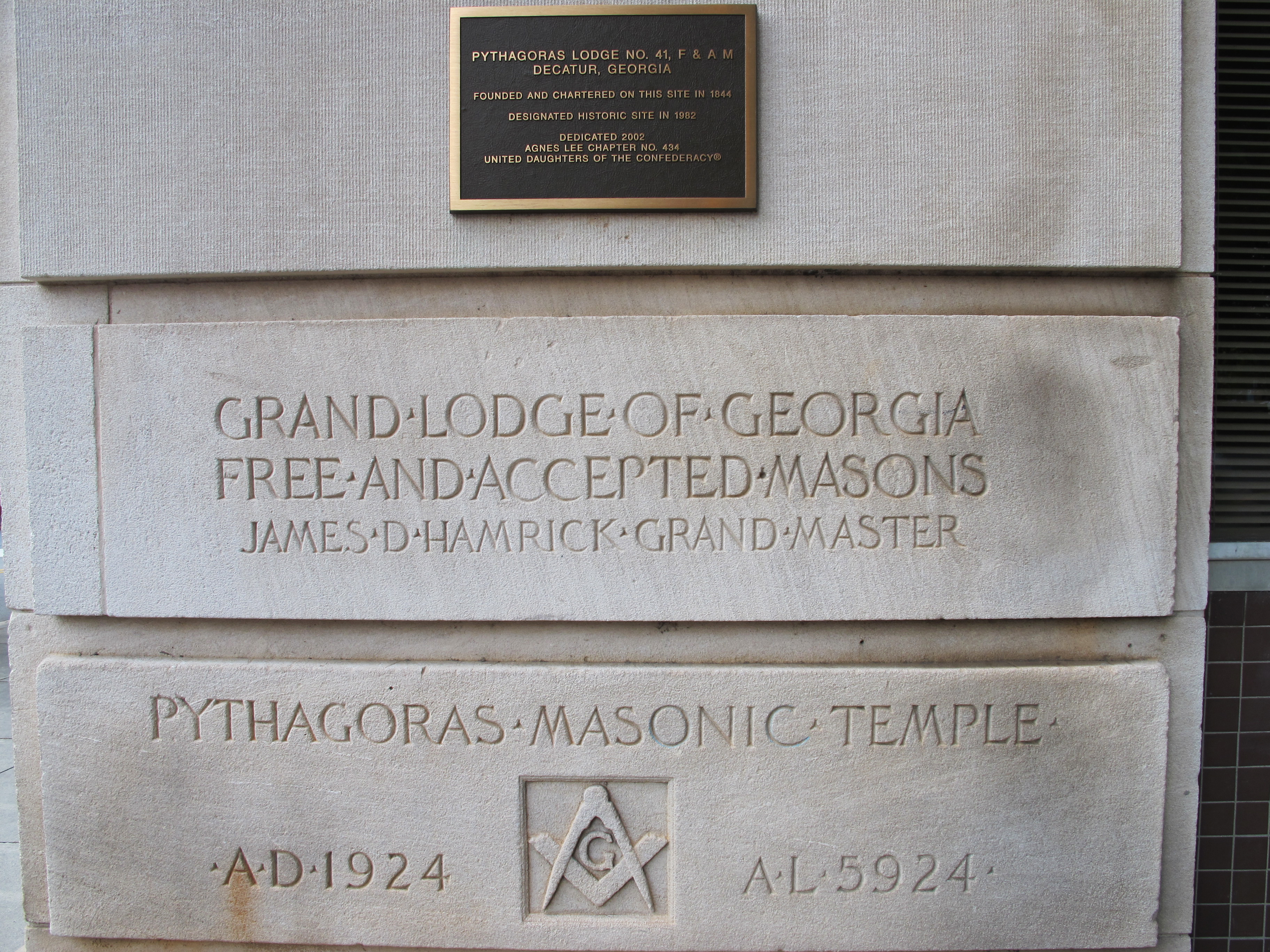

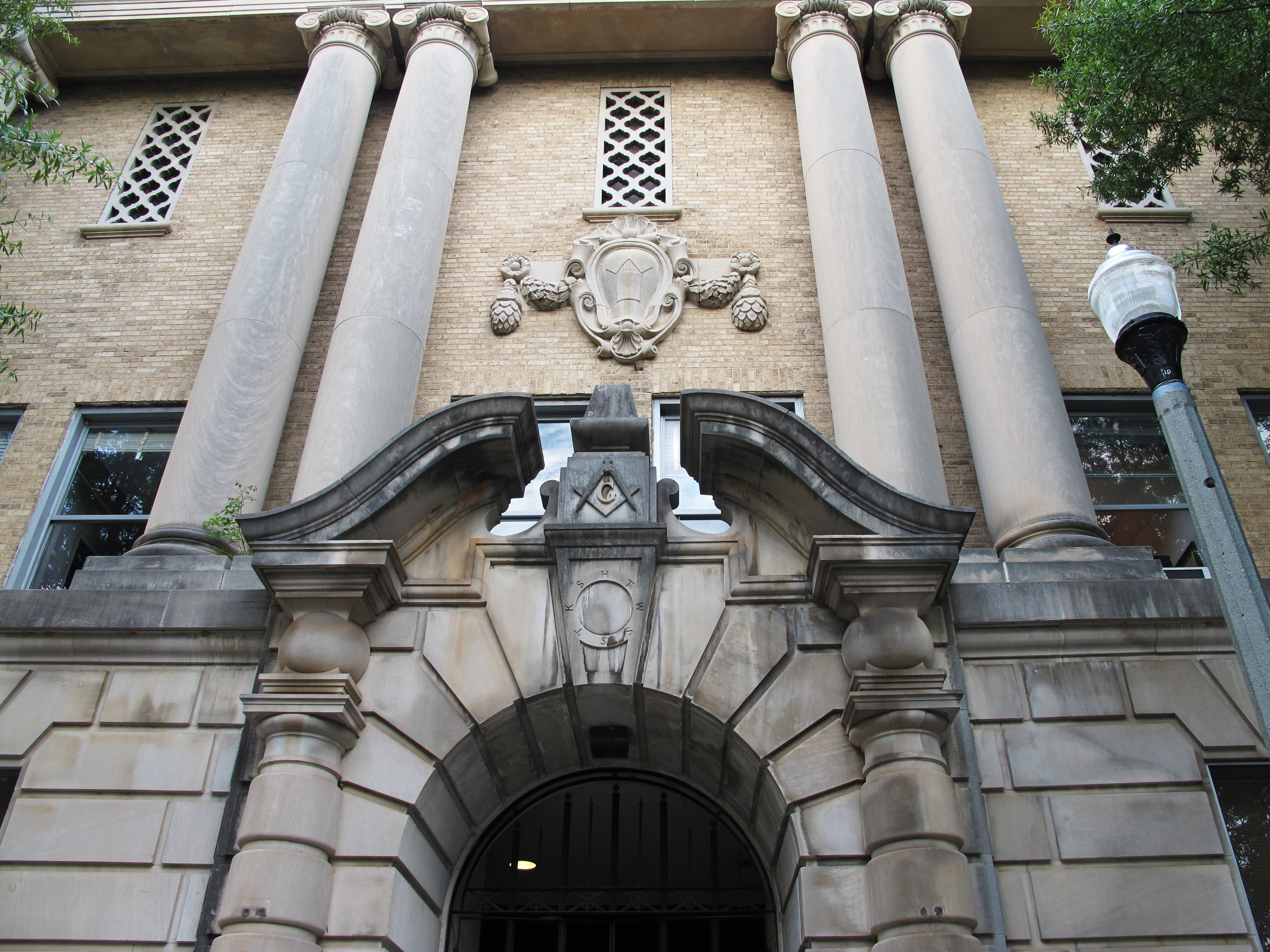

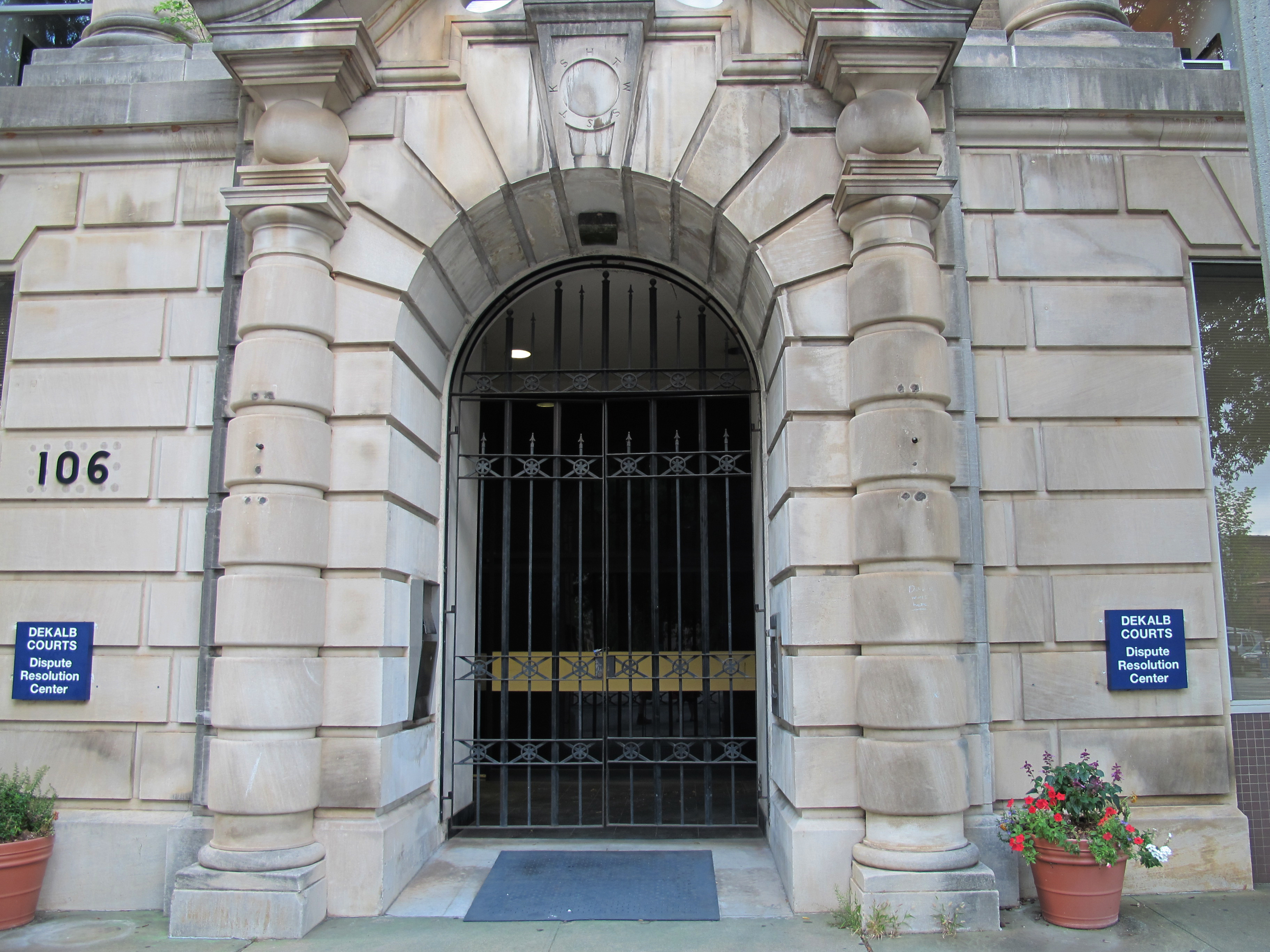
