= Fannin County Courthouse (Georgia) =

- U.S. National Register of Historic Places
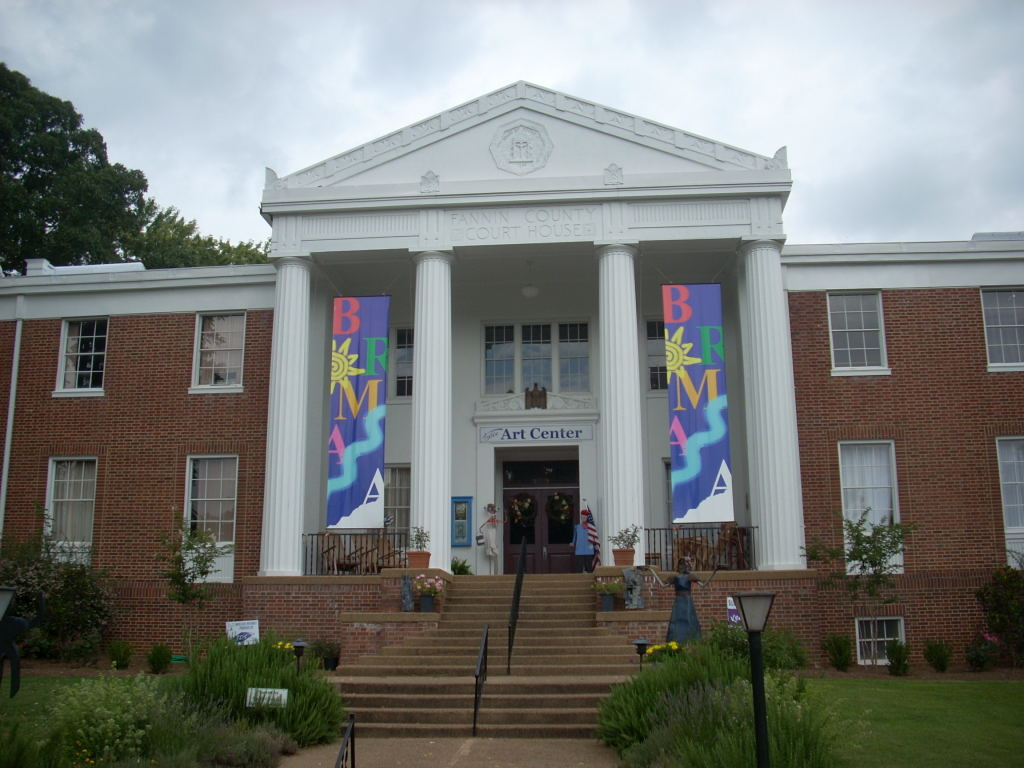
- Old Fannin County Courthouse

- Location within Georgia Location within the United States
- Location: Blue Ridge, Georgia, United States
- Coordinates: 34°51′49″N 84°19′38″W
- Built: 1937
- Architect: Edwards, Sayward & Robert B. Logan Associates; builder W. P. Marshall
- Architectural style: Neoclassical
- MPS: Georgia County Courthouses TR
- NRHP reference No.: 95000716
- Added to NRHP: June 8, 1995

The Fannin County Courthouse, built in 1937, is an historic courthouse building located in Blue Ridge, Georgia, United States. It was designed by Atlanta-based architect William Augustus Edwards who designed one other courthouse in Georgia, two in Florida and nine in South Carolina well as academic buildings at 12 institutions in Florida, Georgia and South Carolina. On June 8, 1995, it was added to the National Register of Historic Places.

In 2004 it was replaced by a new courthouse built next door. It is now leased as Georgia Mountain Center for the Arts.

== See also ==
- National Register of Historic Places listings in Fannin County, Georgia
