= Gator Guard Drill Team =

University of Florida military fraternity

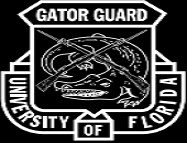
- Active: 1953 – present
- Country: United States
- Type: Drill Team/Color Guard
- Headquarters: Van Fleet Hall (Gainesville, Florida)
- Nickname: Gator Guard
- Website: Gator Guard website

The Gator Guard Drill Team, abbreviated GGDT, is a precision drill team and military fraternity based at the University of Florida (UF). The team is named after the Florida Gator, the mascot of the UF. Founded in 1953, the Gator Guard is most widely known for its annual performances in the Mardi Gras Parades. In 2016, the team consisted of 31 active male and female members.

== History ==
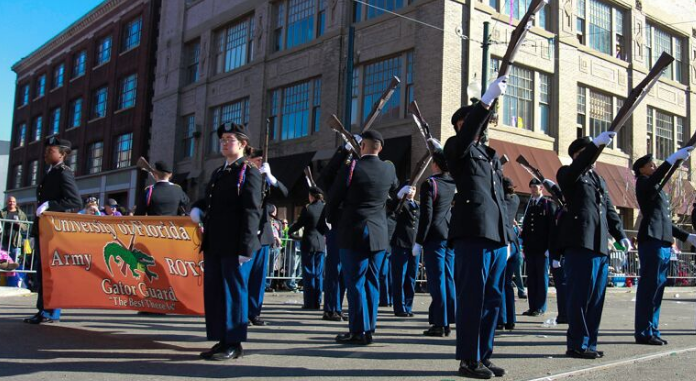
Gator guard performing at Mardi Gras parades, 2016.

The Gator Guard Drill Team was founded in 1953 at the University of Florida in Gainesville, Florida. by cadets from the University of Florida ROTC program. The Gator Guard absorbed and succeeded the University of Florida's chapter of the Pershing Rifles. The Gator Guard was modeled after the 3rd United States Infantry Regiment, "The Old Guard." The Gator Guard's founding class consisted of sixteen cadets.

In many universities across the United States, ROTC participation was compulsory. This policy would be revoked in the 1960s, following opposition to U.S. involvement in the Vietnam War, in favor of voluntary programs. This move from compulsory to voluntary participation in the UF ROTC program would cause a substantial decrease in enrollment of members, both in the ROTC program and in the Gator Guard Drill Team. This is largely why the team's enrollment peaked in 1957, with 72 members.

From 1963 to 1972, the Gator Guard had a nine year winning streak as the "Best Drill Unit" in the All-Florida Invitational Drill Meet, held in Sarasota, Florida.

In the 1970s, women would gain opportunities for entrance into ROTC programs, as the Army opened up positions in Field Artillery and the ordinance corps to female officers. The Gator Guard, having been an exclusively male team, also began admitting women. The first female cadet to march with the drill team was Carmen Parrot in the 1973–74 school year. She was allowed to carry the Guidon during parades. The first female commander of the drill team was Nancy A. Oxer in 1979.

== Symbols ==
The Gator Guard is named for the University of Florida's mascot, the Florida Gators. Its members wear orange and blue citation cords.

== Membership ==
Members of the Gator Guard must maintain high academic standards. In 2016, the team consisted of 31 active male and female members.

== Activities ==
The Drill Team uses M1903 rifles with eight-inch bayonets for all performances. The Gator Guard performs annually at the University of Florida's Homecoming Parade, as well as the Krewe of Mid-City and King Rex parades at the New Orleans Mardi Gras.
