= Russell Pancoast =

American architect

- Born: Russell Thorn Pancoast; February 13, 1899; Merchantville, New Jersey
- Died: November 28, 1972 (aged 73); Miami Beach, Florida
- Education: Cornell University, 1922 BArch
- Occupation: Architect
- Spouse: Katherine Bennett French (m. 1923)
- Children: Martha French, Lester Collins
- Parent(s): Thomas J. and Katharine Rogers (Collins) Pancoast
- Awards: House & Home Award of Merit; Florida AIA Design Honor Award; H.J. Klutho Lifetime achievement Award
- Practice: Russell T. Pancoast & Associates, Miami, Florida
- Buildings: The Hub, Bass Museum
- Projects: Plantation, Florida, Spessard L. Holland Law Center,

Russell Pancoast (February 13, 1899 – November 28, 1972) was an American architect and city planner who designed hundreds of buildings throughout Florida and the city master plan for Plantation, Florida. He and his father, Thomas J. Pancoast drew the city master plan for Miami Beach, Florida.

== Personal life and education ==
Born in 1899 and raised in Camden, New Jersey, Pancoast was second of three boys of Katharine and Thomas J. Pancoast, a hardware merchant. His family was Quaker and he graduated from the George School in 1918, then his family moved to Miami Beach, where his father joined his wife's father developing real estate.

Pancoast attended the University of Pennsylvania School of Design, followed by Cornell University where he was a member of the New York Alpha chapter of Phi Kappa Psi fraternity and received a Bachelor of Architecture degree in 1922. After finishing his education, he married Katherine French in 1923. The couple had two children, Martha French in 1927 and Lester Collins in 1931.

== Career ==
John S. Collins, Pancoast's maternal grandfather, was a Miami Beach developer during the Florida land boom of the 1920s. When Pancoast and his extended family moved to Miami Beach, he worked at the firm Kiehnel and Elliott before opening his own architectural design practice with Cornell fraternity brother Edward Sibbert in 1927. Pancoast and Sibbert was short lived however; following the 1926 Miami hurricane Sibbert and his wife packed up and left Florida, returning to Brooklyn.

In addition to his significant buildings, Pancoast also designed scores of architecturally significant residences. Some realtors in south Florida specialize in homes designed by notable architects of the era. His buildings range in style from Mediterranean Revival to Postwar Modern. He helped shape the use of Art Deco in Miami Beach.

== Projects ==
His first major project was for industrialist Harvey S. Firestone, who wanted a place where he and his friends could socialize away from the public spotlight during Prohibition. Pancoast was becoming known as an architect who defined the era's aesthetics. The Surf Club opened in 1930 on New Year's Eve and became the place in Surfside, Florida where aristocrats, celebrities and statesmen gathered for fashion shows, boxing, parties and gala dinners.

Following his grandfather's donation of land that eventually became Collins Park, Pancoast designed a library and center of culture with an exterior covered in tiles of Florida keystone. The building was converted in 1964 into Miami-Dade's first permanent museum, the Bass Museum of Art. During the early 1930s, he worked with his father on city planning for Miami Beach.

Other structures Pancoast designed include the Mead Building in the art deco style on Lincoln Road which originally housed upscale stores such as Bonwit Teller; the Miami Beach Woman's Club in 1933 using the Miami Mediterranean style; the Peter Miller Hotel, constructed in 1936 as an intimate, boutique hotel with fewer than 100 rooms. The Lennox Hotel group renovated the building in 2019 at a cost of $71 million.

From 1944 to 1945 he was engaged by Frederick C. Peters, founder of Plantation, Florida to work on a city plan for the future Broward County community. The city was incorporated April 23, 1953. An article in the Miami Herald on August 1, 1954, covered the new city's plan, describing Plantation as "The City of the Future". Pancoast served as a special advisor to the Plantation zoning commission from 1953 to 1969.

In the early 1950s, Pancoast worked on the plans for the Inter-American Cultural and Trade Center (Interama) with Robert Fitch Smith. He designed The Hub at the University of Florida with Guy Fulton that was constructed in 1950. That building, initially called the Student Services Center, contained the post office, bookstore, movie theater, soda fountain and barber shop. At Florida State University, Pancoast was architect for the Oglesby Student Union. Pancoast was architect for the 1957 Fillmore Miami Beach, the concert venue/auditorium that is part of the Miami Beach Convention Center. It was the broadcast location of The Jackie Gleason Show, The Ed Sullivan Show and The Dick Clark Show from the 1950s thru the 1960s. The Miss Universe and Miss USA pageants during the 1960s originated at the Fillmore.

Pancoast and his associates designed the Spessard Holland Law Center at the University of Florida which opened in 1969. The project was honored by the American Institute of Architects (Florida Chapter) with the 1966 honor design award. The college was renamed the Levin College of Law in 1999.

== Professional activities ==
Pancoast served as a chair of the Board of Architecture and Interior Design for the Florida Department of Business and Professional Regulation which certifies and licenses architects and interior design professionals.

He was also a member of the American Institute of Architects (AIA) beginning in 1929. He served a term as president and secretary of the South Florida chapter and was elected an AIA Fellow in 1951. He was posthumously awarded AIA's Silver Medallion in 1972.

Pancoast was a visiting lecturer at the University of Florida in Gainesville for the College of Architecture & Fine Arts.

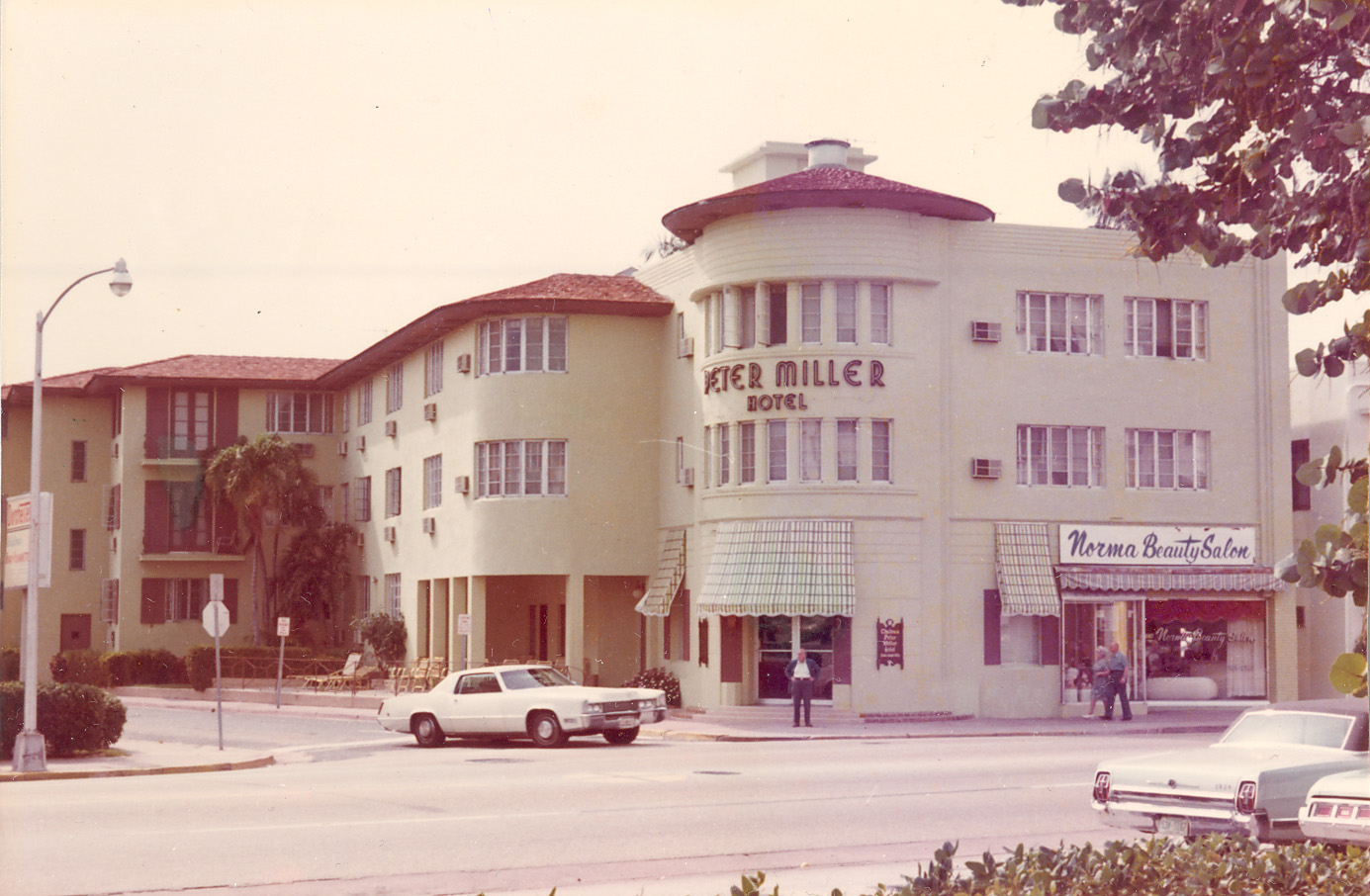
Peter Miller Hotel in 1973

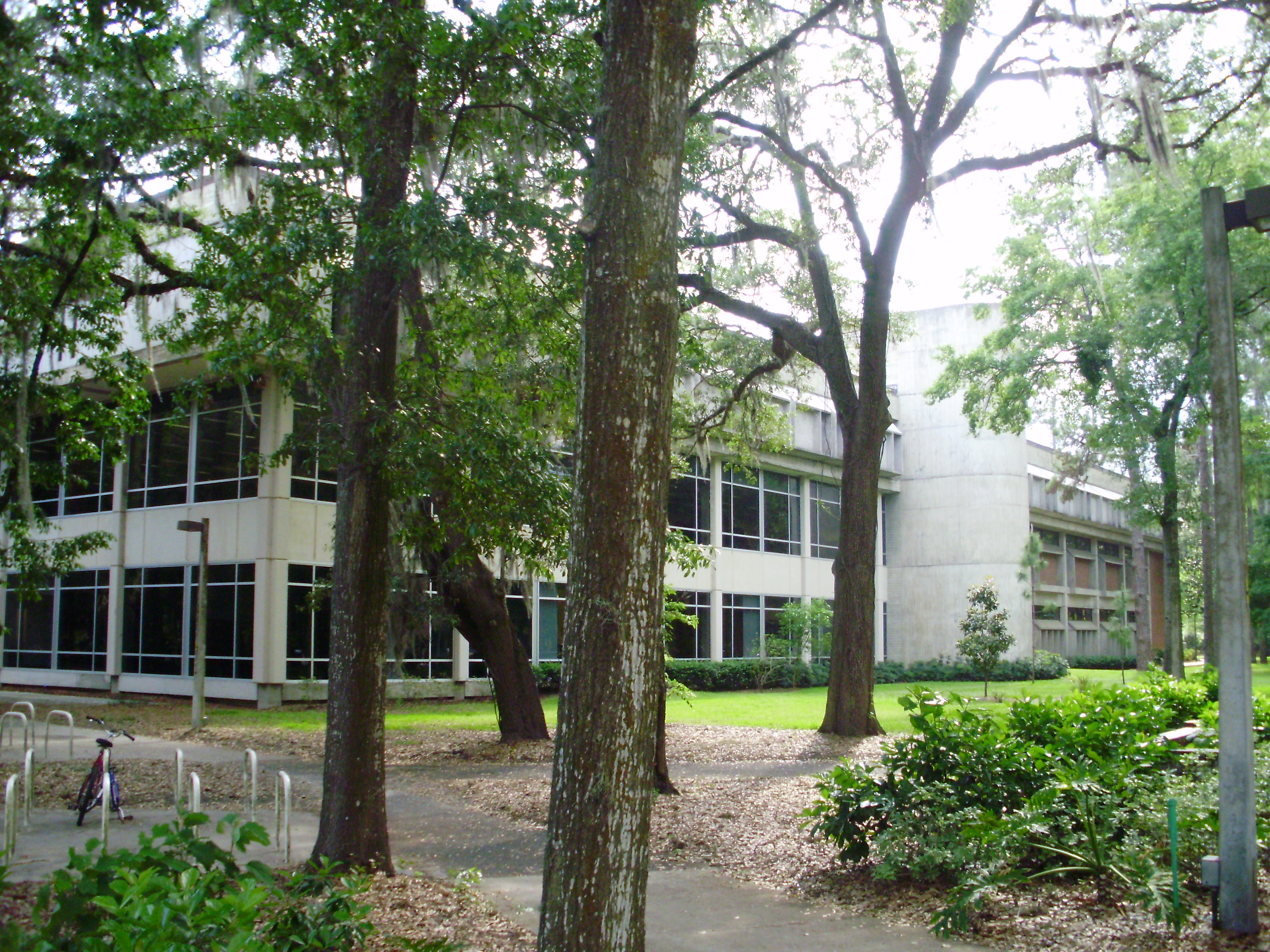
Hollard Law Center at University of Florida

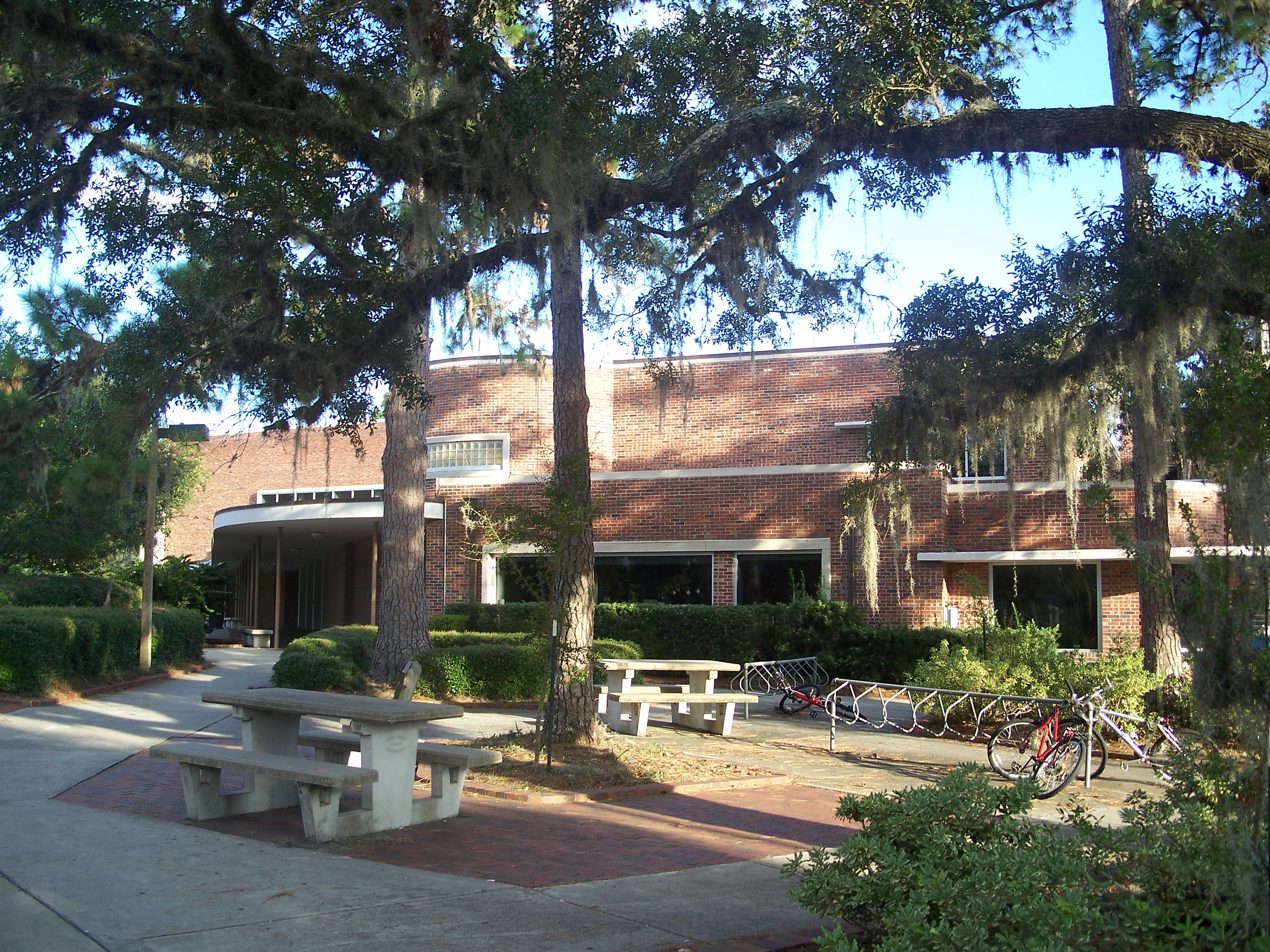
The Hub at University of Florida

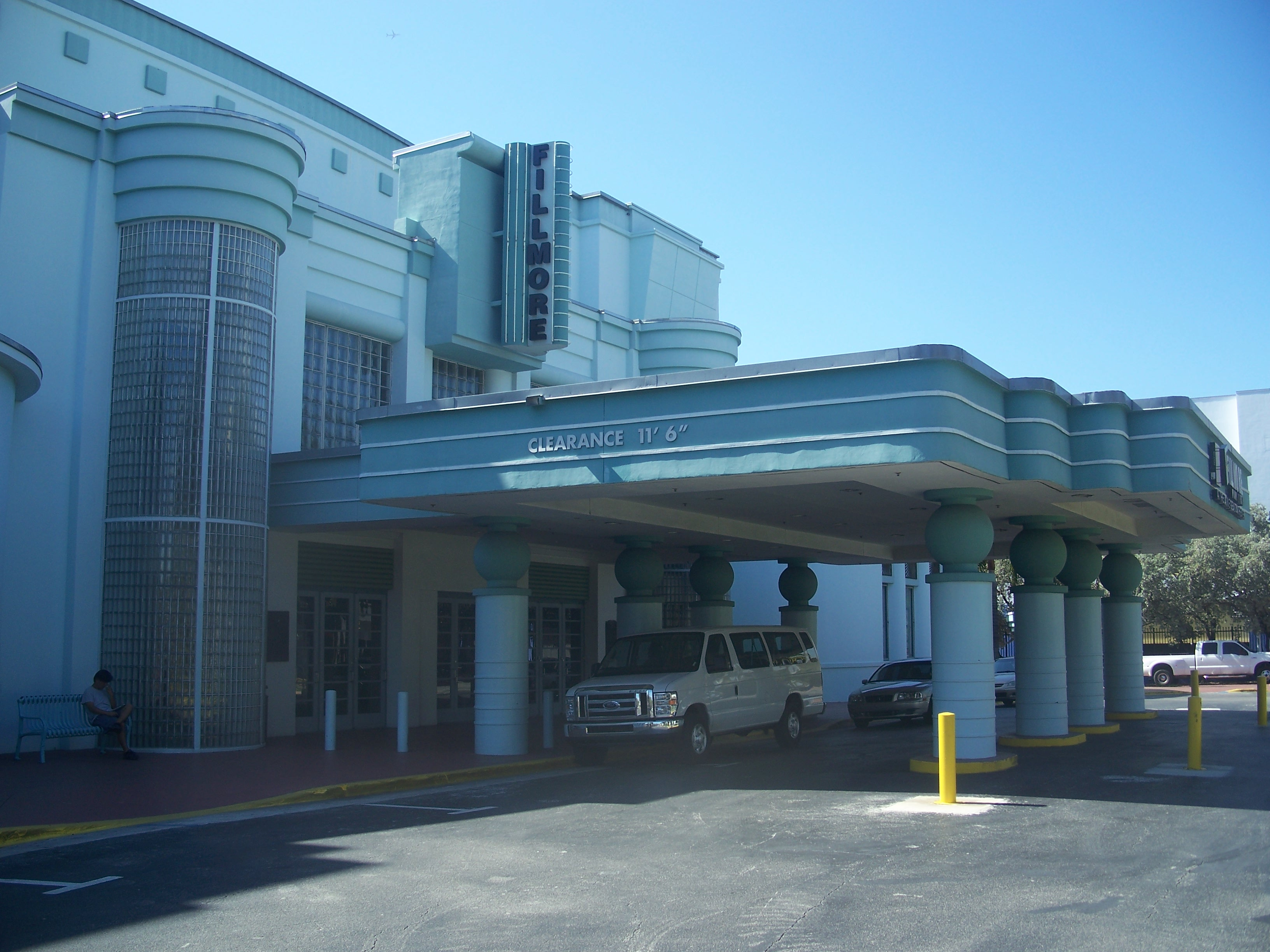
Fillmore Miami Beach

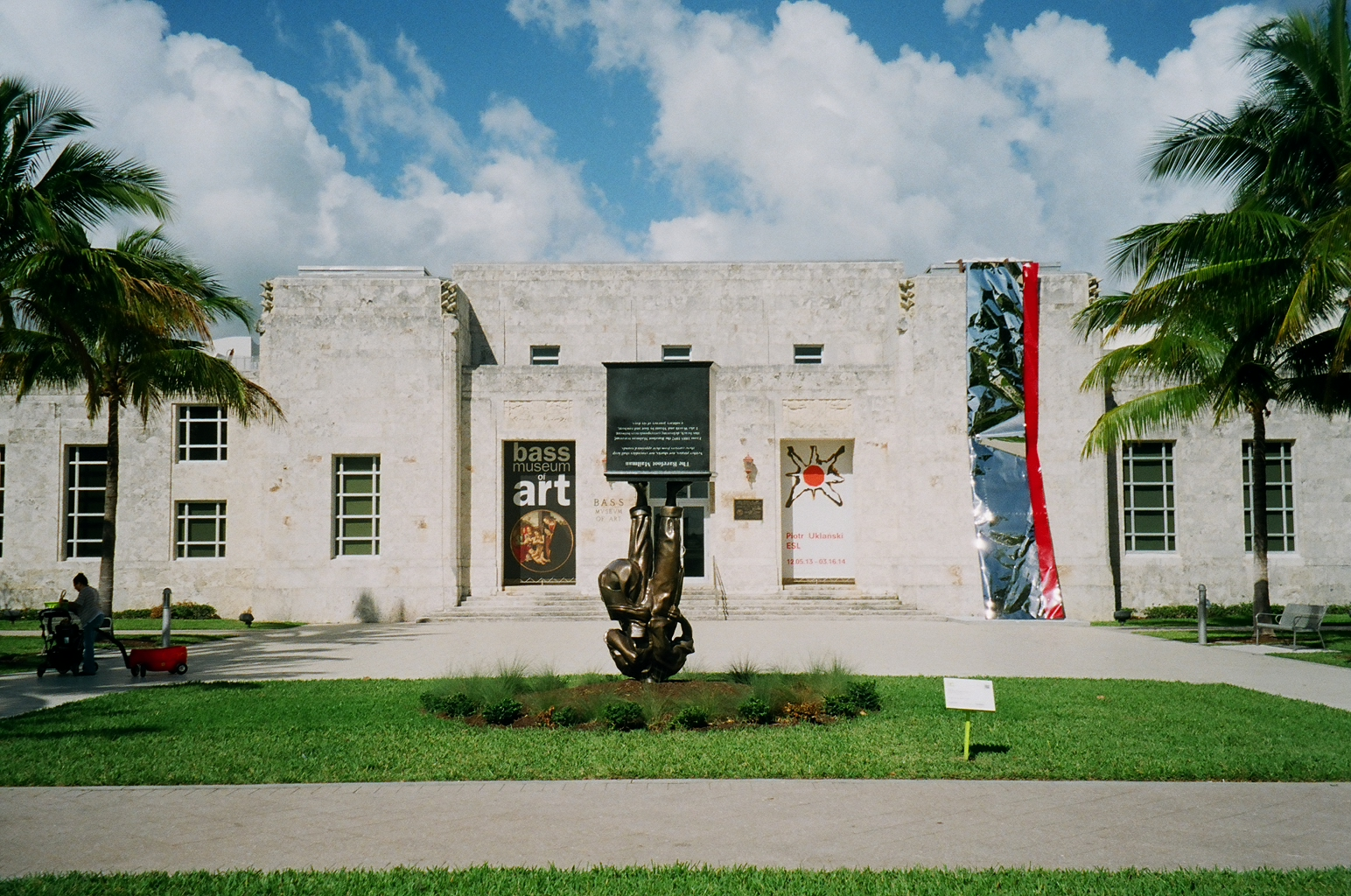
Bass Museum South Beach
