= The Hub (Gainesville, Florida) =

Historic building in the United States

- U.S. National Register of Historic Places
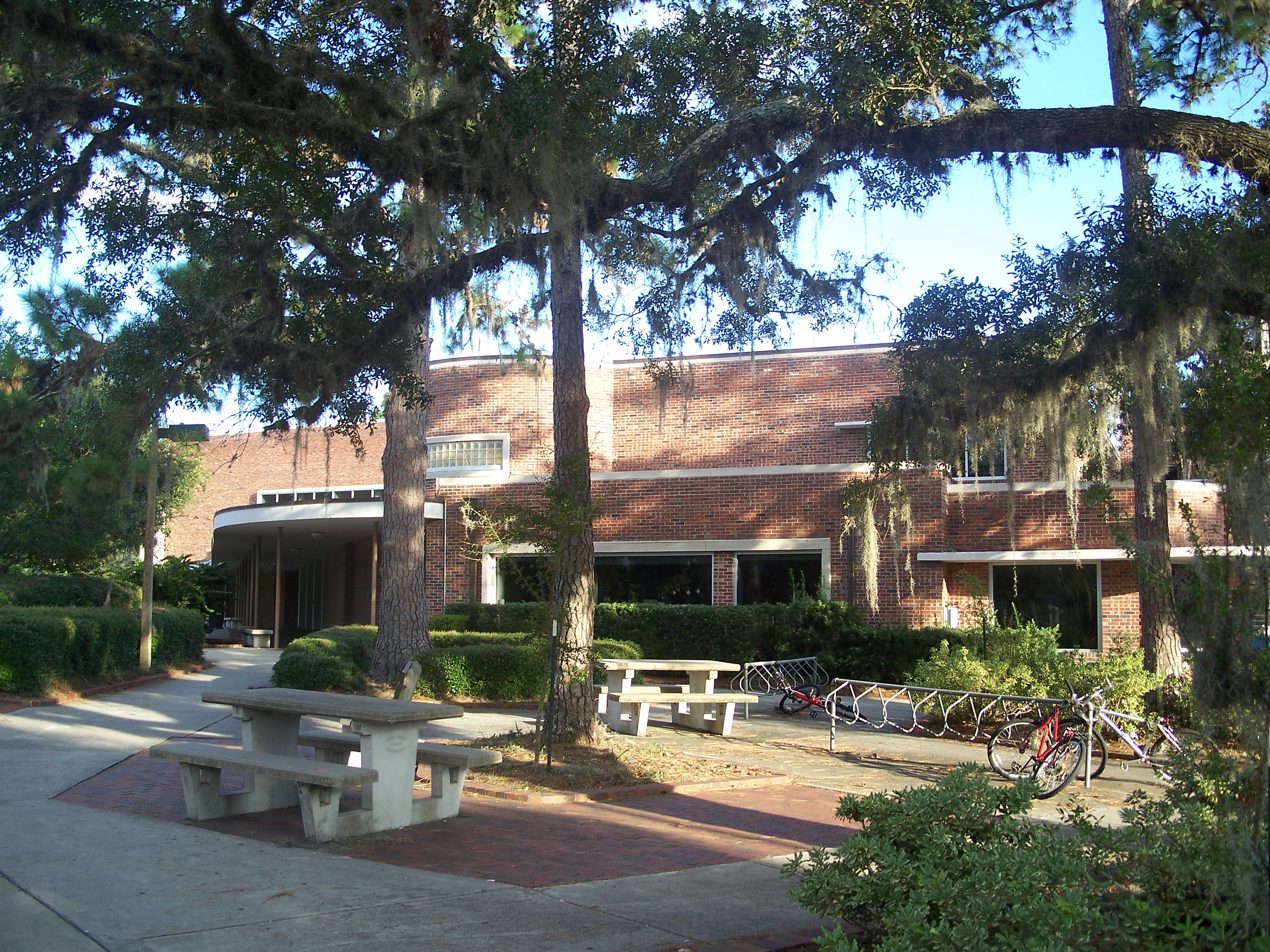

- Location within Florida Location within the United States
- Location: Gainesville, Florida, USA
- Coordinates: 29°38′55″N 82°20′45″W
- Built: 1949-50
- Architect: Andrew Ferendino, lead architect for Russell Pancoast and Associates of Miami; Jefferson M. Hamilton, Guy Fulton
- Architectural style: Mid-Century modern
- MPS: University of Florida Campus MPS
- NRHP reference No.: 08000551
- Added to NRHP: June 24, 2008

The Hub is a historic building on the University of Florida campus in Gainesville, Florida in the United States. It is located on Stadium Road between Buckman Drive and Fletcher Drive.

On June 24, 2008, it was added to the National Register of Historic Places.

== History ==
=== Early history ===
The Hub was built in 1949-1950 after being designed by Andrew Ferendino of the Miami architectural firm of Russell Pancoast and Associates, as directed by Florida Board of Control architect Guy Fulton and UF's consulting architect Jefferson Hamilton. It was UF's first departure from the Collegiate Gothic architectural style that had prevailed on the campus since the first buildings, Buckman and Thomas, were built in 1905.

During its design phase, the Hub was briefly known as the Student Services Center. Around the time of its grand opening, it was renamed the Hub by students after a campus-wide contest.

=== Change in services ===
The Hub originally housed the campus bookstore, post office, barber shop, soda fountain, and movie theater.

Prior to moving to the J. Wayne Reitz Union in 2003, the university's bookstore and ID card services were both located at the Hub. A small food court was set up on the first floor and the "Technology Hub" selling computer accessories and software was on the second floor.

=== Renovations ===
In 2005, the Hub began undergoing a $10.8 million renovation and was later reopened in April 2007. The renovation added various computer and videoconferencing equipment, a 10,000-square-foot (930 m^{2}) open wireless Internet area, a Starbucks, a Chick-fil-A, and group and individual study rooms. The Office of Academic Technology and the International Center (study abroad) moved to the Hub following the renovation.

== See also ==
- University of Florida
- Buildings at the University of Florida
