= Matherly Hall =

- U.S. Historic district – Contributing property
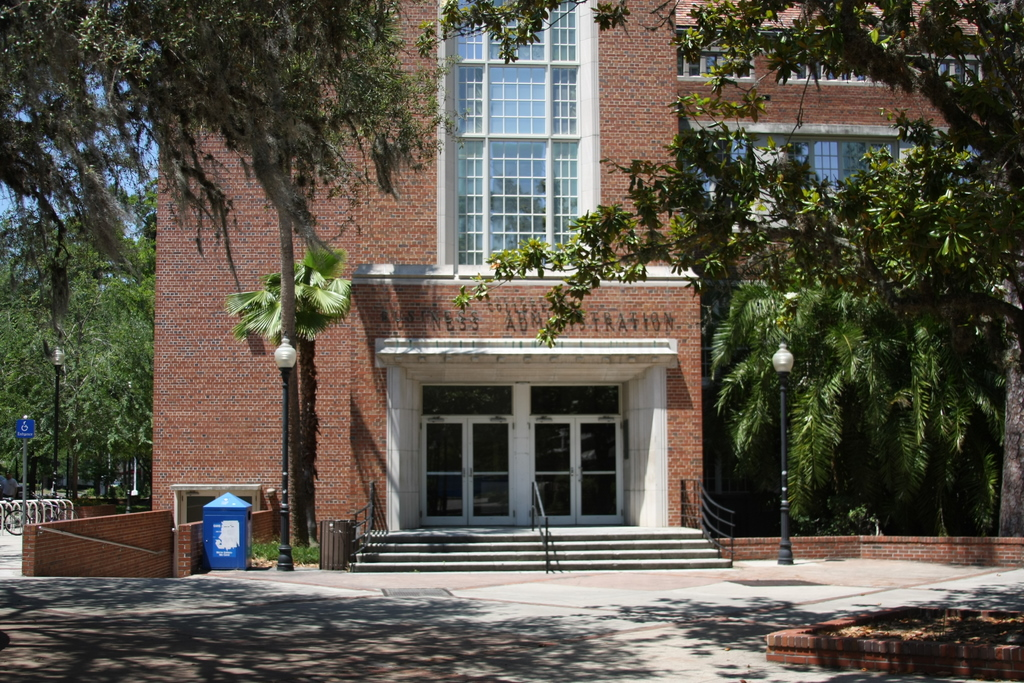

- Location within Florida Location within the United States
- Location: Gainesville, Florida
- Coordinates: 29°39′6″N 82°20′27″W
- Built: early 1950s
- Architect: Guy Fulton
- Architectural style: Modified Collegiate Gothic

Matherly Hall built in the early 1950s is an historic classroom and faculty office building on the campus of the University of Florida in Gainesville, Florida, in the United States. It was designed by Guy Fulton in a modified Collegiate Gothic style to house the College of Business Administration. It is named for Walter Jeffries Matherly, dean of the business college from 1926 to 1954.

In 2008 Matherly Hall became a contributing property in the University of Florida Campus Historic District which was added to the National Register of Historic Places on April 20, 1989.

== See also ==
- Buildings at the University of Florida
- History of the University of Florida
