= Riker Hall =

Harold C. Riker Hall
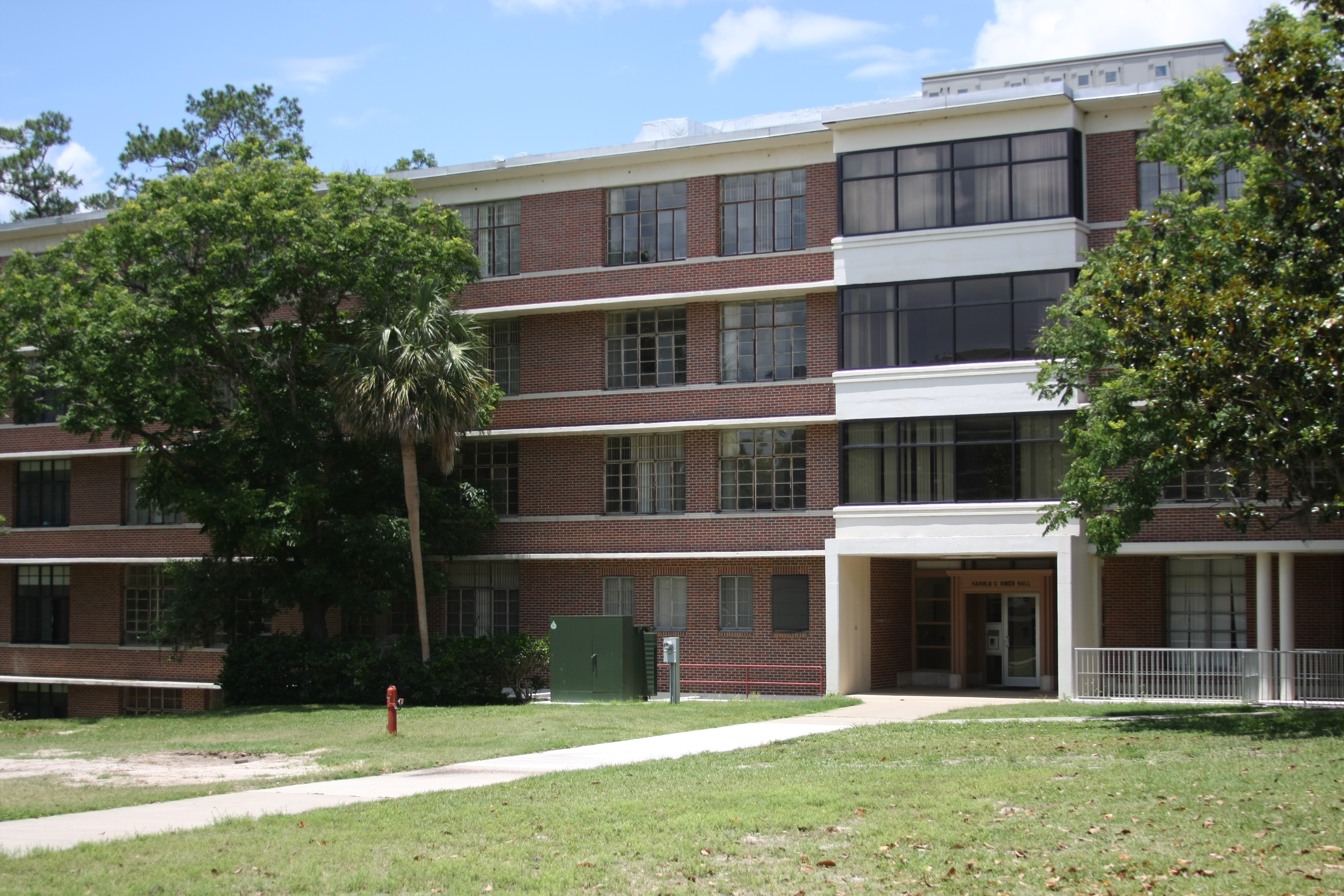

General information
- Type: Housing
- Location: Main campus, University of Florida, Gainesville, Florida, United States
- Coordinates: 29.6474767°N 82.3511863°W
- Completed: 1950

Design and construction
- Architect(s): Guy Fulton

Website
- Dorm Info

Riker Hall built in 1950 is a historic building on the campus of the University of Florida in Gainesville, Florida, in the United States. It was designed by Guy Fulton in a modified Collegiate Gothic style to provide housing for the student body. Known as South Hall for the first five decades of existence, it was named for Harold C. Riker in 2000.
