= Weil Hall =

- Engineering Industries Building
- U.S. National Register of Historic Places
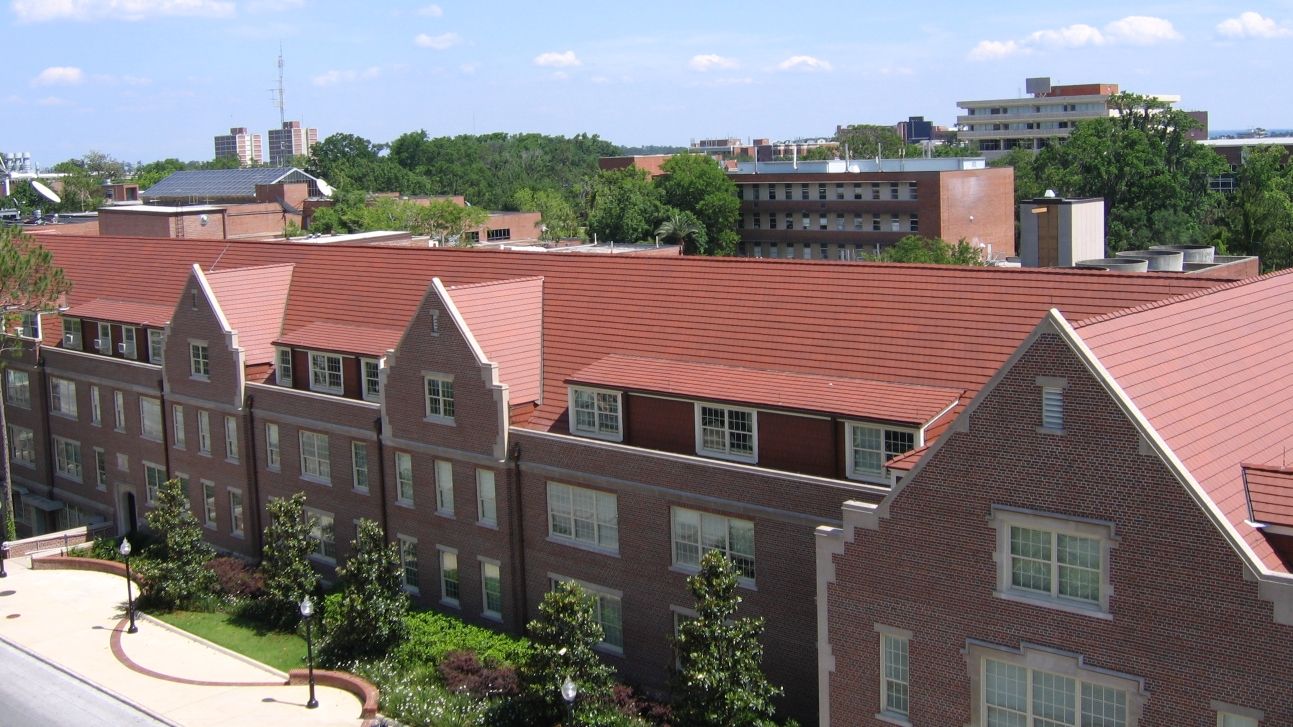

- Location within Florida Location within the United States
- Location: Gainesville, Florida, USA
- Coordinates: 29°38′54″N 82°20′53″W
- Built: 1947-1949
- Architect: Guy Fulton
- Architectural style: Collegiate Gothic
- MPS: University of Florida Campus MPS
- NRHP reference No.: 08000547
- Added to NRHP: June 24, 2008

Weil Hall (formerly the Engineering Industries Building) is a historic building at Stadium Road and Gale Lemerand Drive (North-South Drive) on the University of Florida campus in Gainesville, Florida, United States. On June 24, 2008, it was added to the U.S. National Register of Historic Places.

Built in sections between 1947 and 1949, it was designed by the Florida Board of Control's third architect Guy Fulton in the Collegiate Gothic architectural style begun by William Augustus Edwards the first BOC architect in 1905 and continued by his successor Rudolph Weaver, the second BOC architect. It was to be, however, one of the last buildings on campus to remain true to that style. It was named for Joseph Weil, dean of the College of Engineering.

Weil Hall houses the College of engineering deans and also various departments. Civil Engineering and Industrial Engineering are the two predominant colleges that occupy the building. Every year the college's students host an event called "Pig Fest" were the two department's students celebrate the school year's end and compete in various games for dominance and kingdom of Weil Hall.

== See also ==
- University of Florida
- Buildings at the University of Florida
- University of Florida College of Engineering
