= North Hall (Gainesville, Florida) =

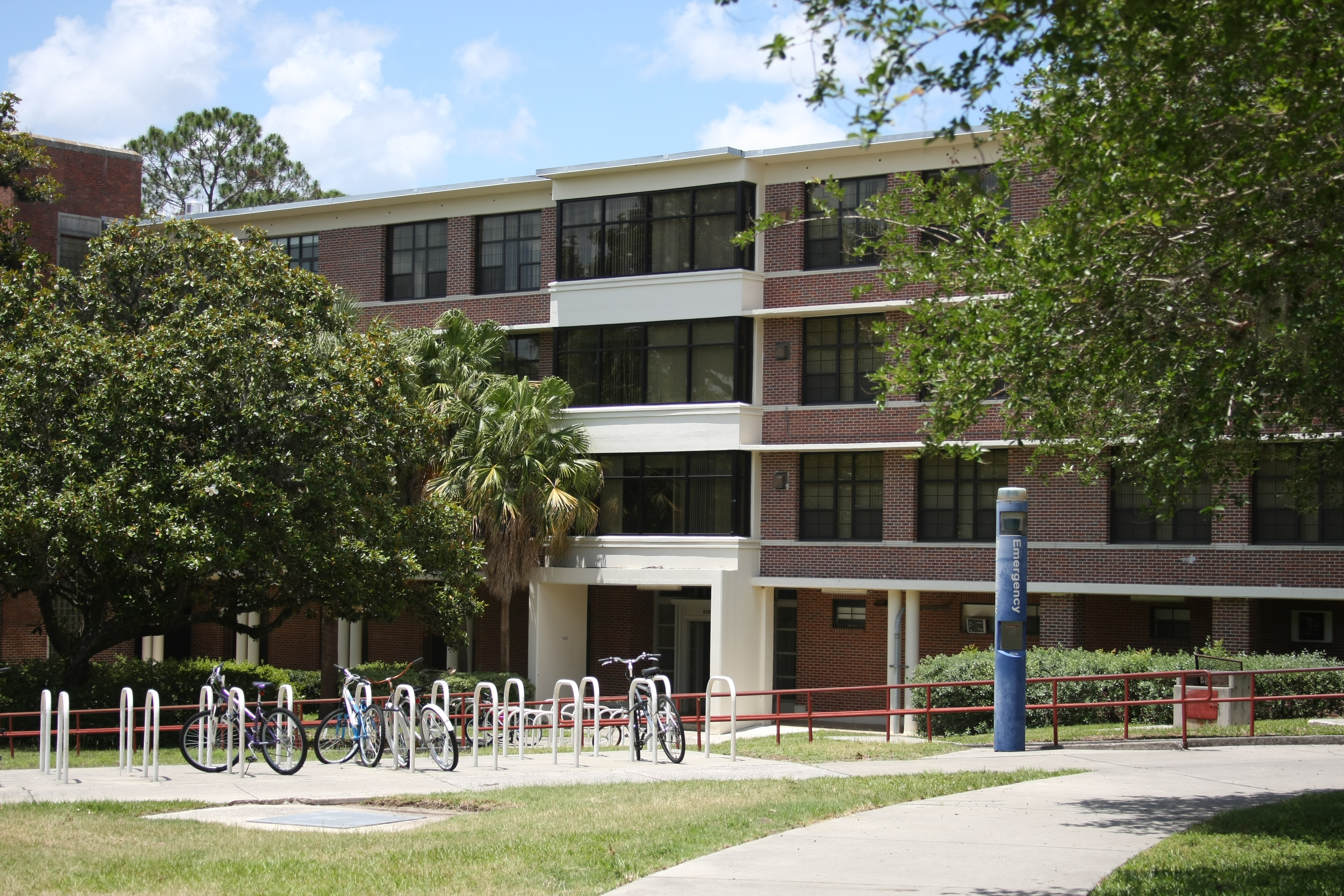
- Interactive map of the North Hall area

General information
- Type: Housing
- Location: Main campus, University of Florida, Gainesville, Florida, United States
- Coordinates: 29.6479022°N 82.3507625°W
- Completed: 1950

Design and construction
- Architect: Guy Fulton

Website
- Dorm Info

North Hall built in 1950 is a historic building on the campus of the University of Florida in Gainesville, Florida, in the United States. It was designed by Guy Fulton in a modified Collegiate Gothic style to provide housing for the student body.

== See also ==
- University of Florida
- Buildings at the University of Florida
- University of Florida student housing
