= University of Florida ROTC =

University of Florida Reserve Officer Training Corps
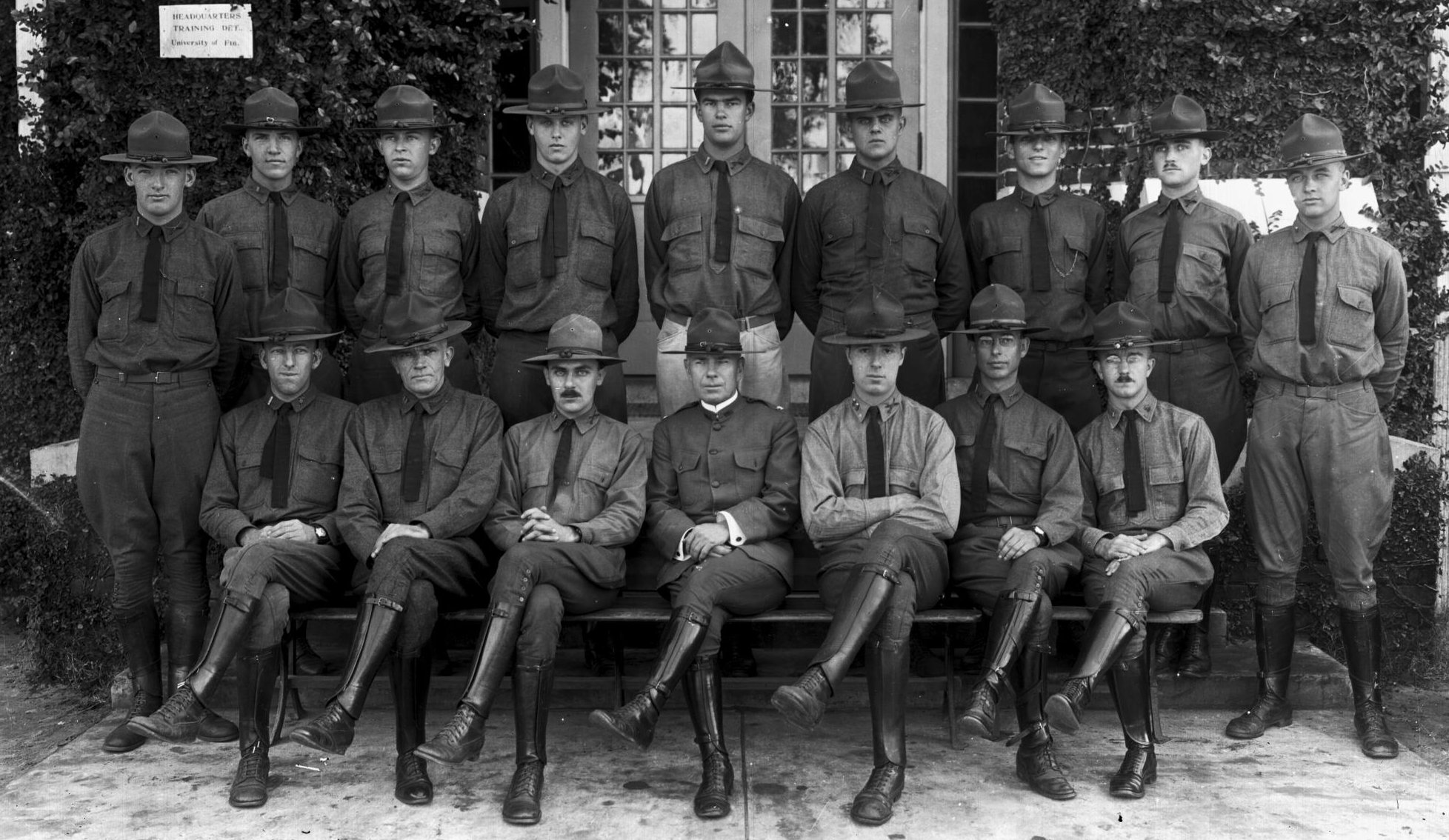
- Active: 1905–Present
- Country: United States
- Branch: Army, Navy, Marines, and Air Force
- Type: Reserve Officers' Training Corps
- Part of: Division of Military Science

University of Florida ROTC (Reserve Officer Training Corps) is the official officer training and commissioning program at the University of Florida in Gainesville, Florida. The ROTC Program offers commissions for the U.S. Army, U.S. Navy, U.S. Marines, and the U.S. Air Force. The unit is one of the oldest in the nation and is currently located in Van Fleet Hall on the university's campus. The university's Air Force ROTC won the Right of Line Trophy in 2007 and 2009 ranking it as the top program of its size in the nation. The unit has also been home to the prestigious Gator Guard Drill Team since 1953.

== Overview ==
The Reserve Officer Training Corps at the University of Florida offers training in the military sciences to students who desire to perform military service after they graduate. The Departments of the Army, Air Force and Navy each maintain a Reserve Officers Training Corps and each department has a full staff of military personnel.

== Location and namesake ==
The unit is headquartered in Van Fleet Hall, which is a three-story brick building located adjacent to the Stephen C. O'Connell Center. Van Fleet Hall contains classrooms, lounges, offices, and a reading area. The facility is named for General James Van Fleet, who served in World War I and World War II, and was the commander of United States and United Nations forces during the Korean War. Van Fleet was a professor of military tactics at the University of Florida and the head coach of the Florida Gators football team during the 1920s.

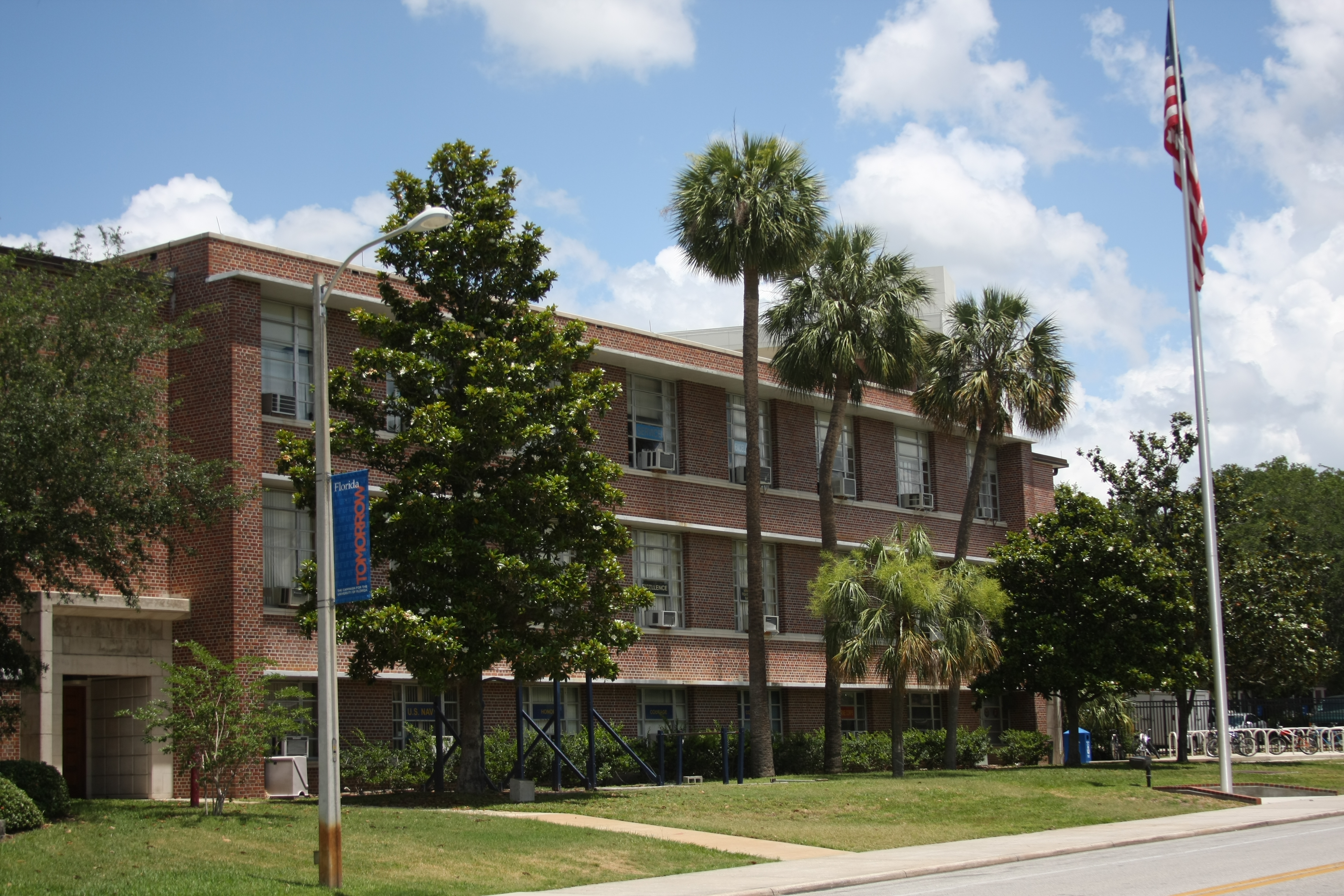
Van Fleet Hall

== See also ==
- History of the University of Florida
