= Glen Springs =

Hydrological spring in Gainesville, Florida, United States

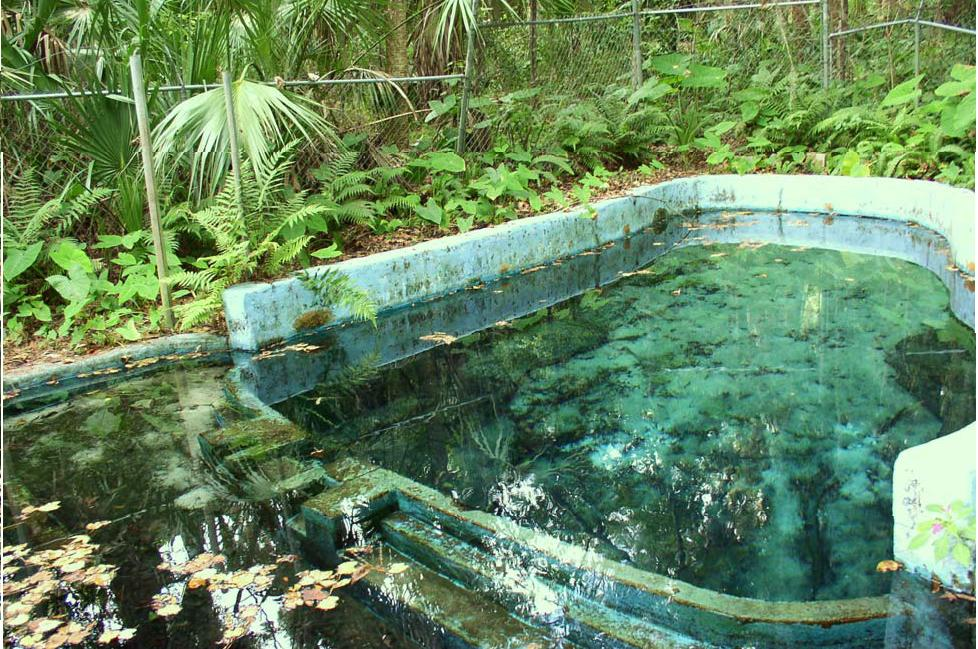
- head spring

- Location within Florida
- Type: Former Recreation Area
- Location: Gainesville, Florida
- Coordinates: 29.674167°N 82.347222°W
- Area: 3.79 acres (1.53 ha)
- Created: 1924-1926; 1940
- Designer: Guy Fulton
- Owner: Elks Club of Gainesville
- Open: yearly fishing derby
- Status: closed

Glen Springs is a 5th magnitude hydrological spring in Gainesville, Florida, United States, located at 2424 NW 23rd Boulevard. Formerly a popular swimming and recreation area, the property closed to the public in 1970 and is no longer maintained for swimming.

== History ==
Since Gainesville was settled in 1854, locals have known about and flocked to the ravine with a beautiful spring and trees surrounding it. Outflow from the spring becomes the 500-foot (150 m) Glen Spring Run, which joins Hogtown Creek. Measurements between 1941 and 1972 reported flows which varied between 26,000 and 36,000 US gallons per day (98 and 136 m^{3}/d), according to Florida Geological Survey Bulletin 66. The most recent test in 2010 showed daily flow at just 6,000 U.S. gallons per day (23 m^{3}/d).

=== Pound ===
The surrounding property and spring were purchased by Gainesville businessman Cicero Addison Pound Sr. in 1924. Architect Guy Fulton designed the first pool and springhouse which was built soon after. The swimming team from the University of Florida even practiced there around 1929 before the university pool was constructed in 1930. At that time, Northwest 23rd Boulevard was known as Glen Springs Road. Pound's son stated that Glen Springs was the “only (public) place to swim near Gainesville” until the pool at Westside Park was completed in 1966. Glen Springs was, however, a segregated swimming area, open only to whites.

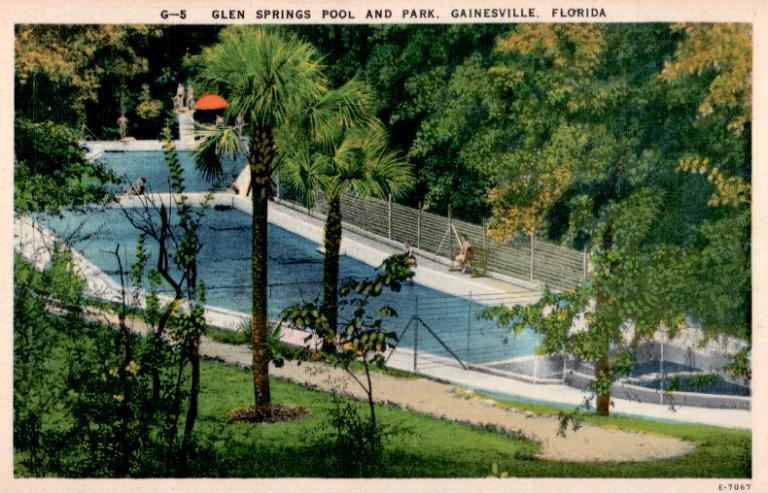
Spring & pool in the late 1940s

Fulton's design expanded the facility to three pools in 1940. The first pool contained the spring itself and was 18 by 10 feet (5.5 m × 3.0 m) and mostly 8 feet (2.4 m) deep; the middle pool was 170 by 25 feet (51.8 m × 7.6 m) and 3 feet (0.91 m) deep; the last pool was 140 by 25 feet (42.7 m × 7.6 m) and 8 feet (2.4 m) deep. Total volume was more than 300,000 US gallons (1,100,000 L). It included 3 feet 3 inches and 9 feet 10 inches (1 and 3 m) springboards. The pool's drain is on the bottom beneath the 9.8 feet (3 m) concrete platform, where water flows through a discharge pipe and creates the Glen Springs Run.

The springhouse included two levels: the ground floor contained locker rooms and showers, while the upper level held a hardwood dance floor, jukebox and concession stand. Roy Perkins, who ran the facility for twenty years, called it "the largest baby-sitting agency in Gainesville." The pool was cleaned weekly by diverting the water to a bypass canal, which allowed the pools to drain, then lifeguards would scrub the walls and bottom with brooms. Flow was returned to the pool and it refilled.

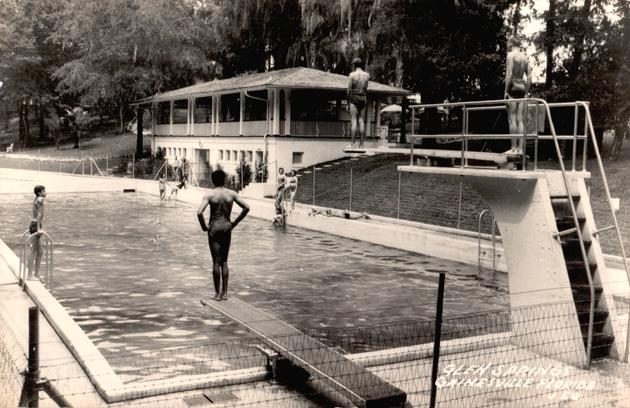
Diving boards & springhouse in 1959

In addition to picnics and dancing, the facility was used for kids birthday parties, boy and girl scout activities, business promotions, swimming lessons and special events, such as a traveling carnival and a mermaid show. The facility could also be reserved for private parties after closing at 8:00pm each night until midnight. Musician Tom Petty, who grew up in Gainesville, included a verse about the spring in his song, "Dreamville":

Ridin' with my mama
To Glen spring's pool
The water was cold
My lips were blue

=== Elks ===
In 1970, the city prohibited chlorinated water from being discharged into the creek system, and there were other pools available in Gainesville, so the pool closed. The Elks Lodge #990 purchased the property and swimming was not permitted.

The Elks constructed a deck attached to the upper floor of the springhouse, but no maintenance was performed on the pool's physical structure, which has deteriorated over forty plus years. The Elks Club stocked the pools with bluegills and catfish, and hold an annual fishing derby there.

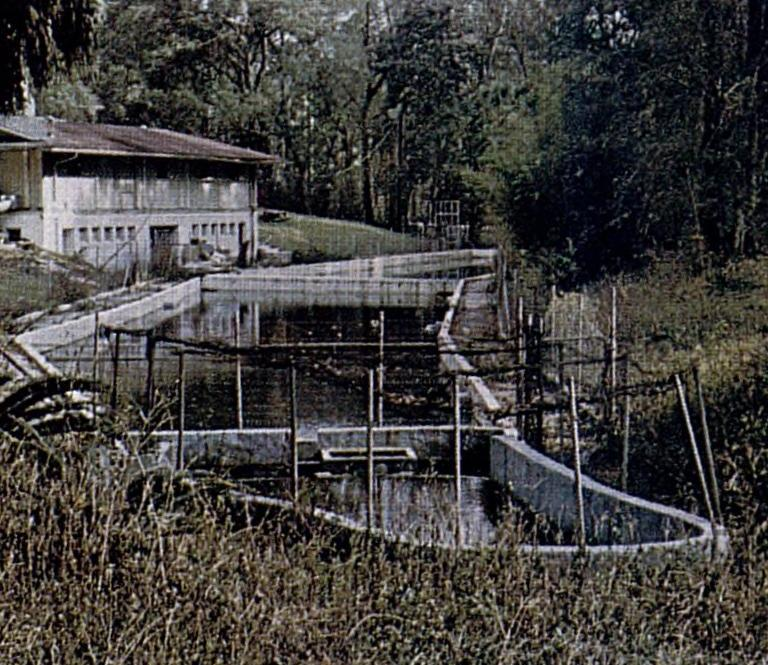
Spring & pool in 1977

UF professor A.O. White led an effort in 1984 for the city to acquire the spring and restore it to a natural state. In April, 1986, negotiations between the Elks and the city were terminated when the Elks insisted on more money than the city would spend. One year later, the city upped their offer to $451,000, which was 10% more than assessed value, but in 1988, the Elks again declined to sell.

Around 1995, the city purchased 21 acres (8.5 ha) that became the Alfred A. Ring Park, abutting Glen Springs to the south. It was necessary to construct a bridge across the Glen Springs Run (outflow), and the slopes of the run were restored to a natural state. The Elks Club parking lot is used by those utilizing the Alfred A. Ring Park.

== Plan ==
Amy Grossman was searching the internet for springs close to Gainesville when she came upon a reference to Glen Springs. With some effort, she was able to visit the spring in person, and was acutely disappointed at the condition of the spring and surroundings. As a graduate student at the University of Florida in 2010, she proposed a project for her class: create a plan to resurrect Glen Springs. The instructor was Dr. Robert L. Knight, who also worked at the Florida Springs Institute as director. Knight endorsed the idea, and the result was the Glen Springs Restoration Plan (GSRP).

The GSRP was intended to draw attention to the resource, outline the history of the spring, identify current problems, and suggest possible resolutions. Assistance was provided by the Wildlife Foundation of Florida, who made a $2,500 grant to help create an "action plan" and a PowerPoint presentation. Wetland Solutions, Inc. provided technical support, and the Howard T. Odum Florida Springs Institute (FSI) published, disseminated and publicized the original report.

Two years later, the original document was expanded with septic tank pollution information, updated with new pictures, and re-released in October, 2012. The Florida Springs Institute began working with a group of Elks members to improve Glen Springs. If the site was listed on the National Register of Historic Places, it would be easier to fund the restoration. The Elks want to retain the pool, while FSI seeks to restore the spring to its natural state and improve flow and water quality. On April 21, 2012, the Elks Club hosted a cleanup day at the spring and invited community members to participate. Linda Califf led the Elks members and volunteers spent six hours raking algae, pressure washing and removing debris from the three pools.

In May 2012, Dr. Knight asked the city to support a restoration plan, but the commission is waiting to see what happens with privately funded efforts before they commit to the plan. As of 2023, no actions of any consequence had been taken regarding springs in Florida, which are in rapid decline.
