= Van Fleet Hall =

Building at the University of Florida

Coordinates: 29.6485378°N 82.3512499°W

James A. Van Fleet Hall
- Gainesville, Florida
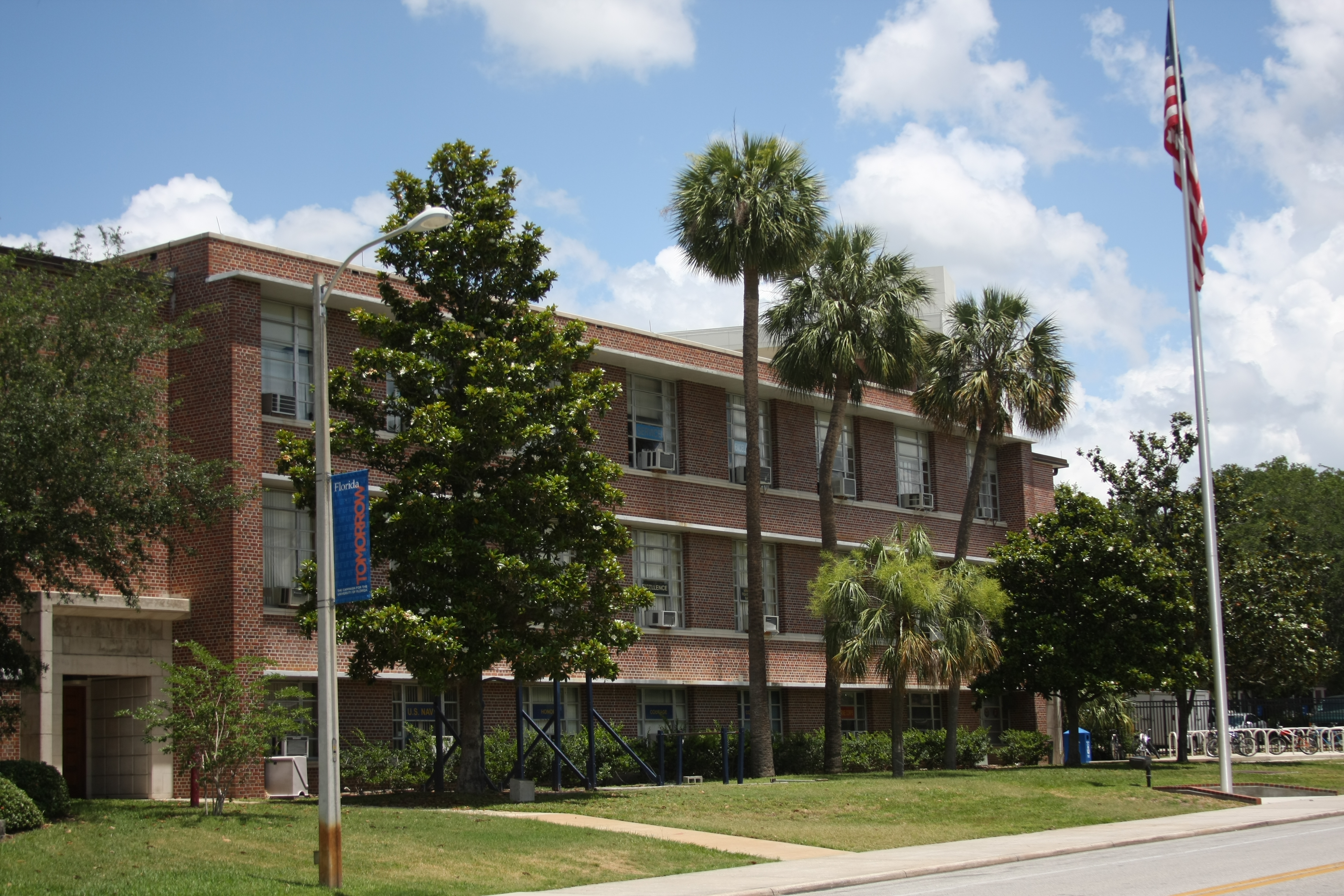

Site information
- Type: Training Facility

Site history
- Built: 1952
- Built by: Guy Fulton
- In use: 1952 - present

General James A. Van Fleet Hall is an historic building on the campus of the University of Florida in Gainesville, Florida, and completed in 1952. It was designed by Guy Fulton in a mild Mid-Century modern style as a Reserve Officer Training Corps (ROTC) classroom and training facility for University of Florida students seeking commissions in the Air Force, Army, Marines and Navy. The building is named for U.S. Army General James Van Fleet, who served as an ROTC instructor at the university and as the head coach of the Florida Gators football team from 1923 to 1924.

== See also ==
- Buildings at the University of Florida
- University of Florida ROTC
