= Guy Fulton =

American architect

Architect to the Florida Board of Control
- In office 1945–1956
- Preceded by: Rudolph Weaver
- Succeeded by: Forrest Kelly

Personal details
- Born: Guy Chandler Fulton; October 27, 1892 Warsaw, Illinois
- Died: October 15, 1974 (aged 81) Gainesville, Florida
- Spouse: Shirley Holmes
- Education: University of Illinois
- Profession: Architecture

Guy Chandler Fulton (October 27, 1892 – October 15, 1974) was an American architect known for his work on numerous buildings at the University of Florida while he was State Architect of Florida.

== Early life ==
Fulton was born in Warsaw, Illinois to Perry A Fulton and Luella ‘Lulu’ Chandler, but attended Keokuk High School in Iowa. After graduation, he was accepted at the University of Illinois, where he studied architecture. He graduated in 1916 with a Bachelor of Science in Architecture, then served in the U.S. Army in World War I from 1917 to 1919. After the war, Fulton gained experience working for various firms in the midwest.

Fulton married the former Shirley Holmes about 1922, but the couple had no children. He read about the Florida land boom of the 1920s and recognized an opportunity. The couple moved to Florida and he secured a job in the Florida State Architect's office as a draftsman in 1926. Around that time, he was commissioned to design the springhouse and spring-fed pool at Glen Springs in Gainesville. While he was proving himself at his state job, he also took numerous freelance jobs, primarily designing private residences. He was eventually named Assistant to the Architect, and received his architect's license in 1932. Fulton became a member of the American Institute of Architects in 1940. That same year, he redesigned the facility at Glen Springs, resulting in three pools with a "brilliant drainage system".

== Success ==
After World War II, college enrollment increased, resulting in a building boom on the Florida campus. Beginning in 1945, Fulton served as Architect to the Florida Board of Control, designing and supervising construction of University of Florida buildings, as well as those at Florida State University and Florida A&M University. His design theme at UF was that of a unified body of work, and his buildings used many of the same elements as his predecessors, Rudolph Weaver and William Augustus Edwards. He also established guidelines for materials and building construction for visual campus unity. He retired from the position in 1956 to work for his own firm, Guy C. Fulton & Associates. Following her death on November 29, 1990, funds from Shirley Fulton's estate were used to endow both the Guy C. Fulton Scholarship in Architecture and the Guy C. Fulton Scholarship in Engineering.

== Buildings ==
Buildings on or near the UF campus designed by Fulton include:

- Alpha Chi Omega Sorority House
- Alpha Delta Pi Sorority House
- Alpha Epsilon Pi Fraternity House
- Alpha Omicron Pi Sorority House
- Beta Theta Pi Fraternity House
- Broward Hall (named for Annie Isabell Broward)
- Bryan Hall-1949 North Addition
- Carleton Auditorium
- Catholic Student Center
- Century Tower
- Chi Omega Sorority House
- Delta Delta Delta Sorority House
- Delta Gamma Sorority House
- East Hall
- Florida Gymnasium
- Graham Hall
- The Hub
- Hume Hall (the original)
- J. Hillis Miller Health Science Center-1961 Pharmacy Wing
- Jennings Hall
- Kappa Delta Sorority House
- Library East-1940 addition (now part of the George A. Smathers Libraries)
- Mallory Hall
- Matherly Hall
- McCarty Hall A, B, C, D
- North Hall
- Phi Delta Theta Fraternity House (largest chapter in the U.S.)
- Phi Mu Sorority House
- Pi Lambda Phi Fraternity House
- Rawlings Hall
- Reid Hall
- Riker Hall
- Schucht Memorial Village
- Simpson Hall
- Sigma Kappa Sorority House
- Tau Epsilon Phi Fraternity House
- Theta Chi Fraternity House
- Tolbert Hall
- Trusler Hall
- UF Teaching Hospital (now part of Shands at the University of Florida)
- Van Fleet Hall
- Walker Hall
- Weaver Hall
- Weil Hall
- Williamson Hall
- Yon Hall (Stadium)
- Yulee Hall
- Zeta Beta Tau Fraternity House
