= Duke Crittenden =

American politician and businessman (1930–2009)

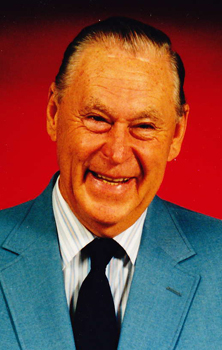

Chair of the Republican Party of Florida
- In office 1969–1971
- Preceded by: William F. Murfin
- Succeeded by: L. E. Thomas

Personal details
- Born: Earl M. Crittenden; August 30, 1930 Conway, Florida, U.S.
- Died: August 31, 2009 (aged 79) Orlando, Florida, U.S.
- Party: Republican
- Spouse: Helen Crittenden
- Children: 2
- Education: University of Florida (BS)
- Occupation: Businessman; politician

Earl M. "Duke" Crittenden (August 30, 1930 – August 31, 2009) was an American citrus magnate and politician. A member of the Republican Party, he served as chair of the Republican Party of Florida from 1969 to 1971 and as a member of the Florida Citrus Commission. He also served on the Florida Citrus Mutual board of directors.

== Early life and education ==
Crittenden was born on August 30, 1930, in Conway, Florida. Raised in Orange County, Florida, he graduated from Orlando Senior High in 1948 and went on to earn his bachelor's degree in agriculture from the University of Florida in 1953.

== Career ==
After World War II, with the wartime market gone, the citrus industry began to experience wild fluctuations in market prices. At times, the price of citrus fruit fell below the cost of production. In 1959, Crittenden founded the Crittenden Fruit Company. He purchased thousands of acres of orange groves across the state and his company eventually became one of the largest citrus companies in Florida. In 1983, Crittenden sold his company, but maintained ownership of his family's citrus groves.

In 1968, Crittenden served as campaign manager of Edward Gurney's successful U.S. Senate campaign. Gurney was the first Republican elected to the United States Senate from Florida since Reconstruction.

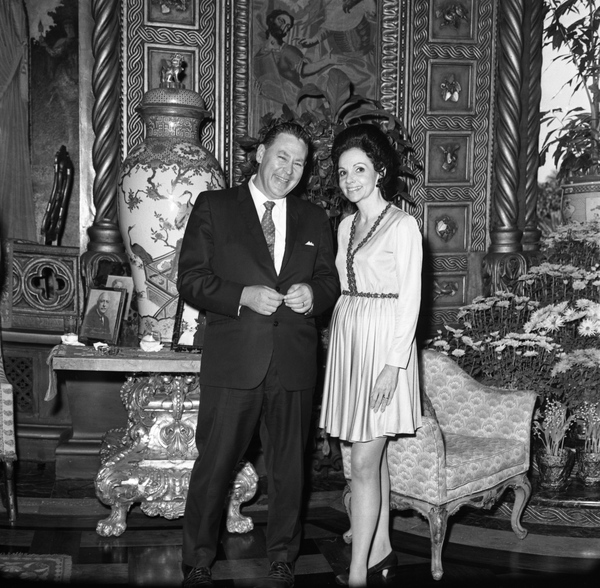
Crittenden with future U.S. Senator Paula Hawkins at Mar-a-Lago in 1970

In 1969, Crittenden was elected chair of the Republican Party of Florida, succeeding William F. Murfin. In 1971, he stepped down as chairman and was succeeded by L. E. Thomas.

In the mid-1970s, Crittenden was indicted, alongside Gurney, for illegal fundraising and influence peddling. Crittenden pleaded guilty to a misdemeanor count and was placed on 18 months' probation.

Crittenden served on the Florida Citrus Commission and the board of directors of Florida Citrus Mutual, the state's largest growers association.

He was inducted into the Florida Citrus Hall of Fame in 2010.

== Personal life and death ==
Crittenden was married to his wife, Helen; they had two sons, Earl Jr. and Brian.

Crittenden died on August 31, 2009, in Orlando, Florida. Upon the announcement of his death, former Congressman Louis Frey reacted by saying: "Duke was a major part of the political scene when the GOP was coming of age in Florida...He was there when we were building the party into a force in the state."
