= 1974 United States Senate election in Florida =

- November 5, 1974
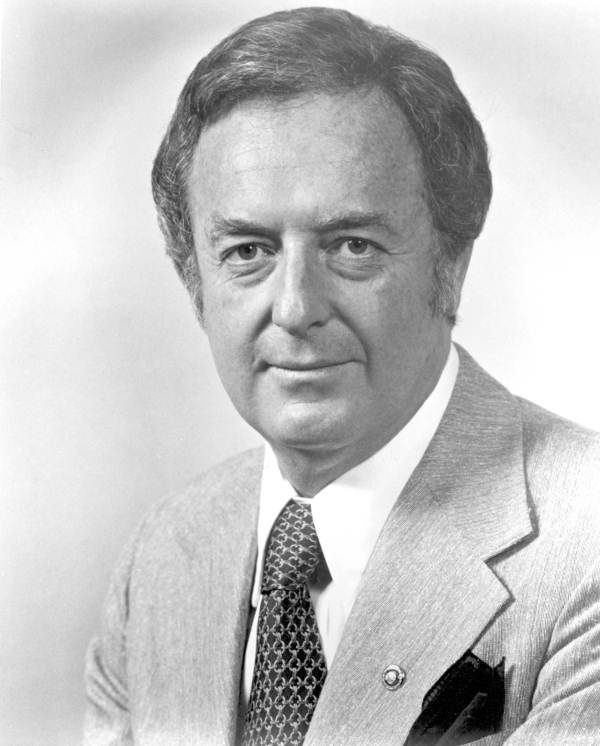

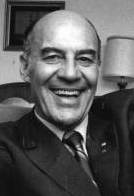

Nominee	Richard Stone	Jack Eckerd	John Grady
Party	Democratic	Republican	American Independent
Popular vote	781,031	736,674	282,659
Percentage	43.38%	40.91%	15.70%
- County results Stone: 30–40% 40–50% 50–60% 60–70% Eckerd: 30–40% 40–50% 50–60% 60–70% Grady: 40–50%
U.S. senator before election
Edward Gurney
Republican
Elected U.S. Senator
Richard Stone
Democratic

The 1974 United States Senate election in Florida was held on November 5, 1974. Incumbent Senator Edward Gurney, a Republican, declined to seek a second term after being indicted for taking bribes in return for his influence with the Federal Housing Administration. The primary for the Republican nomination pitted Eckerd drug store owner Jack Eckerd against Florida Public Service Commissioner Paula Hawkins. Eckerd won handily, receiving approximately 67.5% of the vote. The Democratic primary, however, was a crowded field, with eleven candidates vying for the nomination. Because no candidate received a majority of the votes, U.S. Representative Bill Gunter and Secretary of State of Florida Richard Stone advanced to a run-off election. Stone won by a small margin of 1.68%.

Thus, Eckerd and Stone faced off in the general election. John Grady, a family physician and member of George Wallace's American Independent Party, performed very well for a third-party candidate. On election day, Stone received 43.38% of the vote, Eckerd garnered 40.91% of the vote, and Grady acquired 15.7% of the vote. Stone served only one term in the Senate and would be defeated by Gunter in the Democratic primary in 1980.

== Democratic primary ==
The Democratic primary consisted of a large field of 11 candidates. 13.6% of the voting age population participated in the Democratic primary.

=== Candidates ===
- George Balmer, body shop owner and Republican candidate for U.S. Senate in 1970
- Bob Brewster
- Bill Gunter, incumbent U.S. representative from Orlando
- David B. Higginbottom, lawyer and candidate for the Florida House of Representatives in 1954 and 1956
- Mallory Horne, incumbent president of the Florida Senate
- Neal Justin, professor at Florida Atlantic University and former member of the Arizona House of Representatives
- Duaine E. Macon, real estate salesman
- Richard A. Pettigrew, former speaker of the Florida House of Representatives
- Richard Stone, incumbent secretary of state of Florida
- Glenn W. Turner, owner of multi-level marketing companies
- Burton Young, president of the Florida Bar

Democratic primary results
Party	Candidate	Votes	%
Democratic	Richard Stone	236,185	29.80%
Democratic	Bill Gunter	157,301	19.85%
Democratic	Richard A. Pettigrew	146,728	18.51%
Democratic	Mallory Horne	90,684	11.44%
Democratic	Glenn W. Turner	51,326	6.48%
Democratic	George Balmer	24,408	3.08%
Democratic	Burton Young	23,199	2.93%
Democratic	Bob Brewster	19,913	2.51%
Democratic	David B. Higginbottom	17,401	1.64%
Democratic	Duaine E. Macon	14,961	1.89%
Total votes		782,106	100.00%

Democratic primary runoff results
Party	Candidate	Votes	%
Democratic	Richard Stone	321,683	50.84%
Democratic	Bill Gunter	311,044	49.16%
Total votes		632,727	100.00%

== Republican primary ==
The Republican primary was a smaller affair than its Democratic counterpart, with two candidates. 4.7% of the voting-age population participated in the Republican primary.

=== Candidates ===
- Jack Eckerd, founder of Eckerd Corporation and 1966 gubernatorial candidate
- Paula Hawkins, Florida public service commissioner

=== Results ===
Republican primary results
Party	Candidate	Votes	%
Republican	Jack Eckerd	186,897	67.49%
Republican	Paula Hawkins	90,049	32.52%
Total votes		276,946	100.00%

== General election ==
=== Candidates ===
- Timothy L. "Tim" Adams (Independent)
- Hortense L. Arvan (Independent)
- Jack Eckerd, founder of Eckerd Corporation and 1966 gubernatorial candidate (Republican)
- Jim Fair, Hillsborough County supervisor of elections (Independent)
- John Grady, mayor of Belle Glade and family physician (American Independent Party)
- Henry J. Matthews (Independent)
- Richard Stone, secretary of state of Florida (Democratic)

=== Results ===
General election results
Party	Candidate	Votes	%
Democratic	Richard Stone	781,031	43.38%
Republican	Jack Eckerd	736,674	40.91%
American Independent	John Grady	282,659	15.70%
Independent	Jim Fair	117	0.01%
Independent	Henry J. Matthew	35	0.00%
Independent	Hortense L. Arvan	13	0.00%
Independent	Timothy L. "Tim" Adams	10	0.00%
Majority		44,357	3.32%
Turnout		1,800,539	
Democratic gain from Republican			

== See also ==
- United States Senate elections, 1974 and 1975

== Works cited ==
- Steed, Robert; Moreland, Laurence; Baker, Tod, eds. (1980). Party Politics in the South. Praeger Publishers. ISBN 0030565863.
