= Women in the United States Senate =

This article covers the history of women in the United States Senate and various milestones achieved by female senators. It includes a list of all women who have served in the Senate, a list of current female senators, and a list of states represented by women in the Senate. The first female U.S. senator, Rebecca Latimer Felton, represented Georgia for a single day in 1922, and the first woman elected to the Senate, Hattie Caraway, was elected to represent Arkansas in 1932.

Currently (since July 14, 2026), 27 women are serving in the Senate, which is the most women who have ever served in the Senate at the same time.

== History ==
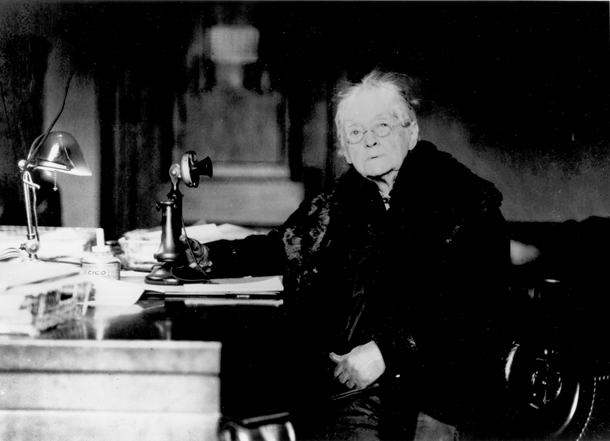
Rebecca Latimer Felton, the first woman in the United States Senate, who served representing Georgia for a single day in 1922.

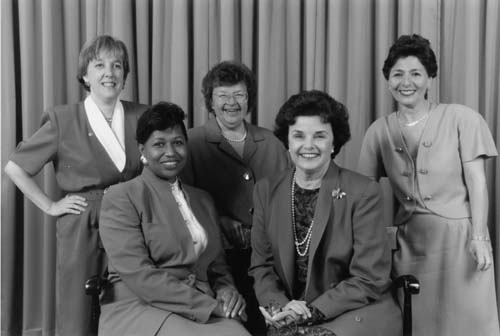
One woman (Barbara Mikulski) was reelected and four women were elected to the Senate in 1992, the "Year of the Woman".

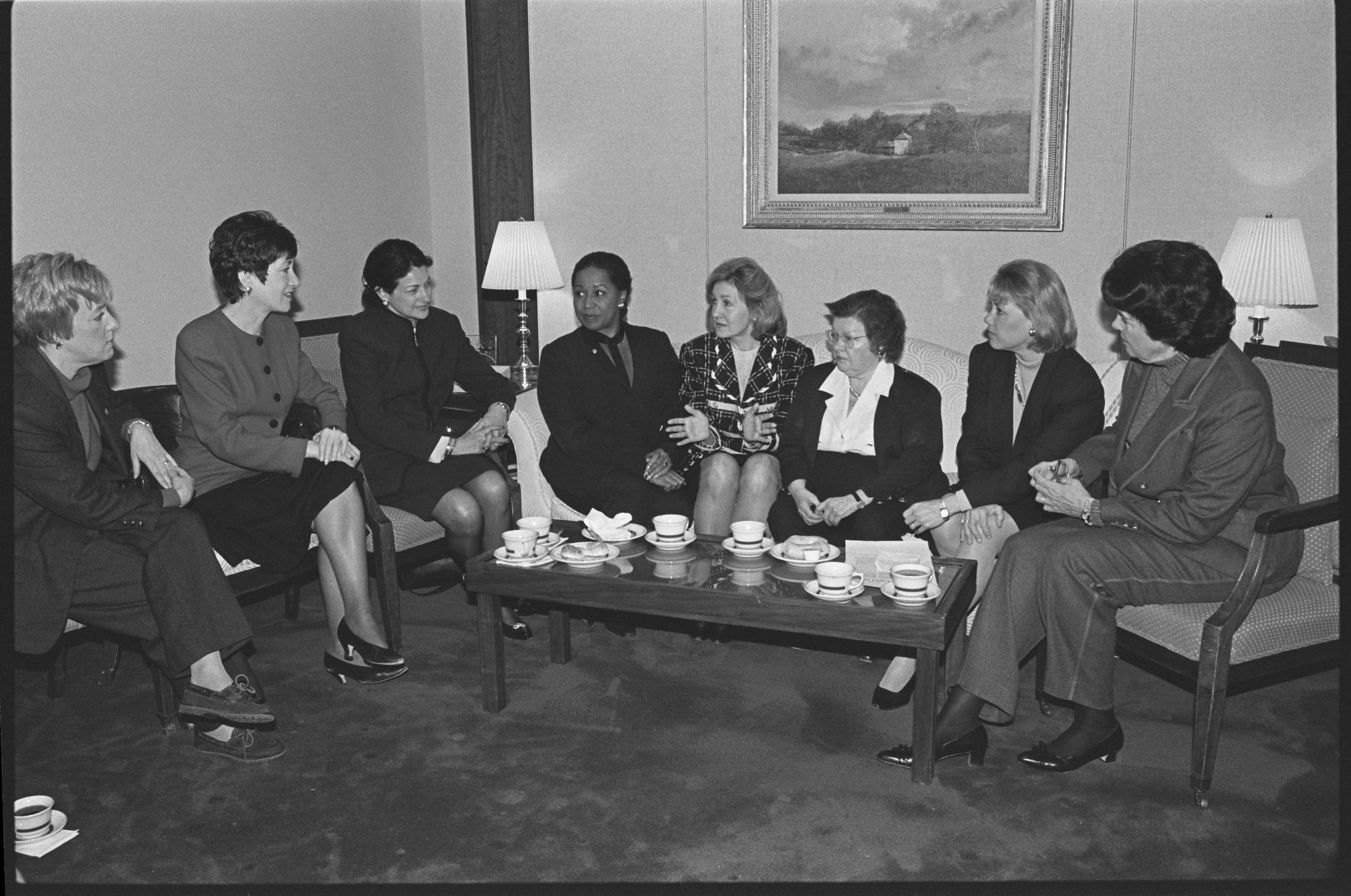
There were eight female senators by December 1997.

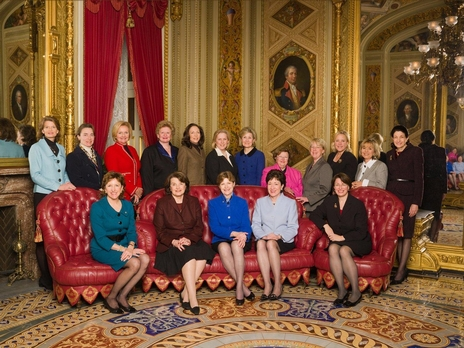
In 2009, the number of female senators had increased to 17.

The first time a woman was nominated for the Senate was in 1893 in Wyoming, where women have had the vote since 1869. The nomination happened through a party caucus, since this was before 1913 when the Seventeenth Amendment established popular elections for senators. Mary Jane Bartlett was nominated by the Wyoming Populists, receiving their unanimous nomination. However, the Wyoming legislature was deadlocked for weeks of voting on their senators: Republicans, Democrats, and Populists mostly voted for their own candidates. Bartlett received all six populist votes on a number of ballots in the legislature, but time ran out to choose the senator, and Wyoming ended up serving with only one senator, rather than two, that term.

The first woman to serve in the U.S. Senate was Rebecca Latimer Felton; she represented Georgia for one day as a symbolic gesture in 1922. Ten years later, Hattie Caraway became the first woman to win election to the Senate, representing Arkansas. She first was appointed to fill the vacancy caused by her husband's death, and then was elected to two full terms; she was the first woman re-elected to the Senate. In 1938, Gladys Pyle became the first woman elected to the Senate without having previously been appointed to her position, and the first Republican female senator. In 1949, Margaret Chase Smith began her service in the Senate after serving in the House; she was the first woman to serve in both the House and Senate. Her 1960 reelection bid resulted in Chase Smith winning the nation's first-ever Senate election with two female major party nominees; the other major party nominee was Lucia Cormier. In 1978, Muriel Humphrey became the first former Second Lady to serve in the United States Senate, after her husband Hubert Humphrey's death in office. She was appointed to fill his Senate seat; she served for less than one year and declined to run for election to the seat. Also in 1978, Nancy Kassebaum became the first woman ever elected to a full term in the Senate without succeeding her spouse. However, Kassebaum's father Alf Landon was a former governor of Kansas, which means that the first woman to be elected to a full term in the Senate without being the daughter or wife of a politician was Paula Hawkins, who was elected in 1980 to represent Florida. Hawkins was also the first Mormon woman elected to the Senate.

The hotly contested Senate confirmation hearings in 1991 for Supreme Court nominee Clarence Thomas involving the allegations of Anita Hill raised the question of the dominance of men in the Senate. Soon after, 1992 was dubbed the "Year of the Woman"; it was the first year in which four women were elected to the Senate. They were Patty Murray of Washington, Carol Moseley Braun of Illinois, Dianne Feinstein of California, and Barbara Boxer of California. This made California the first state represented by two women senators (Feinstein and Boxer). Feinstein was also the first female Jewish senator. Carol Moseley Braun was the first African American woman to serve in the Senate.

Women in the Senate have had their own restroom off the Senate floor since 1993. Women were not allowed to wear pants on the Senate floor until that same year, although the rule was seldom enforced. In 1993, senators Barbara Mikulski and Carol Moseley Braun wore pants onto the floor in defiance of the rule, and female support staff followed soon after, with the rule being amended later that year by Senate Sergeant-at-Arms Martha Pope to allow women to wear pants on the floor so long as they also wore a jacket.

Olympia Snowe was the first woman to serve in both houses of a state legislature and both houses of Congress, being elected to the Senate in 1994 after having served in the Maine state house and senate and the House of Representatives. In 2000 Hillary Clinton became the first First Lady to be elected to the Senate. In 2008, Kay Hagan became the first woman to defeat a female incumbent in the Senate, Elizabeth Dole. That same year, Jeanne Shaheen became the first woman to have been elected governor and senator, being elected senator in 2008 after having been governor. In 2009, North Carolina became the first state represented by female senators of both parties. In 2010, Lisa Murkowski became the first female senator, and the second of all senators, to win a write-in campaign for the Senate.

In 2012, five new female senators were elected. This beat the record of four new female senators from 1992. The five new women were Democrats Tammy Baldwin of Wisconsin, Heidi Heitkamp of North Dakota, Mazie Hirono of Hawaii, Elizabeth Warren of Massachusetts, and Republican Deb Fischer of Nebraska. Hirono was the first Asian-American woman and first Buddhist elected to the Senate, and Baldwin was the first openly gay person elected to the Senate.

In 2014, Joni Ernst was elected as the first female combat veteran to serve in the Senate. In 2016, Catherine Cortez Masto was elected as the first Latina senator, while Tammy Duckworth was elected as the first female double amputee in the Senate, and that same year, Hillary Clinton became the first woman, and the first female former senator, to have a major party's nomination for President of the United States. Despite winning the popular vote, she ultimately lost to Donald Trump. In 2018, Kyrsten Sinema was elected as Arizona's first female senator and the first openly bisexual senator from any state, defeating Martha McSally. Also in 2018, Jacky Rosen made political history as the first freshman congresswoman ever elected to the Senate, and Tammy Duckworth became the first sitting senator to give birth.

Some female U.S. senators have run for U.S. president (see list of female United States presidential and vice presidential candidates), and in 2021, former senator Kamala Harris became the first female vice president of the United States and president of the U.S. Senate.

In 2023, Patty Murray became the first woman to serve as president pro tempore, a role traditionally given to the most senior member of the majority party in the United States Senate. Dianne Feinstein was the most senior Democratic senator but declined to serve. This made Murray the third person in line to become president, after the vice president and the Speaker of the House. Later that year, Feinstein became the first female senator to die in office. Also that year, Murray became the first woman, and 33rd senator overall, to have cast 10,000 votes in the Senate, having reached the threshold on April 20, 2023.

In 2024, Angela Alsobrooks of Maryland and Lisa Blunt Rochester of Delaware became the first two black women elected to serve simultaneously in the Senate.

Following the death of Lindsey Graham in 2026, Darline Graham, sworn in on July 14 of that year, became the first woman to represent South Carolina in the Senate, the first sister to replace her brother in Congress, and also the first sibling to replace a deceased senator. Her appointment marked the first time 27 women served concurrently in the Senate, the highest number in its history. This included a record high number of eleven Republican women serving at once, of which Graham herself was one.

Later in 2026, Peggy Flanagan and Mary Peltola became the first Native American women elected to the Senate. Peltola was also the first Alaska Native of any gender elected to the Senate.

== Election, selection, and children ==
Women are much less likely than men to decide to run for election, despite generally having the same chances of winning elections as male counterparts. Research by Jennifer Lawless and Richard Fox shines light on a few possible reasons. Women report much less enthusiasm for the motions of campaigning (such as fundraising or attending rallies) than men. They are more likely than men to decide not to campaign based on lack of resources. They are also much more likely than men to view themselves as lacking credentials, and time (even women with full-time jobs report spending more time on household chores than men). Finally, they are more likely than men to view races as competitive.

Many women have joined the U.S. Senate through appointment following the death or resignation of a husband or father who previously held the seat. Hattie Caraway was the first woman appointed to the Senate to succeed her dead former husband, in 1931. Another example is Muriel Humphrey, who in 1978 became the first former Second Lady to serve in the United States Senate, after her husband Hubert Humphrey's death in office. She was appointed to fill his Senate seat; she served for less than one year and declined to run for election to the seat. In 2002, Lisa Murkowski became the first daughter to be appointed to her father’s Senate seat (by her father).

The first woman ever elected to a full term in the Senate without succeeding her spouse was Nancy Kassebaum in 1978, although she was the daughter of former Kansas governor and one-time presidential candidate Alf Landon. Shortly before retiring from the Senate, she married former senator Howard Baker. The first woman to be elected to a full term in the Senate without being the daughter or wife of a politician was Paula Hawkins, who was elected in 1980.

On April 9, 2018, Tammy Duckworth, at age 50, gave birth to her daughter Maile Pearl, becoming the first sitting senator to give birth. Shortly thereafter, still in April, the Senate's rules were changed to allow senators to bring with them to the Senate floor their children under one year of age, and breastfeed them during votes. The day after those rules were changed, Maile became the first baby on the Senate floor when Duckworth brought her.

== List of female U.S. senators ==
Name (lifespan)	State	Term			Entered by	Left for	Party
Name (lifespan)	State	Start	End	Duration (days)	Entered by	Left for	Party
Rebecca Felton (1835–1930)	(Georgia (U.S. state)) Georgia	November 21, 1922	November 22, 1922	1 (1 day)	Appointment by Thomas W. Hardwick	Appointment ended	Democratic
Hattie Caraway (1878–1950)	Arkansas	November 13, 1931	January 3, 1945	4,800 (13 years, 51 days)	Appointment by Harvey Parnell	Lost renomination	Democratic
Rose Long (1892–1970)	Louisiana	January 31, 1936	January 3, 1937	338 (338 days)	Appointment by James Noe	Retired	Democratic
Dixie Graves (1882–1965)	Alabama	August 20, 1937	January 10, 1938	143 (143 days)	Appointment by Bibb Graves	Appointment ended	Democratic
Gladys Pyle (1890–1989)	South Dakota	November 9, 1938	January 3, 1939	55 (55 days)	Special election	Retired	Republican
Vera C. Bushfield (1889–1976)	South Dakota	October 6, 1948	December 26, 1948	81 (81 days)	Appointment by George Mickelson	Appointment ended	Republican
Margaret Chase Smith (1897–1995)	Maine	January 3, 1949	January 3, 1973	8,766 (24 years, 0 days)	Election	Lost reelection	Republican
Eva Bowring (1892–1985)	Nebraska	April 16, 1954	November 7, 1954	205 (205 days)	Appointment by Robert B. Crosby	Appointment ended	Republican
Hazel Abel (1888–1966)	Nebraska	November 8, 1954	December 31, 1954	53 (53 days)	Special election	Retired and resigned early	Republican
Maurine Neuberger (1907–2000)	Oregon	November 9, 1960	January 3, 1967	2,246 (6 years, 55 days)	Special election	Retired	Democratic
Elaine Edwards (1929–2018)	Louisiana	August 1, 1972	November 13, 1972	104 (104 days)	Appointment by Edwin Edwards	Appointment ended	Democratic
Muriel Humphrey (1912–1998)	Minnesota	January 25, 1978	November 7, 1978	286 (286 days)	Appointment by Rudy Perpich	Appointment ended	Democratic
Maryon Allen (1925–2018)	Alabama	June 8, 1978	November 7, 1978	152 (152 days)	Appointment by George Wallace	Lost nomination to finish term	Democratic
Nancy Kassebaum (1932–2026)	Kansas	December 23, 1978	January 3, 1997	6,586 (18 years, 11 days)	Election	Retired	Republican
Paula Hawkins (1927–2009)	Florida	January 1, 1981	January 3, 1987	2,193 (6 years, 2 days)	Election	Lost reelection	Republican
Barbara Mikulski (born 1936)	Maryland	January 3, 1987	January 3, 2017	10,959 (30 years, 0 days)	Election	Retired	Democratic
Jocelyn Burdick (1922–2019)	North Dakota	September 12, 1992	December 14, 1992	93 (93 days)	Appointment by George Sinner	Appointment ended	Democratic–NPL
Dianne Feinstein (1933–2023)	California	November 4, 1992	September 29, 2023	11,286 (30 years, 329 days)	Special election	Died in office	Democratic
Barbara Boxer (born 1940)	California	January 3, 1993	January 3, 2017	8,767 (24 years, 0 days)	Election	Retired	Democratic
Carol Moseley-Braun (born 1947)	Illinois	January 3, 1993	January 3, 1999	2,191 (6 years, 0 days)	Election	Lost reelection	Democratic
Patty Murray (born 1950)	(Washington (state)) Washington	January 3, 1993	present	12,375 (33 years, 322 days)	Election	Incumbent	Democratic
Kay Hutchison (born 1943)	Texas	June 14, 1993	January 3, 2013	7,143 (19 years, 203 days)	Special election	Retired	Republican
Olympia Snowe (born 1947)	Maine	January 3, 1995	January 3, 2013	6,576 (18 years, 0 days)	Election	Retired	Republican
Sheila Frahm (born 1945)	Kansas	June 11, 1996	November 6, 1996	148 (148 days)	Appointment by Bill Graves	Lost nomination to finish term	Republican
Susan Collins (born 1952)	Maine	January 3, 1997	January 3, 2027	10,914 (29 years, 322 days)	Election	Lost reelection	Republican
Mary Landrieu (born 1955)	Louisiana	January 3, 1997	January 3, 2015	6,575 (18 years, 0 days)	Election	Lost reelection	Democratic
Blanche Lincoln (born 1960)	Arkansas	January 3, 1999	January 3, 2011	4,383 (12 years, 0 days)	Election	Lost reelection	Democratic
Maria Cantwell (born 1958)	(Washington (state)) Washington	January 3, 2001	present	9,453 (25 years, 322 days)	Election	Incumbent	Democratic
Jean Carnahan (1933–2024)	Missouri	January 3, 2001	November 23, 2002	689 (1 year, 324 days)	Appointment by Roger B. Wilson	Lost election to finish term	Democratic
Hillary Clinton (born 1947)	(New York (state)) New York	January 3, 2001	January 21, 2009	2,940 (8 years, 18 days)	Election	Resigned to become United States Secretary of State	Democratic
Debbie Stabenow (born 1950)	Michigan	January 3, 2001	January 3, 2025	8,766 (24 years, 0 days)	Election	Retired	Democratic
Lisa Murkowski (born 1957)	Alaska	December 20, 2002	present	8,737 (23 years, 336 days)	Appointment by Frank Murkowski	Incumbent	Republican
Elizabeth Dole (born 1936)	North Carolina	January 3, 2003	January 3, 2009	2,192 (6 years, 0 days)	Election	Lost reelection	Republican
Amy Klobuchar (born 1960)	Minnesota	January 3, 2007	January 4, 2027	7,262 (19 years, 322 days)	Election	Resigning to become Governor of Minnesota	Democratic
Claire McCaskill (born 1953)	Missouri	January 3, 2007	January 3, 2019	4,383 (12 years, 0 days)	Election	Lost reelection	Democratic
Jeanne Shaheen (born 1947)	New Hampshire	January 3, 2009	January 3, 2027	6,531 (17 years, 322 days)	Election	Retiring	Democratic
Kay Hagan (1953–2019)	North Carolina	January 3, 2009	January 3, 2015	2,191 (6 years, 0 days)	Election	Lost reelection	Democratic
Kirsten Gillibrand (born 1966)	(New York (state)) New York	January 26, 2009	present	6,508 (17 years, 299 days)	Appointment by David Paterson	Incumbent	Democratic
Kelly Ayotte (born 1968)	New Hampshire	January 3, 2011	January 3, 2017	2,192 (6 years, 0 days)	Election	Lost reelection	Republican
Tammy Baldwin (born 1962)	Wisconsin	January 3, 2013	present	5,070 (13 years, 322 days)	Election	Incumbent	Democratic
Deb Fischer (born 1951)	Nebraska	January 3, 2013	present	5,070 (13 years, 322 days)	Election	Incumbent	Republican
Heidi Heitkamp (born 1955)	North Dakota	January 3, 2013	January 3, 2019	2,191 (6 years, 0 days)	Election	Lost reelection	Democratic–NPL
Mazie Hirono (born 1947)	Hawaii	January 3, 2013	present	5,070 (13 years, 322 days)	Election	Incumbent	Democratic
Elizabeth Warren (born 1949)	Massachusetts	January 3, 2013	present	5,070 (13 years, 322 days)	Election	Incumbent	Democratic
Joni Ernst (born 1970)	Iowa	January 3, 2015	January 3, 2027	4,340 (11 years, 322 days)	Election	Retiring	Republican
Shelley Moore Capito (born 1953)	West Virginia	January 3, 2015	present	4,340 (11 years, 322 days)	Election	Incumbent	Republican
Catherine Cortez Masto (born 1964)	Nevada	January 3, 2017	present	3,609 (9 years, 322 days)	Election	Incumbent	Democratic
Tammy Duckworth (born 1968)	Illinois	January 3, 2017	present	3,609 (9 years, 322 days)	Election	Incumbent	Democratic
Kamala Harris (born 1964) (tenure)	California	January 3, 2017	January 18, 2021	1,476 (4 years, 15 days)	Election	Resigned to become Vice President of the United States	Democratic
Maggie Hassan (born 1958)	New Hampshire	January 3, 2017	present	3,609 (9 years, 322 days)	Election	Incumbent	Democratic
Tina Smith (born 1958)	Minnesota	January 3, 2018	January 3, 2027	3,244 (8 years, 322 days)	Appointment by Mark Dayton	Retiring	Democratic
Cindy Hyde-Smith (born 1959)	Mississippi	April 2, 2018	January 3, 2027	3,155 (8 years, 233 days)	Appointment by Phil Bryant	Lost reelection	Republican
Marsha Blackburn (born 1952)	Tennessee	January 3, 2019	January 16, 2027	2,879 (7 years, 322 days)	Election	Resigning to become Governor of Tennessee	Republican
Kyrsten Sinema (born 1976)	Arizona	January 3, 2019	January 3, 2025	2,192 (6 years, 0 days)	Election	Retired	Democratic (2019–2022)
Kyrsten Sinema (born 1976)	Arizona	January 3, 2019	January 3, 2025	2,192 (6 years, 0 days)	Election	Retired	Independent (2022–2025)
Martha McSally (born 1966)	Arizona	January 3, 2019	December 2, 2020	699 (1 year, 334 days)	Appointment by Doug Ducey	Lost election to finish term	Republican
Jacky Rosen (born 1957)	Nevada	January 3, 2019	present	2,879 (7 years, 322 days)	Election	Incumbent	Democratic
Kelly Loeffler (born 1970)	(Georgia (U.S. state)) Georgia	January 6, 2020	January 20, 2021	380 (1 year, 14 days)	Appointment by Brian Kemp	Lost election to finish term	Republican
Cynthia Lummis (born 1954)	Wyoming	January 3, 2021	January 3, 2027	2,148 (5 years, 322 days)	Election	Retiring	Republican
Katie Britt (born 1982)	Alabama	January 3, 2023	present	1,418 (3 years, 322 days)	Election	Incumbent	Republican
Laphonza Butler (born 1979)	California	October 1, 2023	December 8, 2024	434 (1 year, 68 days)	Appointment by Gavin Newsom	Appointment ended	Democratic
Angela Alsobrooks (born 1971)	Maryland	January 3, 2025	present	687 (1 year, 322 days)	Election	Incumbent	Democratic
Lisa Blunt Rochester (born 1962)	Delaware	January 3, 2025	present	687 (1 year, 322 days)	Election	Incumbent	Democratic
Elissa Slotkin (born 1976)	Michigan	January 3, 2025	present	687 (1 year, 322 days)	Election	Incumbent	Democratic
Ashley Moody (born 1975)	Florida	January 21, 2025	present	669 (1 year, 304 days)	Appointment by Ron DeSantis	Incumbent	Republican
Darline Graham (born 1964)	South Carolina	July 14, 2026	January 3, 2027	130 (130 days)	Appointment by Henry McMaster	Lost election to a full term	Republican
Annie Andrews (born 1980)	South Carolina	January 3, 2027	Elect	−43 (−43 days)	Election		Democratic
Peggy Flanagan (born 1979)	Minnesota	January 3, 2027	Elect	−43 (−43 days)	Election		Democratic
Harriet Hageman (born 1962)	Wyoming	January 3, 2027	Elect	−43 (−43 days)	Election		Republican
Julia Letlow (born 1981)	Louisiana	January 3, 2027	Elect	−43 (−43 days)	Election		Republican
Mary Peltola (born 1973)	Alaska	January 3, 2027	Elect	−43 (−43 days)	Election		Democratic
Juliana Stratton (born 1965)	Illinois	January 3, 2027	Elect	−43 (−43 days)	Election		Democratic

== Currently serving female U.S. senators ==
Map of current female senators by state. Two female senators One female senator (other is male) No female senators (both are male)

Pink represents the Women in the United States Senate

There are 27 women currently serving in the United States Senate. This is the highest number of women to have served concurrently in U.S. Senate history. Eleven (a record high number) are Republicans.

That record was achieved in July 2026 when Darline Graham was appointed to complete the unexpired term of her brother, Lindsey Graham, making her the first woman in the history of the United States Congress to have succeeded her deceased sibling, and also the first sibling to replace a deceased senator.

Prior to Graham's appointment, the Senate's record of 26 women was first achieved in January 2020 when Kelly Loeffler was appointed to the Senate from Georgia, increasing the number of women in the Senate from 25 to 26. The number fell back to 25 on December 2 of the same year when Martha McSally's appointment ended after she lost an election to finish John McCain's unexpired term. The record of 26 was reached again on January 3, 2021, when Cynthia Lummis, the first female senator from Wyoming, began her term. The record was sustained for only 15 days, as the number of concurrently serving women dropped again to 25 when Kamala Harris resigned her Senate seat on January 18 in anticipation of the scheduled commencement of her term as vice president (and thus president of the Senate) on January 20.

As of January 2025, four states (Minnesota, Nevada, New Hampshire, and Washington) are represented by two female U.S. senators (see appropriate section).

11 of the women currently serving in the Senate have previously served in the U.S. House of Representatives: Senators Cantwell, Gillibrand, Baldwin, Hirono, Moore Capito, Duckworth, Rosen, Blackburn, Lummis, Blunt Rochester, and Slotkin.

Class	State	Name	Party	Prior experience	First took office	Born
3	Alabama	Katie Britt	Republican	CEO of the Business Council of Alabama, chief of staff to predecessor Richard Shelby	2023 (age 40)	1982
3	Alaska	Lisa Murkowski	Republican	Alaska House of Representatives	2002 (age 45)	1957
1	Delaware	Lisa Blunt Rochester	Democratic	Delaware Secretary of Labor, U.S. House of Representatives	2025 (age 62)	1962
3	Florida	Ashley Moody	Republican	Florida Attorney General	2025 (age 49)	1975
1	Hawaii	Mazie Hirono	Democratic	Hawaii House of Representatives, Lieutenant Governor of Hawaii, gubernatorial nominee, U.S. House of Representatives	2013 (age 65)	1947
3	Illinois	Tammy Duckworth	Democratic	U.S. House of Representatives	2017 (age 48)	1968
2	Iowa	Joni Ernst	Republican	Montgomery County Auditor, Iowa Senate	2015 (age 44)	1970
2	Maine	Susan Collins	Republican	Massachusetts Deputy Treasurer, gubernatorial nominee	1997 (age 44)	1952
1	Maryland	Angela Alsobrooks	Democratic	Prince George's County State Attorney, Prince George's County Executive	2025 (age 53)	1971
1	Massachusetts	Elizabeth Warren	Democratic	Special advisor to the president for the Consumer Financial Protection Bureau	2013 (age 63)	1949
1	Michigan	Elissa Slotkin	Democratic	Central Intelligence Agency, Assistant Secretary of Defense (ISA), U.S. House of Representatives	2025 (age 48)	1976
1	Minnesota	Amy Klobuchar	Democratic-Farmer-Labor	Hennepin County Attorney	2007 (age 46)	1960
2	Minnesota	Tina Smith	Democratic-Farmer-Labor	Lieutenant Governor of Minnesota	2018 (age 60)	1958
2	Mississippi	Cindy Hyde-Smith	Republican	Mississippi Senate, Mississippi Commissioner of Agriculture and Commerce	2018 (age 58)	1959
1	Nebraska	Deb Fischer	Republican	Nebraska Legislature	2013 (age 61)	1951
3	Nevada	Catherine Cortez Masto	Democratic	Nevada Attorney General	2017 (age 52)	1964
1	Nevada	Jacky Rosen	Democratic	U.S. House of Representatives	2019 (age 61)	1957
2	New Hampshire	Jeanne Shaheen	Democratic	New Hampshire Senate, Governor of New Hampshire	2009 (age 61)	1947
3	New Hampshire	Maggie Hassan	Democratic	New Hampshire Senate, Governor of New Hampshire	2017 (age 58)	1958
1	New York	Kirsten Gillibrand	Democratic	U.S. House of Representatives	2009 (age 42)	1966
2	South Carolina	Darline Graham	Republican	South Carolina Commission for the Blind Agency Head and Commissioner	2026 (age 62)	1964
1	Tennessee	Marsha Blackburn	Republican	Tennessee Senate, U.S. House of Representatives	2019 (age 66)	1952
3	Washington	Patty Murray	Democratic	Washington Senate	1993 (age 42)	1950
1	Washington	Maria Cantwell	Democratic	Washington House of Representatives, U.S. House of Representatives	2001 (age 42)	1958
2	West Virginia	Shelley Moore Capito	Republican	West Virginia House of Delegates, U.S. House of Representatives	2015 (age 62)	1953
1	Wisconsin	Tammy Baldwin	Democratic	Wisconsin State Assembly, U.S. House of Representatives	2013 (age 50)	1962
2	Wyoming	Cynthia Lummis	Republican	Wyoming House of Representatives, Wyoming Senate, Wyoming Treasurer, U.S. House of Representatives	2021 (age 66)	1954

== List of states represented by women ==
35 states have been represented by female senators. As of July 14, 2026, 23 states are currently represented by female senators.

State	Current	Previous	Total	First woman senator	Years represented by female senators	Year first elected a female senator
Alabama	1	2	3	Dixie Graves	1937–1938, 1978, 2023–present	2022
Alaska	1	0	1	Lisa Murkowski	2002–present	2004
Arizona	0	2	2	Kyrsten Sinema and Martha McSally	2019–2025	2018
Arkansas	0	2	2	Hattie Caraway	1931–1945, 1999–2011	1932
California	0	4	4	Dianne Feinstein	1992–2023, 2023–2024	1992 (special), 1992 (regular)
Colorado	0	0	0			
Connecticut	0	0	0			
Delaware	1	0	1	Lisa Blunt Rochester	2025–present	2024
Florida	1	1	2	Paula Hawkins	1981–1987, 2025–present	1980
Georgia	0	2	2	Rebecca Felton	1922, 2020–2021	N/A; both female senators were appointed
Hawaii	1	0	1	Mazie Hirono	2013–present	2012
Idaho	0	0	0			
Illinois	1	1	2	Carol Moseley-Braun	1993–1999, 2017–present	1992
Indiana	0	0	0			
Iowa	1	0	1	Joni Ernst	2015–present	2014
Kansas	0	2	2	Nancy Kassebaum	1978–1997	1978
Kentucky	0	0	0			
Louisiana	0	3	3	Rose Long	1936–1937, 1972, 1997–2015	1936 (special)
Maine	1	2	3	Margaret Chase Smith	1949–1973, 1995–present	1948
Maryland	1	1	2	Barbara Mikulski	1987–2017, 2025–present	1986
Massachusetts	1	0	1	Elizabeth Warren	2013–present	2012
Michigan	1	1	2	Debbie Stabenow	2001–present	2000
Minnesota	2	1	3	Muriel Humphrey	1978, 2007–present	2006
Mississippi	1	0	1	Cindy Hyde-Smith	2018–present	2018 (special)
Missouri	0	2	2	Jean Carnahan	2001–2002, 2007–2019	2006
Montana	0	0	0			
Nebraska	1	2	3	Eva Bowring	1954, 2013–present	1954 (special, Class 2)
Nevada	2	0	2	Catherine Cortez Masto	2017–present	2016
New Hampshire	2	1	3	Jeanne Shaheen	2009–present	2008
New Jersey	0	0	0			
New Mexico	0	0	0			
New York	1	1	2	Hillary Clinton	2001–2009, 2009–present	2000
North Carolina	0	2	2	Elizabeth Dole	2003–2015	2002
North Dakota	0	2	2	Jocelyn Burdick	1992, 2013–2019	2012
Ohio	0	0	0			
Oklahoma	0	0	0			
Oregon	0	1	1	Maurine Neuberger	1960–1967	1960 (special)
Pennsylvania	0	0	0			
Rhode Island	0	0	0			
South Carolina	1	0	1	Darline Graham	2026–present	2026
South Dakota	0	2	2	Gladys Pyle	1938–1939, 1948	1938 (special)
Tennessee	1	0	1	Marsha Blackburn	2019–present	2018
Texas	0	1	1	Kay Hutchison	1993–2013	1993 (special)
Utah	0	0	0			
Vermont	0	0	0			
Virginia	0	0	0			
Washington	2	0	2	Patty Murray	1993–present	1992
West Virginia	1	0	1	Shelley Moore Capito	2015–present	2014
Wisconsin	1	0	1	Tammy Baldwin	2013–present	2012
Wyoming	1	0	1	Cynthia Lummis	2021–present	2020
Total	27	38	65	Rebecca Felton	1922, 1931–1945, 1948–1973, 1978–present	1932

== Graphs ==
=== Histograph ===
Note: In the graph below, entry dates refer to the date the senator was sworn in, not the date of the appointment, or election.

Democratic Party · Republican Party · Independent

Starting	Total	Graph	Event
March 4, 1789	0		Beginning of the 1st United States Congress
November 21, 1922	1		▲ Rebecca Felton appointed
November 22, 1922	0		▼ End of Rebecca Felton's appointment
December 9, 1931	1		▲ Hattie Caraway appointed
January 31, 1936	2		▲ Rose Long appointed
January 3, 1937	1		▼ Rose Long retires
August 20, 1937	2		▲ Dixie Graves appointed
January 10, 1938	1		▼ End of Dixie Graves's appointment
November 9, 1938	2		▲ Gladys Pyle begins service
January 3, 1939	1		▼ Gladys Pyle retires
January 3, 1945	0		▼ Hattie Caraway ends service
October 6, 1948	1		▲ Vera C. Bushfield appointed
December 27, 1948	0		▼ End of Vera C. Bushfield's appointment
January 3, 1949	1		▲ Margaret Chase Smith begins service
April 16, 1954	2		▲ Eva Bowring appointed
November 7, 1954	1		▼ End of Eva Bowring's appointment
November 8, 1954	2		▲ Hazel Abel begins service
December 31, 1954	1		▼ Hazel Abel retires
November 9, 1960	2		▲ Maurine Neuberger begins service
January 3, 1967	1		▼ Maurine Neuberger retires
August 1, 1972	2		▲ Elaine Edwards appointed
November 13, 1972	1		▼ End of Elaine Edwards's appointment
January 3, 1973	0		▼ Margaret Chase Smith ends service
January 25, 1978	1		▲ Muriel Humphrey appointed
June 8, 1978	2		▲ Maryon Allen appointed
November 7, 1978	0		▼ End of Muriel Humphrey's and Maryon Allen's appointments
December 23, 1978	1		▲ Nancy Kassebaum begins service
January 1, 1981	2		▲ Paula Hawkins begins service
January 3, 1987	2		Barbara Mikulski begins service; Paula Hawkins ends service
September 16, 1992	3		▲ Jocelyn Burdick appointed
November 4, 1992	4		▲ Dianne Feinstein begins service
December 14, 1992	3		▼ End of Jocelyn Burdick's appointment
January 3, 1993	6		▲ Barbara Boxer, Carol Moseley Braun, and Patty Murray begin service
June 14, 1993	7		▲ Kay Hutchison begins service
January 3, 1995	8		▲ Olympia Snowe begins service
June 11, 1996	9		▲ Sheila Frahm appointed
November 6, 1996	8		▼ End of Sheila Frahm's appointment
January 3, 1997	9		▲ Susan Collins and Mary Landrieu begin service; Nancy Kassebaum retires
January 3, 1999	9		▲ Blanche Lincoln begins service; Carol Moseley Braun ends service
January 3, 2001	13		▲ Maria Cantwell, Hillary Clinton, and Debbie Stabenow begin service; Jean Carnahan appointed
November 23, 2002	12		▼ End of Jean Carnahan's appointment
December 20, 2002	13		▲ Lisa Murkowski appointed
January 3, 2003	14		▲ Elizabeth Dole begins service
January 3, 2007	16		▲ Amy Klobuchar and Claire McCaskill begin service
January 3, 2009	17		▲ Jeanne Shaheen and Kay Hagan begin service; Elizabeth Dole ends service
January 21, 2009	16		▼ Hillary Clinton resigns
January 26, 2009	17		▲ Kirsten Gillibrand appointed
January 3, 2011	17		Kelly Ayotte begins service; Blanche Lincoln ends service
January 3, 2013	20		▲ Tammy Baldwin, Deb Fischer, Heidi Heitkamp, Mazie Hirono, and Elizabeth Warren begin service; Kay Hutchison and Olympia Snowe retire
January 3, 2015	20		Shelley Moore Capito and Joni Ernst begin service; Kay Hagan and Mary Landrieu end service
January 3, 2017	21		▲ Catherine Cortez Masto, Tammy Duckworth, Kamala Harris, and Maggie Hassan begin service; Barbara Boxer and Barbara Mikulski retire; Kelly Ayotte ends service
January 3, 2018	22		▲ Tina Smith appointed
April 9, 2018	23		▲ Cindy Hyde Smith appointed
January 3, 2019	25		▲ Marsha Blackburn, Kyrsten Sinema, and Jacky Rosen begin service; Martha McSally appointed; Heidi Heitkamp and Claire McCaskill end service
January 6, 2020	26		▲ Kelly Loeffler appointed
December 2, 2020	25		▼ End of Martha McSally's appointment
January 3, 2021	26		▲ Cynthia Lummis begins service
January 18, 2021	25		▼ Kamala Harris resigns
January 20, 2021	24		▼ End of Kelly Loeffler's appointment
December 9, 2022	24		Kyrsten Sinema party change
January 3, 2023	25		▲ Katie Britt begins service
September 29, 2023	24		▼ Death of Dianne Feinstein
October 3, 2023	25		▲ Laphonza Butler appointed
December 8, 2024	24		▼ End of Laphonza Butler's appointment
January 3, 2025	25		▲ Angela Alsobrooks, Lisa Blunt Rochester, and Elissa Slotkin begin service; Debbie Stabenow and Kyrsten Sinema retire
January 21, 2025	26		▲ Ashley Moody appointed
July 14, 2026	27		▲ Darline Graham appointed
January 3, 2027	26		▼ Annie Andrews, Peggy Flanagan, Harriet Hageman, Julia Letlow, Mary Peltola, and Juliana Stratton to begin service; Joni Ernst, Cynthia Lummis, Jeanne Shaheen, and Tina Smith to retire; Cindy Hyde-Smith and Susan Collins to end service; end of Darline Graham's appointment

== Concurrently serving women from the same state ==
Currently serving

State	Start date	End date	Duration	Senior senator	Junior senator
California	January 3, 1993	January 18, 2021	10,242 days (28 years, 15 days)	Dianne Feinstein (D)	Barbara Boxer (D) (January 3, 1993 – January 3, 2017), 8,766 days (24 years, 0 days)
California	January 3, 1993	January 18, 2021	10,242 days (28 years, 15 days)	Dianne Feinstein (D)	Kamala Harris (D) (January 3, 2017 – January 18, 2021), 1,476 days (4 years, 15 days)
Kansas	June 11, 1996	November 6, 1996	148 days	Nancy Kassebaum (R)	Sheila Frahm (R)
Maine	January 3, 1997	January 3, 2013	5,844 days (16 years, 0 days)	Olympia Snowe (R)	Susan Collins (R)
Washington	January 3, 2001	Present	9,453 days (25 years, 322 days)	Patty Murray (D)	Maria Cantwell (D)
New Hampshire	January 3, 2011	Present	5,801 days (15 years, 322 days)	Jeanne Shaheen (D)	Kelly Ayotte (R) (January 3, 2011 – January 3, 2017), 2,192 days (6 years, 0 days)
New Hampshire	January 3, 2011	Present	5,801 days (15 years, 322 days)	Jeanne Shaheen (D)	Maggie Hassan (D) (January 3, 2017–present), 3,609 days (9 years, 322 days)
Minnesota	January 3, 2018	Present	3,244 days (8 years, 322 days)	Amy Klobuchar (DFL)	Tina Smith (DFL)
Nevada	January 3, 2019	Present	2,879 days (7 years, 322 days)	Catherine Cortez Masto (D)	Jacky Rosen (D)
Arizona	January 3, 2019	December 2, 2020	699 days (1 year, 334 days)	Kyrsten Sinema (D)	Martha McSally (R)

== Elections with two female major-party nominees ==
Incumbent senators (at the time of the election in question) are in bold.

Elections with two female major-party nominees
Election year	State	Winner	Second-place finisher
1960	Maine	**Margaret Chase Smith**	Lucia Cormier
1986	Maryland	Barbara Mikulski	Linda Chavez
1998	Washington	**Patty Murray**	Linda Smith
2002	Louisiana	**Mary Landrieu**	Suzanne Haik Terrell
2002	Maine (2)	**Susan Collins**	Chellie Pingree
2006	Maine (3)	**Olympia Snowe**	Jean Hay Bright
2006	Texas	**Kay Bailey Hutchison**	Barbara Ann Radnofsky
2008	North Carolina	Kay Hagan	**Elizabeth Dole**
2010	California	**Barbara Boxer**	Carly Fiorina
2012	California (2)	**Dianne Feinstein**	Elizabeth Emken
2012	Hawaii	Mazie Hirono	Linda Lingle
2012	New York	**Kirsten Gillibrand**	Wendy Long
2014	Maine (4)	**Susan Collins**	Shenna Bellows
2014	West Virginia	Shelley Moore Capito	Natalie Tennant
2016	California (3)	Kamala Harris	Loretta Sanchez
2016	New Hampshire	Maggie Hassan	**Kelly Ayotte**
2018	Arizona	Kyrsten Sinema	Martha McSally
2018	Minnesota	**Tina Smith**	Karin Housley
2018	Nebraska	**Deb Fischer**	Jane Raybould
2018	New York (2)	**Kirsten Gillibrand**	Chele Farley
2018	Washington (2)	**Maria Cantwell**	Susan Hutchison
2018	Wisconsin	**Tammy Baldwin**	Leah Vukmir
2020	Iowa	**Joni Ernst**	Theresa Greenfield
2020	Maine (5)	**Susan Collins**	Sara Gideon
2020	West Virginia (2)	**Shelley Moore Capito**	Paula Jean Swearengin
2020	Wyoming	Cynthia Lummis	Merav Ben-David
2022	Alaska	**Lisa Murkowski**	Kelly Tshibaka
2022	Illinois	**Tammy Duckworth**	Kathy Salvi
2022	Washington (3)	**Patty Murray**	Tiffany Smiley
2024	Tennessee	**Marsha Blackburn**	Gloria Johnson
2026	Florida	**Ashley Moody**	Angie Nixon
2026	Minnesota (2)	Peggy Flanagan	Michele Tafoya
2026	South Carolina	Annie Andrews	**Darline Graham**
2026	West Virginia (3)	**Shelley Moore Capito**	Rachel Fetty Anderson

== See also ==
- List of female governors in the United States
- Party leaders of the United States Senate
- Politics of the United States
- Sexism in American political elections
- Widow's succession
- Women in the United States House of Representatives
