= Paula Hawkins (politician) =

American politician (1927–2009)

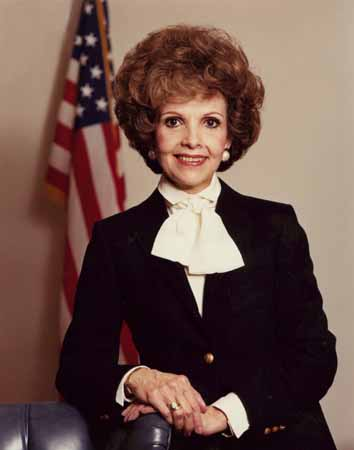

United States Senator from Florida
- In office January 1, 1981 – January 3, 1987
- Preceded by: Richard Stone
- Succeeded by: Bob Graham

Member of the Florida Public Service Commission
- In office 1972–1980

Personal details
- Born: Paula Fickes; January 24, 1927 Salt Lake City, Utah, U.S.
- Died: December 4, 2009 (aged 82) Winter Park, Florida, U.S.
- Resting place: Palm Cemetery
- Party: Republican
- Spouse: Gene Hawkins (m. 1947)
- Children: 3
- Education: Utah State University (BA)

Paula Hawkins (née Fickes; January 24, 1927 – December 4, 2009) was an American politician and community activist who represented the state of Florida in the United States Senate from 1981 to 1987. A member of the Republican Party, she was Florida's first female U.S. senator. She was the first woman elected to a full Senate term without being the daughter or wife of a politician, and the second woman ever elected to the Senate from the American South. She was also the first Mormon woman elected to the Senate.

Born in Utah and raised primarily in Georgia, Hawkins moved to Florida in 1955. After beginning her career as a community activist and Republican volunteer, she was elected statewide to the Florida Public Service Commission in 1972 and re-elected in 1976. In 1974, Hawkins was the runner-up in the Republican primary for U.S. Senate. In 1978, she was the Republican nominee for lieutenant governor; selected as the running mate of businessman Jack Eckerd. In the 1980 U.S. Senate election, Hawkins defeated Democratic nominee and Florida state treasurer Bill Gunter, becoming only the second Republican elected to the senate from Florida since Reconstruction. Her predecessor, Richard Stone, resigned from the senate early and Hawkins was appointed by Governor Bob Graham to fill the remaining three days of his term. During Hawkins's tenure in the Senate, she supported the policies of President Ronald Reagan and was particularly active in the realm of child welfare. In 1986, she was defeated for re-election by incumbent Democratic governor Bob Graham.

After leaving the Senate, Hawkins remained active in the American conservative movement and served as U.S. representative to the Inter-American Drug Abuse Control Commission from 1990 to 1997. She suffered long-term back pain due to an automotive accident, and was partially paralyzed in 1998 as the result of a severe stroke. On December 4, 2009, Hawkins died in Winter Park, Florida, due to complications from a fall, at the age of 82. In 2010, she was honored as a "Great Floridian" by Governor Charlie Crist.

== Early years ==
Hawkins was the eldest of three children born to Paul and Leone Fickes in Salt Lake City, Utah. Her father was a Naval Chief Warrant Officer. In 1934, the family moved to Atlanta, Georgia, where her father taught at Georgia Tech. Her parents split when Paula was in high school, and Leone and the children returned to Utah. She finished high school at Richmond, Utah in 1944, then enrolled at Utah State University. Paula was hired to be the Athletic director's secretary and met her future husband. On September 5, 1947, Paula Fickes and Walter Eugene Hawkins were married and moved to Atlanta. Gene earned a degree in electrical engineering and eventually opened his own business. The couple had three children before moving in 1955 to Winter Park, Florida, where Paula became a community activist and Republican volunteer.

== Politics ==
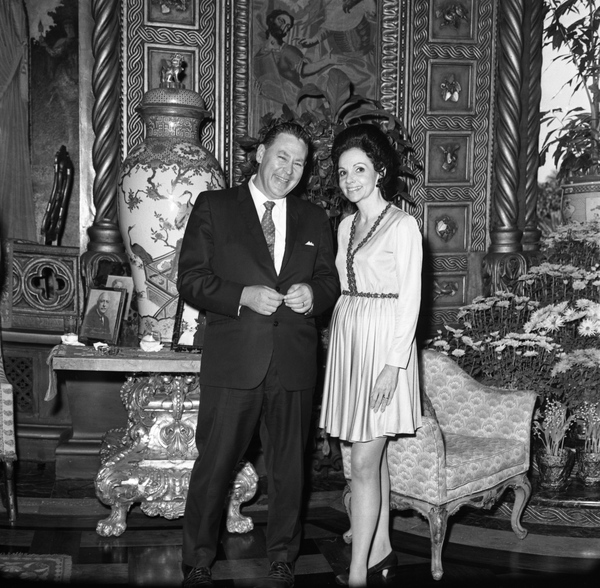
Hawkins with Florida GOP chair Duke Crittenden at Mar-a-Lago, 1970

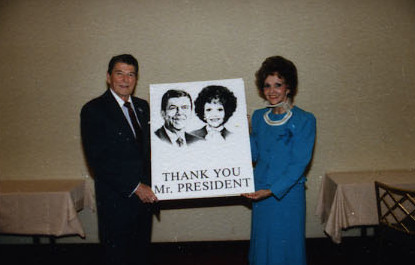
Hawkins with President Ronald Reagan in 1986

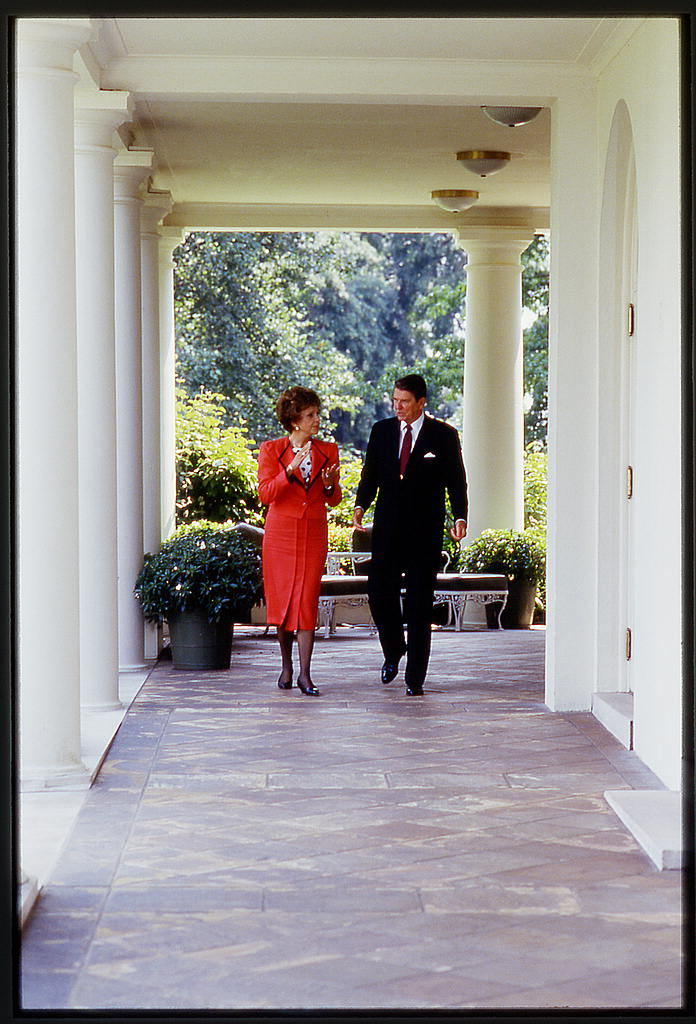
Hawkins with President Ronald Reagan in 1986

She began her electoral career by campaigning as a consumer advocate. She became the first woman elected to statewide office in Florida by winning a seat on the Florida Public Service Commission in 1972. Hawkins was an unsuccessful candidate for the Republican nomination for the U.S. Senate in 1974, which was won by Jack Eckerd. She was reelected to the Public Services Commission in 1976. In 1978, she was the Republican candidate for Lieutenant Governor on the ticket headed by Jack Eckerd. They lost to State Sen. Bob Graham and State Rep. Wayne Mixson. In 1980, she was elected to the United States Senate representing Florida, becoming Florida's first woman elected to the United States Senate and the fifth from the South.

=== U.S. Senate ===
In 1980, she defeated former Congressman Bill Gunter to win election to the United States Senate; she was Florida's first woman elected to the United States Senate and only the fifth from the South.

Outgoing Senator Richard Stone resigned three days before his term ended, and Bob Graham as Governor of Florida nominated Hawkins to fill the two-day vacancy, giving her seniority over the other freshmen senators. She was the first woman senator to bring her husband to Washington, D.C. As a result, the Senate Wives' Club became known as the Senate Spouses' Club.

Hawkins was particularly active in the realm of child welfare. She was a key figure in advocating and passing the 1982 Missing Children's Act, and in 1983 chaired the Investigation and Oversight Subcommittee of the Senate Labor and Human Resources Committee, where she launched an investigation of the increase of children reported missing. In 1984 she spoke at the Third National Conference on Sexual Victimization of Children, where she stunned listeners by disclosing that she herself had been the victim of sexual abuse as a child. She subsequently authored Children at Risk, My Fight Against Child Abuse: A Personal Story and a Public Plea, which was published in 1986.

In 1984, she was co-chairwoman of the platform committee at the RNC.

Senator Hawkins, in 1985, participated in the Record Label Hearings of the Senate's Commerce Committee, where the issue of labeling musical songs was examined, after the Parents Music Resource Center initiative. During the hearings, Hawkins had a notable altercation with testifying musician Frank Zappa, who eventually invited the senator to his home to see first-hand "what kind of toys" his children are playing with.

Hawkins was known during her tenure for saying and doing things many considered bizarre. She was most infamous during her first year in office for hosting a luncheon in an ornate Senate dining room of New York sirloin steak, tossed salad, baked potatoes, fresh asparagus, hot apple pie, and fresh strawberries and other citrus in which she railed against the "truly greedy" and proposed mandatory jail time for food stamp cheaters. Critics dubbed it the "steak and jail" luncheon (a pun on Steak and Ale).

Hawkins once again faced Bob Graham on a statewide ballot when she campaigned for re-election to the Senate in 1986. Graham defeated her by 55% to 45%, the largest margin of defeat for an incumbent senator in 1986.

== Post-Washington activities ==
Hawkins returned to Winter Park in early 1987. She was United States representative to the Organization of American States' Inter-American Drug Abuse Control Commission (CICAD) for seven years before leaving active politics. She remained involved behind the scenes in central Florida and her endorsement was sought by many candidates. Hawkins was named a director of Philip Crosby Associates in 1988. She joined the board of Nu Skin Enterprises in 1997. She was a lifelong member of the Church of Jesus Christ of Latter-day Saints.

== Health ==
In a freak accident, a television studio partition toppled and struck her in early January 1982 during an interview at WESH-TV in Winter Park, Florida. While not life-threatening, the mishap aggravated a back injury she had suffered years before in an automobile collision and caused constant pain which plagued her during her years in Washington. Senator Strom Thurmond, in his capacity as president pro tempore, gave her the use of a room in the Capitol building for a hospital bed where she found pain relief under weighted traction during breaks between congressional activities.

Hawkins' right side was paralyzed in 1998 as the result of a severe stroke. After this, she used a wheelchair. She stayed active, appearing on October 1, 2009, at the opening ceremony of the Waldorf Astoria Orlando at Walt Disney World.

=== Death ===
Hawkins died at the age of 82 on December 4, 2009, of complications from a fall she suffered the previous day. She is buried at Palm Cemetery in Winter Park.

== Electoral history ==
1978 Florida gubernatorial election
Party	Candidate	Votes	%	±%
Democratic	Bob Graham/ Wayne Mixson	1,406,580	55.59%	
Republican	Jack Eckerd/ Paula Hawkins	1,123,888	44.41%	
Majority		282,692	11.18%	
Turnout		2,530,468	100.00%	
Democratic hold		Swing		

1980 U.S. Senate (Florida) Republican primary results
Party	Candidate	Votes	%	±%
Republican	Paula Hawkins	209,856	48.14%	
Republican	Louis Frey Jr.	119,834	27.49%	
Republican	Ander Crenshaw	54,767	12.56%	
Republican	Ellis Rubin	19,990	4.59%	
Republican	John T. Ware	18,118	1.64%	
Republican	Lewis Dinkins	15,174	3.48%	
Total votes		435,962	100.00%	

1980 U.S. Senate (Florida) Republican primary runoff results
Party	Candidate	Votes	%
Republican	Paula Hawkins	293,600	61.61%
Republican	Louis Frey Jr.	182,911	38.39%
Total votes		476,511	100.00%

1980 U.S. Senate (Florida) general election results
Party	Candidate	Votes	%	±%
Republican	Paula Hawkins	1,822,460	51.66%	+10.74%
Democratic	Bill Gunter	1,705,409	48.34%	+4.96%
Write-ins		159	0.00%	
Majority		117,051	3.32%	+0.85%
Turnout		3,528,028		
Republican gain from Democratic		Swing		

== See also ==
- Women in the United States Senate

Party political offices
Preceded by Mike Thompson	Republican nominee for Lieutenant Governor of Florida; 1978	Succeeded by Leo Callahan
Preceded by Jack Eckerd	Republican nominee for U.S. Senator from Florida (Class 3); 1980, 1986	Succeeded by Bill Grant
U.S. Senate
Preceded by Richard Stone	U.S. Senator (Class 3) from Florida; 1981–1987; Served alongside: Lawton Chiles	Succeeded by Bob Graham
