= Bill Gunter =

American politician (1934–2024)

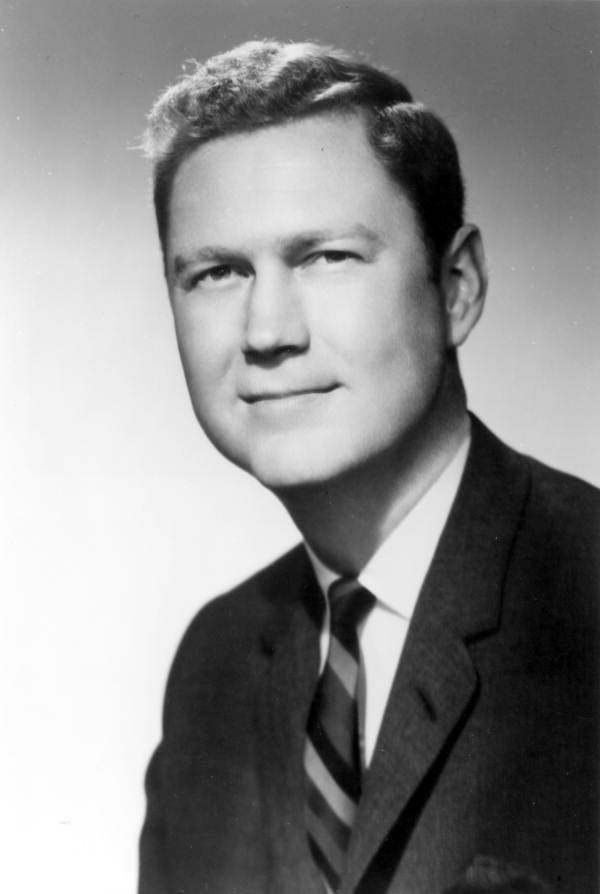
- Gunter in 1969

21st Treasurer, Insurance Commissioner, and Fire Marshal of Florida
- In office November 9, 1976 – January 3, 1989
- Governor: Reubin Askew; Bob Graham; Wayne Mixson; Bob Martinez
- Preceded by: Philip F. Ashler
- Succeeded by: Tom Gallagher

Member of the U.S. House of Representatives from Florida's 5th district
- In office January 3, 1973 – January 3, 1975
- Preceded by: New Constituency (Redistricting)
- Succeeded by: Richard Kelly

Member of the Florida Senate from the 18th district
- In office November 8, 1966 – November 7, 1972
- Preceded by: John Mathews Jr.
- Succeeded by: John T. Ware

Personal details
- Born: William Dawson Gunter Jr. July 16, 1934 Jacksonville, Florida, U.S.
- Died: April 8, 2024 (aged 89) Tallahassee, Florida, U.S.
- Party: Democratic
- Education: University of Florida (BSA)

Military service
- Allegiance: United States
- Branch/service: United States Army
- Years of service: 1957-1958

William Dawson Gunter Jr. (July 16, 1934 – April 8, 2024) was an American politician from the state of Florida. From 1973 to 1975, he served one term in the U.S. House of Representatives. He then served 12 years in statewide elected office as Treasurer, Insurance Commissioner, and Fire Marshal of Florida.

== Early life and education ==
Gunter was born in Jacksonville in 1934. He attended public schools in Live Oak and received his Bachelor of Science in Agriculture (B.S.A.) from the University of Florida in 1956. While a student at Florida, he was a member of the Sigma Alpha Epsilon fraternity (Florida Upsilon chapter). Gunter briefly attended the University of Georgia in 1957 and served in the United States Army from 1957 to 1958.

== Political career ==
Gunter was a member of the Florida State Senate in 1966. He was elected as a Democrat to the United States House of Representatives as the first member from Florida's 5th congressional district, a newly created district in the Orlando area, in the 1972 election. He only served a single term. His voting record in the 93rd Congress was generally moderate.

=== Senate campaigns ===
Gunter unsuccessfully sought the Democratic nomination for the U.S. Senate in 1974, but lost the primary to Richard Stone. He was elected Florida State Treasurer and Insurance Commissioner in 1976 and served in this post until 1988.

In 1980, Gunter ran again for the U.S. Senate, defeating incumbent Senator Stone in the Democratic primary. He then faced the Republican nominee Paula Hawkins, who had been the Republican nominee for lieutenant governor in the 1978 gubernatorial election. Gunter lost to Hawkins, who won 51.7 percent of the vote to Gunter's 48.3 percent. Gunter's loss was one of twelve Republican pickups in 1980, which produced a Republican majority in the Senate for the first time since 1954.

Gunter made a final U.S. Senate bid in 1988, narrowly losing the Democratic nomination to Buddy MacKay, who went on to lose the general election to Connie Mack III.

== Post-politics ==
Gunter worked at Rogers, Gunter, Vaughn, a Tallahassee-based insurance agency and had been active in related trade associations and lobbying for the industry.

Gunter died at his home in Tallahassee on April 8, 2024, at the age of 89.

Florida Senate
Preceded by John E. Mathews Jr.	Member of the Florida Senate from the 18th district 1966–1972	Succeeded by John T. Ware
U.S. House of Representatives
Preceded by Lou Frey	Member of the U.S. House of Representatives from Florida's 5th congressional district 1973–1975	Succeeded by Richard Kelly
Party political offices
Preceded by Thomas D. O'Malley Jr.	Democratic nominee for Treasurer, Insurance Commissioner, and Fire Marshal of Florida; 1976, 1978, 1982, 1986	Succeeded by Ken Jenne
Preceded by Richard Stone	Democratic Party nominee for United States Senator from Florida (Class 3); 1980	Succeeded by Bob Graham
