= Palm Cemetery =

Historic cemetery in Florida, US

- Interactive map of Palm Cemetery

Details
- Established: 1906
- Location: Winter Park, Florida
- Country: United States
- Coordinates: 28°36′17″N 81°21′16″W
- Owned by: City of Winter Park
- Find a Grave: Palm Cemetery

Palm Cemetery is a historic cemetery located in Winter Park, Florida, United States. It is the city's oldest cemetery and is currently maintained by the city's department of Parks and Recreation.

== History ==
Palm Cemetery is the oldest cemetery in Winter Park, Florida and has been continuously operating since 1906. It was founded on 17-acres of land donated by Winter Park co-founder Loring Chase.

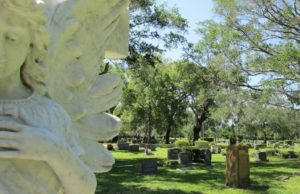
Gravesites of Palm Cemetery

In 2013, the cemetery discovered hundreds of unused graves sold decades prior. They later re-sold the plots that remained unclaimed.

23 mayors of Winter Park are buried in the cemetery.

== Notable burials ==
- Edward Gurney, U.S. senator from Florida, mayor of Winter Park
- Paula Hawkins, U.S. senator from Florida, Florida Public Service Commissioner
- Loring Augustus Chase, co-founder of Winter Park
- Jeannette Genius McKean, painter and interior decorator
- James Gamble Rogers II, architect
- Albin Polasek, sculptor and educator

== See also ==
- List of cemeteries in the United States
- List of cemeteries in Florida
