= 1980 United States Senate election in Florida =

- November 4, 1980
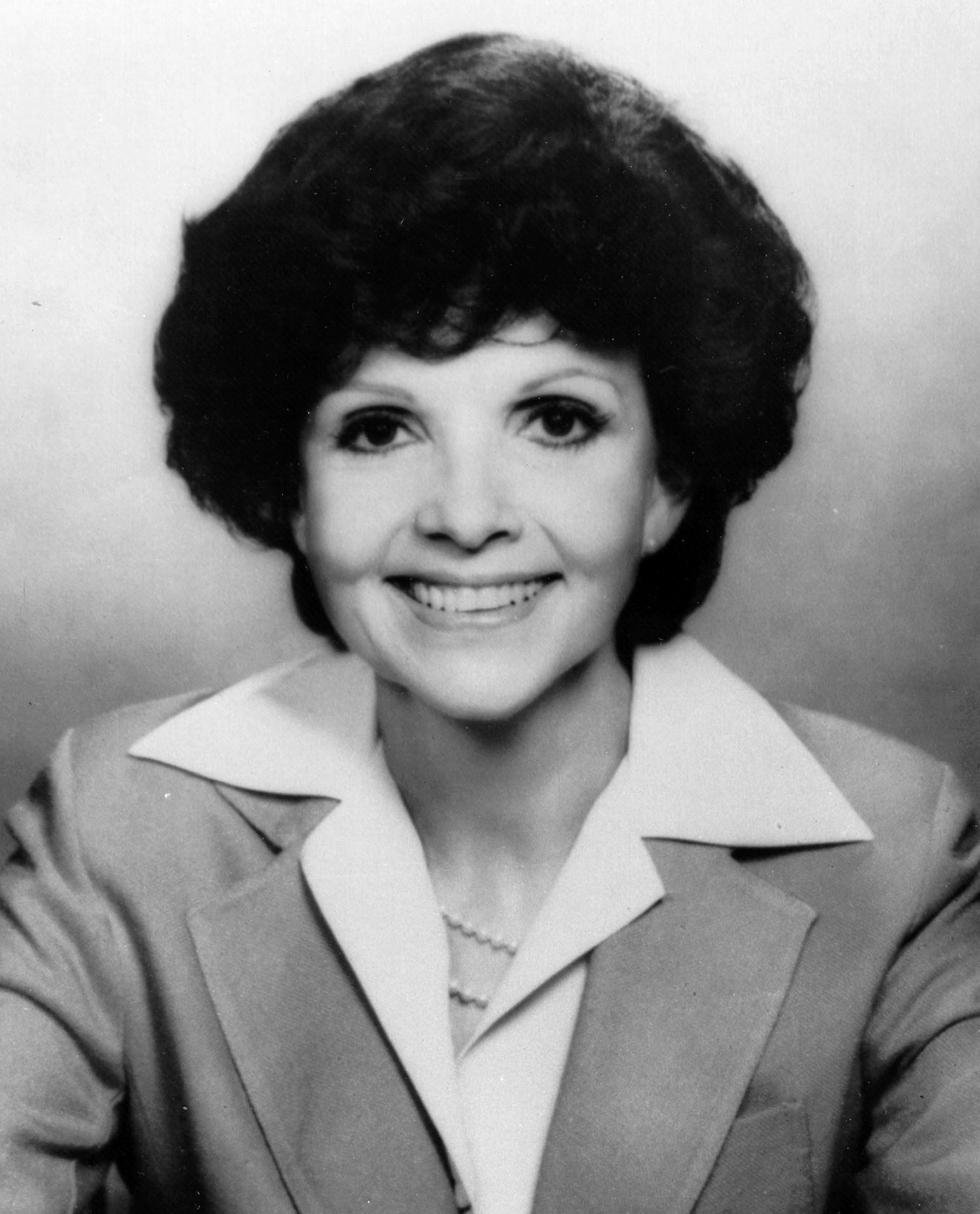

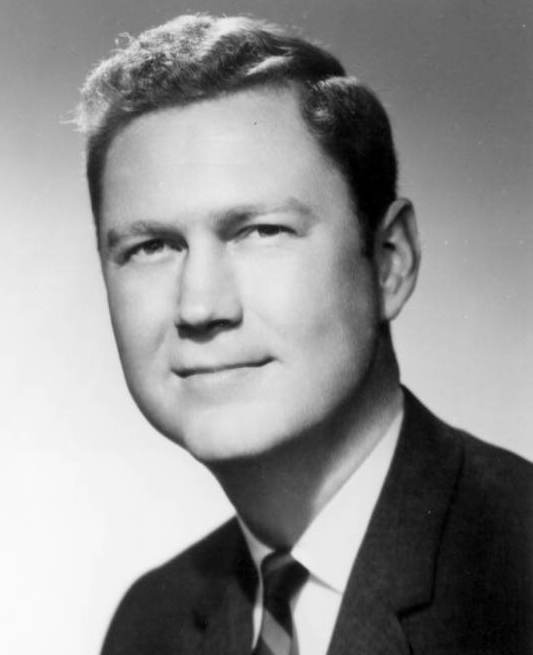
Nominee	Paula Hawkins	Bill Gunter
Party	Republican	Democratic
Popular vote	1,822,460	1,705,409
Percentage	51.66%	48.34%
- County results Hawkins: 50–60% 60–70% Gunter: 50–60% 60–70% 70–80%
U.S. senator before election
Richard Stone
Democratic
Elected U.S. Senator
Paula Hawkins
Republican

The 1980 United States Senate election in Florida took place on November 4, 1980, alongside other elections for President of the United States as well as to the United States Senate in other states and elections to the United States House of Representatives and various state and local elections. Incumbent Democratic U.S. Senator Richard Stone ran for re-election to a second term, but lost the Democratic primary election to Bill Gunter.

Republican Paula Hawkins defeated Gunter in the general election. Hawkins became the first woman elected to the U.S. Senate in the state's history and the first female U.S. Senator elected on a full term without political family connections.

== Democratic primary ==
=== Candidates ===
- John B. Coffey
- Bill Gunter, Florida State Treasurer and former U.S. Representative
- Buddy MacKay, State Senator
- James L. Miller
- Richard A. Pettigrew
- Richard Stone, incumbent U.S. Senator

=== Campaign ===
Stone, a freshman senator, had a reputation for changing his mind. In 1980, the AFL-CIO actively campaigned against him, and Stone was deemed vulnerable in his re-election bid. Six Democrats entered the race for Stone's seat including his 1974 runoff opponent Bill Gunter who was Florida State Treasurer/Insurance Commissioner in 1980. As was the case in 1974, Stone and Gunter were forced into a runoff but, unlike 1974, Gunter won the nomination.

=== Endorsements ===
Bill Gunter

Newspapers

- St. Petersburg Times (Democratic primary only)
Richard Stone

Newspapers

- The Bradenton Herald (Democratic primary only)
- The Florida Times-Union and Jacksonville Journal (Democratic primary only)
- The Ledger (Democratic primary only)
- The Post (Democratic primary only)'
- Sarasota Journal (Democratic primary only)

=== Results ===
Democratic primary results
Party	Candidate	Votes	%
Democratic	Richard Stone (incumbent)	355,287	32.08%
Democratic	Bill Gunter	335,859	30.33%
Democratic	Buddy MacKay	272,538	24.61%
Democratic	Richard A. Pettigrew	108,154	9.77%
Democratic	James L. Miller	18,118	1.64%
Democratic	John B. Coffey	17,410	1.57%
Total votes		1,107,366	100.00%

Democratic primary runoff results
Party	Candidate	Votes	%
Democratic	Bill Gunter	594,676	51.76%
Democratic	Richard Stone (incumbent)	554,268	48.24%
Total votes		1,148,944	100.00%

== Republican primary ==
=== Candidates ===
- Ander Crenshaw, former state representative
- Lewis Dinkins
- Lou Frey, former U.S. Representative
- Paula Hawkins, Florida Public Service Commissioner
- Ellis Rubin, criminal defense attorney
- John T. Ware, State Senator

=== Endorsements ===
Lou Frey

Newspapers

- The Bradenton Herald (Republican primary only)
- The Post (Republican primary only)'
- The Florida Times-Union and Jacksonville Journal (Republican primary only)
- The Ledger (Republican primary only)
- Sarasota Journal (Republican primary only)
Paula Hawkins

Newspapers

- St. Petersburg Times (Republican primary only)

=== Results ===
Republican primary results
Party	Candidate	Votes	%
Republican	Paula Hawkins	209,856	48.14%
Republican	Lou Frey	119,834	27.49%
Republican	Ander Crenshaw	54,767	12.56%
Republican	Ellis Rubin	19,990	4.59%
Republican	John T. Ware	16,341	3.75%
Republican	Lewis Dinkins	15,174	3.48%
Total votes		435,962	100.00%

Republican primary runoff results
Party	Candidate	Votes	%
Republican	Paula Hawkins	293,600	61.61%
Republican	Lou Frey	182,911	38.39%
Total votes		476,511	100.00%

== General election ==
=== Candidates ===
- Bill Gunter (D), Florida State Treasurer and former U.S. Congressman
- Paula Hawkins (R), Florida Public Service Commissioner

=== Results ===
General election results
Party	Candidate	Votes	%	±%
Republican	Paula Hawkins	1,822,460	51.66%	+10.74%
Democratic	Bill Gunter	1,705,409	48.34%	+4.96%
Write-in		0	0.00%	N/A
Total votes		3,528,028	100.00%	N/A
Republican gain from Democratic				

== See also ==
- 1980 United States Senate elections
