= Neal Justin =

American politician and professor (1936–2025)

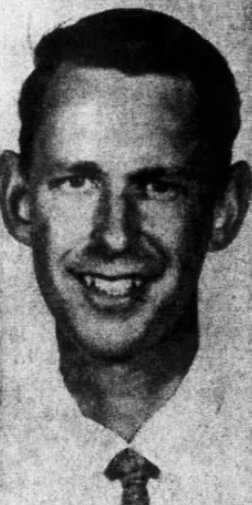
- Justin in 1964

Member of the Arizona House of Representatives
- In office 1965–1966

Personal details
- Born: Neal Eric Justin; May 9, 1936 Argyle, New York, U.S.
- Died: July 2, 2025 (aged 89) Tucson, Arizona, U.S.
- Party: Democratic
- Education: Florida Southern College; University of Arizona
- Occupation: Professor

Neal Eric Justin (May 9, 1936 – July 2, 2025) was an American politician and professor. A member of the Democratic Party, he served in the Arizona House of Representatives from 1965 to 1966.

== Life and career ==
Justin was born in Argyle, New York, the son of Miss Justin. He attended Florida Southern College, earning his BA degree in social science in 1959. He also attended the University of Arizona, earning his master's degree in education in 1964, which after earning his degrees, he worked as a teacher at Amphitheater Junior High School.

Justin served in the Arizona House of Representatives from 1965 to 1966. After his service in the House, he served as a professor in the department of education at Florida Atlantic University from 1969 to 1979. During his years as a professor, in 1974, he ran as a Democratic candidate for United States Senator of Florida. He received 14,961 votes, but failed to qualify in the Democratic primary runoff election, leading to Richard Stone to win the general election.

== Death ==
Justin died in Tucson, Arizona on July 2, 2025, at the age of 89.
