= Edward Elson =

Edward Elson may refer to:

- Edward L. R. Elson, Presbyterian minister and Chaplain of the United States Senate
- Edward Elliot Elson, American ambassador
