= Bill Frenzel =

American politician (1928–2014)

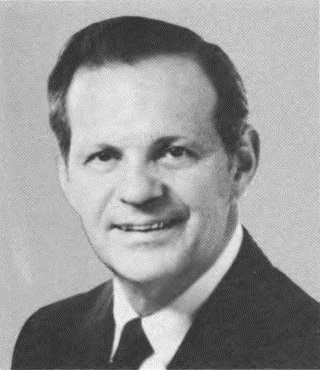

Chair of the House Republican Research Committee
- In office January 3, 1977 – January 3, 1979
- Leader: John Jacob Rhodes
- Preceded by: Lou Frey
- Succeeded by: Trent Lott

Member of the U.S. House of Representatives from Minnesota's 3rd district
- In office January 3, 1971 – January 3, 1991
- Preceded by: Clark MacGregor
- Succeeded by: Jim Ramstad

Member of the Minnesota House of Representatives from the 30A district
- In office January 3, 1967 – January 4, 1971
- Preceded by: Himself (30th district)
- Succeeded by: Julian Hook

Member of the Minnesota House of Representatives from the 30th district
- In office January 8, 1963 – January 3, 1967
- Preceded by: Douglas Head; Sally Luther
- Succeeded by: Himself (30A district); Robert J. McFarlin (30B district)

Personal details
- Born: William Eldridge Frenzel; July 31, 1928 St. Paul, Minnesota, U.S.
- Died: November 17, 2014 (aged 86) McLean, Virginia, U.S.
- Party: Republican
- Spouse: Ruth Purdy (m. 1951)
- Children: 3
- Education: Dartmouth College (BA, MBA)

Military service
- Branch/service: United States Navy
- Years of service: 1951–1954
- Rank: Lieutenant
- Unit: United States Navy Reserve
- Battles/wars: Korean War

William Eldridge Frenzel (July 31, 1928 – November 17, 2014) was an American politician and businessman who represented Minnesota's 3rd congressional district in the United States House of Representatives from 1971 to 1991. A member of the Republican Party, Frenzel previously served in the Minnesota House of Representatives from 1963 to 1971.

== Early life and career ==
Frenzel was educated at the Saint Paul Academy in Saint Paul, Minnesota, and earned both a B.A. (1950) and M.B.A (1951) from Dartmouth College. He served as a lieutenant in the United States Naval Reserve during the Korean War from 1951 to 1954.

Frenzel served eight years in the Minnesota House of Representatives from 1962 to 1970, prior to serving in the U.S. Congress. He was president of the No. Waterway Terminals Corp. (1965–70) and of Minneapolis Terminal Warehouse Company (1966–1970). He was a member of the executive committee for Hennepin County, Minnesota (1966–1967).

== House of Representatives ==
Frenzel was elected as a Republican to the 92nd, 93rd, 94th, 95th, 96th, 97th, 98th, 99th, 100th, and 101st congresses, serving from January 3, 1971, to January 3, 1991, and was the ranking Republican on the House Budget Committee and a member of the influential Ways and Means Committee. He was a Congressional Representative to the General Agreement on Tariffs and Trade (GATT) in Geneva for 15 years. Frenzel became known as an expert in budget and fiscal policy, election law, trade, taxes and congressional procedures, and was a negotiator in the 1990 budget summit. During the Iran–Iraq War of the 1980s, Frenzel was a proponent of economic ties to the regime of Saddam Hussein, and opposed congressional efforts to condemn Iraqi war crimes such as the infamous Halabja chemical attack, the deadliest chemical-weapons attack in history, on the grounds that they would disrupt future trade with Iraq. He also served as vice chairman of the Committee on House Administration, and vice chairman of the Commission on Congressional Mailing Standards. He did not run for re-election to the House in 1990.

== Post-Congressional career ==
Frenzel was chairman of the Ripon Society, a Republican think-tank, from the 1990s until March 2004. He was a Guest Scholar at the Brookings Institution in Washington, D.C., starting January 1991, and was named director of the Brookings Governmental Affairs Institute on July 18, 1997.

President Bill Clinton appointed Frenzel (1993) to help sell the North American Free Trade Agreement.

In 2001, President George W. Bush appointed him to a commission to study the Social Security system, and, in 2002, to the Advisory Committee on Trade Policy and Negotiations (ACTPN), which he chairs. He was interviewed on NPR's All Things Considered, on December 20, 2004, as an advocate of President Bush's plan for Social Security privatization.

At the time of his death, he was chairman of the Pew Commission on Children in Foster Care, the vice chairman of the Eurasia Foundation, chairman of the Japan-America Society of Washington, chairman of the U.S. Steering Committee of the Transatlantic Policy Network, co-chairman of the Center for Strategic Tax Reform, co-chairman of the Bretton Woods Committee, co-chairman of the Committee For A Responsible Federal Budget, a member of the executive committee of the Committee on U.S.-China Relations, and chairman of the executive committee of the International Tax and Investment Center.

He was an alternate board member of the Office of Congressional Ethics (as of 2011.)

== Policy opinions ==
=== On political gridlock ===
Frenzel wrote in 1995:

There are some of us who think gridlock is the best thing since indoor plumbing. Gridlock is the natural gift the Framers of the Constitution gave us so that the country would not be subjected to policy swings resulting from the whimsy of the public. And the competition – whether multi-branch, multi-level, or multi-house – is important to those checks and balances and to our ongoing kind of centrist government. Thank heaven we do not have a government that nationalizes one year and privatizes next year, and so on ad infinitum.

(Checks and Balances, 8)

The historian of the Republican party, Geoffrey Kabaservice has identified Frenzel as a key moderate Republican within the post-war GOP.

== Family and personal life ==
Frenzel and his wife Ruth had three daughters. In 2000, he was awarded the Order of the Rising Sun, Gold and Silver Star, by the Emperor of Japan. In 2002, he received an Honorary Doctor of Laws Degree from Hamline University.

In 1984, the National Coalition for Science and Technology named him a "friend of science."

== Death ==
Frenzel died of cancer on November 17, 2014, in McLean, Virginia.

U.S. House of Representatives
Preceded by Clark MacGregor	Member of the U.S. House of Representatives from Minnesota's 3rd congressional district 1971–1991	Succeeded by Jim Ramstad
Preceded by William L. Dickinson	Ranking Member of the House Administration Committee; 1981–1989	Succeeded by Newt Gingrich
Preceded by Del Latta	Ranking Member of the House Budget Committee; 1989–1991	Succeeded by Bill Gradison
Party political offices
Preceded by Lou Frey	Chair of the House Republican Research Committee; 1977–1979	Succeeded by Trent Lott
