= 1978 Florida gubernatorial election =

- November 7, 1978
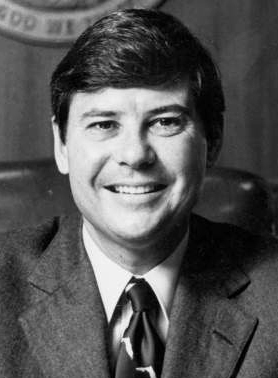

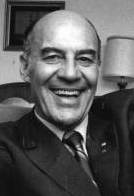
Nominee	Bob Graham	Jack Eckerd
Party	Democratic	Republican
Running mate	Wayne Mixson	Paula Hawkins
Popular vote	1,406,580	1,123,888
Percentage	55.59%	44.41%
- County results Graham: 50–60% 60–70% 70–80% 80–90% Eckerd: 50–60% 60–70%
Governor before election
Reubin Askew
Democratic
Elected Governor
Bob Graham
Democratic

The 1978 Florida gubernatorial election was held on November 7, 1978. Democratic nominee Bob Graham was elected, defeating Republican nominee Jack Eckerd with 55.59% of the vote.

== Primary elections ==
Primary elections were held on September 12, 1978. The Democratic runoff was held on October 5, 1978.

=== Democratic primary ===
==== Candidates ====
- Leroy Eden, bar owner
  - Maria Kay
- Bob Graham, Florida state senator from Miami Lakes
  - Wayne Mixson, state representative from Marianna
- Claude R. Kirk Jr., 36th governor of Florida
  - Mary L. Singleton, former director of the Florida Division of Elections and Jacksonville City Council member
- Robert Shevin, 31st Florida attorney general
  - Jim Glisson, state senator from Tavares
- Bruce A. Smathers, 18th secretary of state of Florida
  - Charles W. Boyd, state representative from Hollywood
- Hans Tanzler, mayor of Jacksonville
  - Manuel "Manolo" Arques, Miami real estate and insurance executive
- James H. Williams, 11th lieutenant governor of Florida
  - Betty Castor, state senator from Tampa

Seven tickets ran for the Democratic nomination for governor of Florida.

Jim Williams, the lieutenant governor, ran for governor with former Florida state senator Betty Castor of Tampa, as his running mate. Hans G. Tanzler, the mayor of Jacksonville, ran with Manuel "Manolo" Arques, a Cuban-American real estate and insurance executive from Miami. Florida secretary of state Bruce Smathers (who resigned to run) ran with state representative Charles W. Boyd.

Claude R. Kirk Jr. of Palm Beach, who was the Republican governor of Florida from 1967 to 1971, returned to the party he left 18 years prior, switching his party affiliation to Democratic on July 5, 1978 (the month prior re-registering as an independent and launching an abortive signature drive to get on the ballot as an independent. He chose as his running mate Mary L. Singleton, the former director of the Florida Division of Elections and the first black woman to serve on the Jacksonville City Council.

==== Results ====
Shevin: 20–30%; 30–40%; 40–50%; 50–60%; Graham: 30–40%; 40–50%; 50–60%; 60–70%; Tanzler: 20–30%; 30–40%; Williams: 20–30%; 50–60%

Democratic primary results
Party	Candidate	Votes	%
Democratic	Robert Shevin	364,732	35.15
Democratic	Bob Graham	261,972	25.25
Democratic	Hans Tanzler	124,706	12.02
Democratic	James H. Williams	124,427	11.99
Democratic	Bruce A. Smathers	85,298	8.22
Democratic	Claude R. Kirk Jr.	62,534	6.03
Democratic	Leroy Eden	13,864	1.34
Total votes		1,037,533	100.00

Democratic Primary Runoff by county Graham: 50–60%; 60–70%; 70–80%; 80–90%; Shevin: 50–60%; 60–70%

Democratic primary runoff results
Party	Candidate	Votes	%
Democratic	Bob Graham	482,535	53.55
Democratic	Robert Shevin	418,636	46.45
Total votes		901,171	100.00

=== Republican primary ===
==== Candidates ====
- Jack Eckerd, businessman and administrator of the General Services Administration
- Lou Frey, U.S. Representative from Orlando

==== Results ====
Republican Primary by county Eckerd: 50–60%; 60–70%; 70–80%; 80–90%; >90%; Frey: 50–60%; 60–70%

Republican primary results
Party	Candidate	Votes	%
Republican	Jack Eckerd	244,394	63.84
Republican	Lou Frey	138,437	36.16
Total votes		382,831	100.00

== General election ==
=== Candidates ===
- Bob Graham, Democratic
- Jack Eckerd, Republican

=== Results ===
1978 Florida gubernatorial election
Party	Candidate	Votes	%	±%
Democratic	Bob Graham/ Wayne Mixson	1,406,580	55.59%	
Republican	Jack Eckerd/ Paula Hawkins	1,123,888	44.41%	
Majority		282,692	11.18%	
Turnout		2,530,468	100.00%	
Democratic hold		Swing		

== Bibliography ==
- Morris, Allen (1985). The Florida Handbook, 1985-86. Tallahassee, FL: The Peninsular Publishing Company.
