= Florida Citrus Mutual =

Industry trade group representing the Florida citrus industry

Logo of Florida Citrus Mutual

Florida Citrus Mutual (FCM) is the industry trade group representing the citrus industry in the U.S. state of Florida.

The group began operating in 1948 and was formally activated on March 25, 1949. It claims a membership of 3000 growers. It is led by a 21-member board of directors, elected for one-year terms.

== See also ==
- Agriculture in Florida
