= 1986 United States Senate election in Florida =

- November 4, 1986
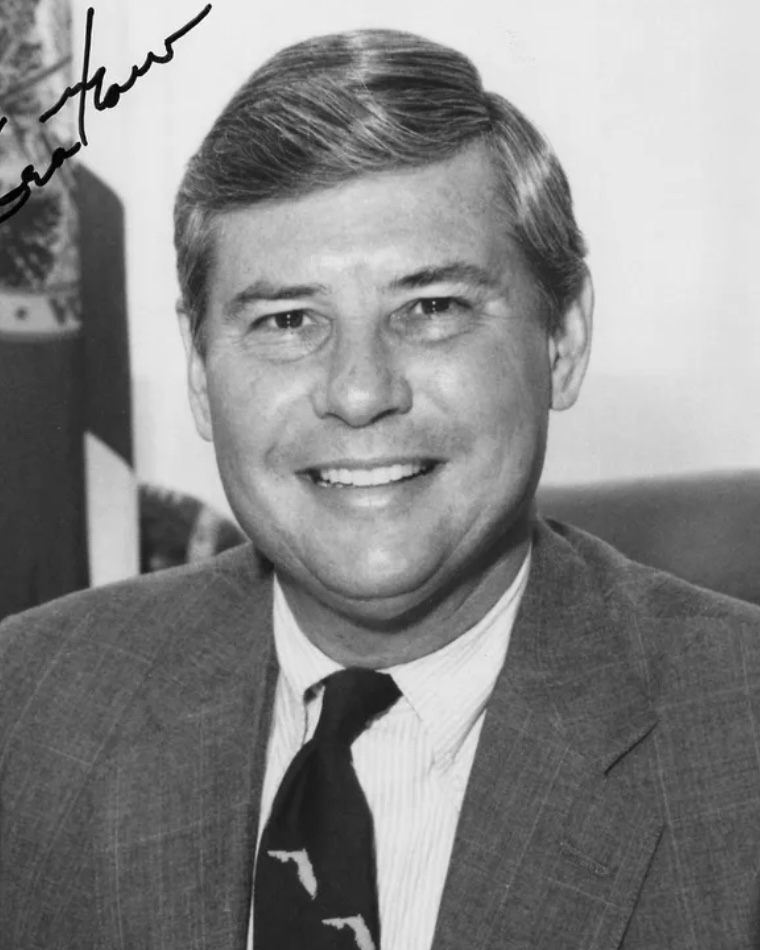

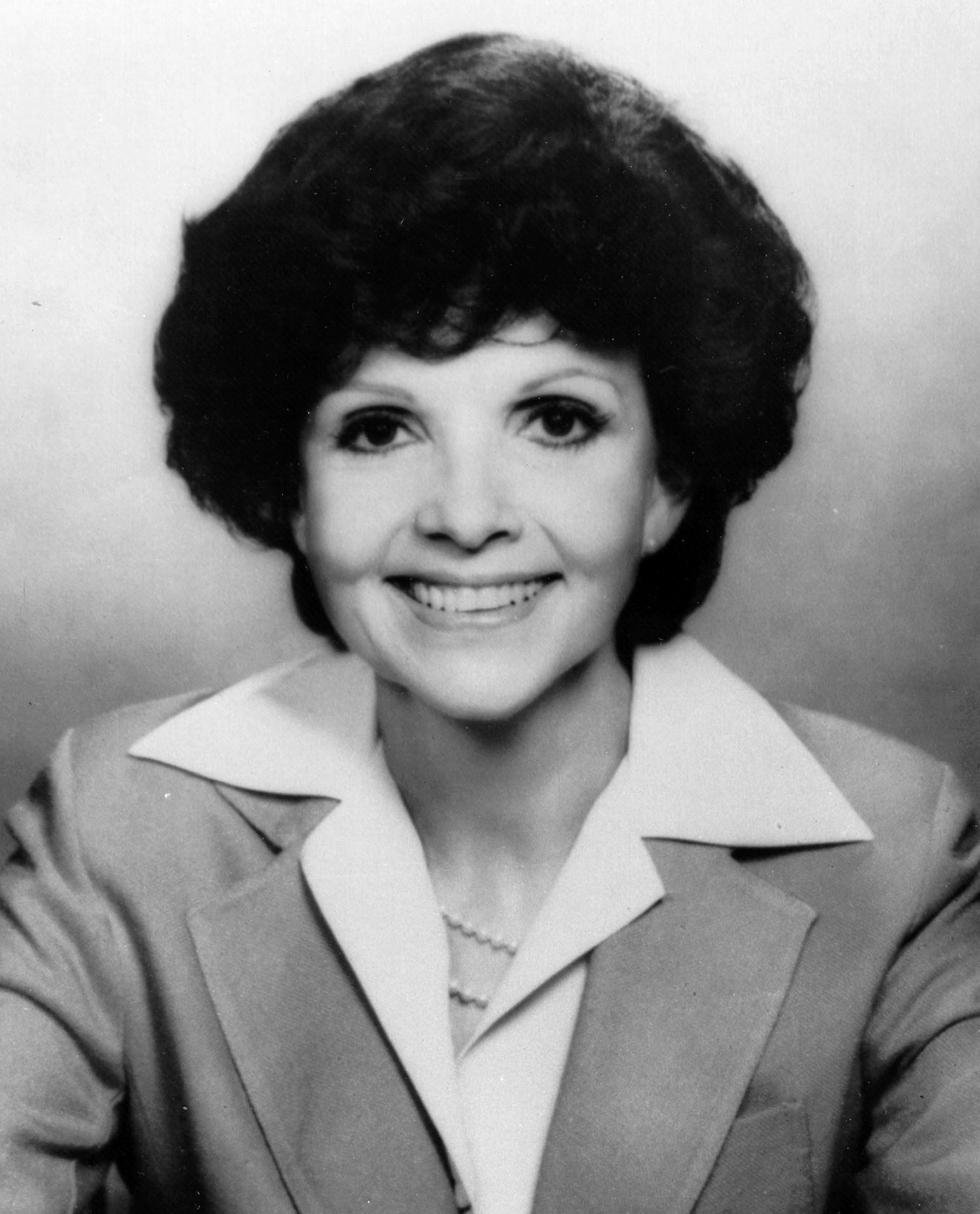
Nominee	Bob Graham	Paula Hawkins
Party	Democratic	Republican
Popular vote	1,877,543	1,552,376
Percentage	54.74%	45.26%
- County results Graham: 50–60% 60–70% Hawkins: 50–60% 60–70%
U.S. senator before election
Paula Hawkins
Republican
Elected U.S. Senator
Bob Graham
Democratic

The 1986 United States Senate election in Florida took place on November 4, 1986, alongside other elections to the United States Senate in other states as well as elections to the United States House of Representatives and various state and local elections. Incumbent Republican U.S. Senator Paula Hawkins decided to run for re-election to second term, but was defeated by Democrat Bob Graham, the popular incumbent Governor of Florida. To date, this was the last time an incumbent from Florida's Class 3 Senate seat lost re-election.

Graham received 83% of the black vote.

== Democratic primary ==
=== Candidates ===
- Bob Graham, 38th Governor of Florida
- Bob Kunst, perennial candidate

=== Results ===
Democratic primary results
Party	Candidate	Votes	%
Democratic	Bob Graham	850,560	85.04%
Democratic	Bob Kunst	149,657	14.96%
Total votes		1,000,217	100.00%

== Republican primary ==
=== Candidates ===
- Paula Hawkins, incumbent U.S. Senator
- Jon Larsen Shudlick

=== Results ===
Republican primary results
Party	Candidate	Votes	%
Republican	Paula Hawkins (incumbent)	491,767	88.73%
Republican	Jon Larsen Shudlick	62,443	11.27%
Total votes		554,210	100.00%

== General election ==
=== Candidates ===
- Bob Graham (D), 38th Governor of Florida
- Paula Hawkins (R), incumbent U.S. Senator

=== Results ===
General election results
Party	Candidate	Votes	%	±%
Democratic	Bob Graham	1,877,543	54.74%	+6.40%
Republican	Paula Hawkins (incumbent)	1,552,376	45.26%	−6.40%
Write-in		77	0.00%	N/A
Total votes		3,429,996	100.00%	N/A
Democratic gain from Republican				

== See also ==
- 1986 United States Senate elections

== Works cited ==
- Black, Earl; Black, Merle (1992). The Vital South: How Presidents Are Elected. Harvard University Press. ISBN 0674941306.
