= Richard Stone (politician) =

American politician and diplomat (1928–2019)

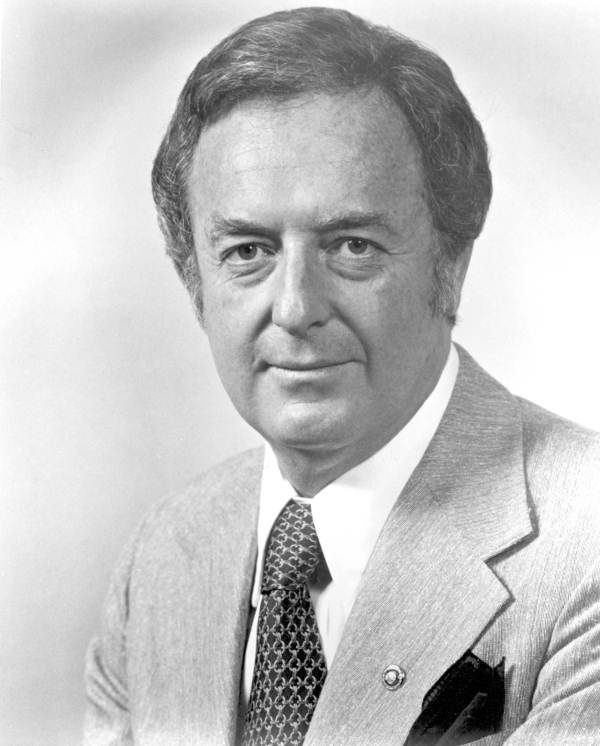

United States Ambassador to Denmark
- In office February 10, 1992 – October 14, 1993
- President: George H. W. Bush; Bill Clinton
- Preceded by: Keith Lapham Brown
- Succeeded by: Edward Elliot Elson

United States Senator from Florida
- In office January 1, 1975 – December 31, 1980
- Preceded by: Edward Gurney
- Succeeded by: Paula Hawkins

16th Secretary of State of Florida
- In office January 5, 1971 – July 8, 1974
- Governor: Reubin Askew
- Preceded by: Thomas Burton Adams Jr.
- Succeeded by: Dorothy Glisson

Member of the Florida Senate from the 48th District
- In office March 28, 1967 – November 3, 1970
- Preceded by: Redistricted
- Succeeded by: Bob Graham

Personal details
- Born: Richard Bernard Stone; September 22, 1928 New York City, U.S.
- Died: July 28, 2019 (aged 90) Rockville, Maryland, U.S.
- Party: Democratic
- Spouse: Marlene Lois Singer (m. 1957; died 2008)
- Education: Harvard University (BA); Columbia University (LLB)

Richard Bernard Stone (September 22, 1928 – July 28, 2019) was an American lawyer and politician who served as a Democratic United States Senator from Florida from 1975 to 1980 and later served as Ambassador at Large to Central America and Ambassador to Denmark. Before running for the U.S. Senate, he served as Florida Secretary of State.

In 1980, Stone lost renomination to Bill Gunter, the Treasurer, Insurance Commissioner and Fire Marshal of Florida.

== Early life and career ==
Stone was born in New York City, the son of Lily (Abbey) and Alfred Stone, who was born in Belgium. His family was Jewish. He moved to Florida and attended public schools in Dade County. Stone graduated cum laude with a B.A. from Harvard University in 1949. There he became a member of Tau Kappa Epsilon fraternity. He received a LL.B. from Columbia Law School in 1954, returned to Florida, was admitted to the Florida Bar in 1955, and began practicing law in Miami.

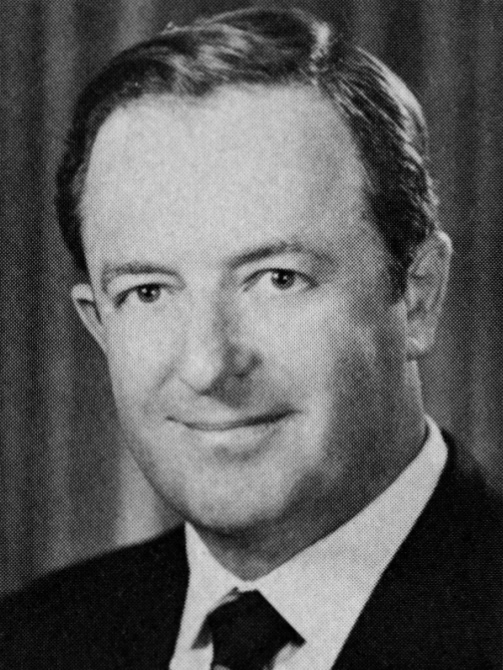
Stone as Florida Secretary of State

In 1966, Stone became Miami City Attorney and was elected to the Florida Senate in 1967, representing Dade County. In 1970, he was elected Secretary of State of Florida. He resigned in July 1974, before his term ended, to focus on his campaign for the U.S. Senate.

== U.S. Senate ==
In 1974, Stone ran in an 11-candidate Democratic primary election. Congressman Bill Gunter finished first but Stone won a close subsequent runoff, 51% to 49%. On the Republican side, incumbent Senator Edward Gurney chose not to run for re-election after being indicted for allegedly taking bribes in return for his influence with the Federal Housing Administration. Millionaire Eckerd drug store chain owner, Jack Eckerd, defeated Paula Hawkins for the Republican nomination. In the general election, Stone narrowly defeated Eckerd in a race that saw the American Party candidate, John Grady, claim nearly 16% of the vote. Stone was the second Jewish U.S. Senator from Florida (after David Levy Yulee) and the first since the Civil War. Outgoing Senator Gurney resigned on December 31, 1974, and Stone was officially appointed senator by Governor Reubin Askew on January 1, 1975, two days before his term was scheduled to begin.

During Stone's term in the U.S. Senate, he was a member of the Foreign Relations Committee and was a strong advocate for the Panama Canal Torrijos–Carter Treaties. He also voted for neutron bomb funding, deregulation of natural gas, and public funding of congressional campaigns, and voted against an early version of the Kemp–Roth Tax Cut and funding medically necessary abortions. He led efforts to secure congressional aid for Israel and also served as an important advisor during the 1978 Camp David Peace Treaty. In addition to the Foreign Relations Committee, Stone served on the Agriculture Committee.

At the onset of his term, Stone was one of three Jewish members of the U.S. Senate along with Jacob Javits and Abraham Ribicoff.

== Reelection bid ==
With a reputation for changing his mind and with the AFL-CIO actively campaigning against him, Stone was deemed vulnerable in his reelection bid. Six Democrats entered the race for Stone's seat including his 1974 runoff opponent Bill Gunter who was Florida State Treasurer/Insurance Commissioner in 1980. As was the case in 1974, Stone and Gunter were forced into a runoff but, unlike 1974, Gunter won the nomination in 1980. Gunter was defeated by Paula Hawkins in the general election. Stone resigned three days early on December 31, 1980.

== Post-senate ==
Senator Stone was included on President-elect Ronald Reagan's transition team the day after the 1980 elections. From 1981 to 1982, he was senior resident partner at the law firm of Proskauer, Rose, Goetz & Mendelsohn in Washington, D.C. During that time, the Spanish-speaking Stone worked as a paid lobbyist for the right-wing Guatemalan government of Fernando Romeo Lucas García. On January 19, 1982, Stone was named as Vice Chairman of the President's Commission for Radio Broadcasting to Cuba. He was also vice chairman of the board of Capital Bank of Washington. In February 1983, Stone served in the Department of State as Special Representative of the President for Public Diplomacy in Central America.

On April 28, 1983, President Reagan announced Stone's appointment as Ambassador at Large and Special Envoy to Central America. Despite concerns over his recent ties with the oppressive right-wing Guatemalan government and how he would be perceived by the leftist FMLN of El Salvador, Stone was confirmed and commenced the position on May 26. Stone was once a paid lobbyist for the conservative Guatemalan government of Fernando Romeo Lucas Garcia. This made Democrats argue that he was ill-suited to be President Reagan's appointee to be Ambassador at Large for Central America, a role that required negotiation with the leftist government of El Salvador and other administrations. He resigned effective March 1, 1984, allegedly after experiencing personality conflicts with Assistant Secretary of State for Inter-American Affairs, Langhorne A. Motley. Stone continued working with Capital Bank of Washington, D.C. and, in 1989, was named chief operating officer. On November 9, 1991, he was nominated by President George H. W. Bush to be U.S. Ambassador to Denmark. The nomination was successful and Stone served from November 21, 1991, to October 14, 1993.

On December 28, 1995, Stone was appointed voting trustee for the discount drug store business, Dart Drug, which was owned by Herbert Haft and embroiled in a widely publicized family dispute. On September 24, 1997, Haft and Stone voted to appoint Stone as acting chief executive officer and, in February 1998, Stone was named chief executive officer. By mid-1998, Dart Group was sold to Richfood.

== Personal life and death ==
Stone married the former Marlene Lois Singer on June 30, 1957 and they had three children and five grandchildren. Marlene Stone died on August 29, 2008. He died on July 28, 2019, in Rockville, Maryland, from complications of pneumonia and other illnesses. At the time of his death, he resided in the Chevy Chase neighborhood of Maryland.

== See also ==
- List of U.S. political appointments that crossed party lines
- List of Jewish members of the United States Congress

Political offices
Preceded by Thomas Burton Adams Jr.	Secretary of State of Florida; 1971–1974	Succeeded by Dorothy Glisson
U.S. Senate
Preceded by Edward Gurney	U.S. senator (Class 3) from Florida; 1975–1980; Served alongside: Lawton Chiles	Succeeded by Paula Hawkins
Diplomatic posts
Preceded by Keith Lapham Brown	United States Ambassador to Denmark; 1992–1993	Succeeded by Edward Elliot Elson
Party political offices
Preceded by Thomas Burton Adams Jr.	Democratic nominee for Secretary of State of Florida; 1970	Succeeded by Bruce Smathers
Preceded by LeRoy Collins	Democratic Party nominee for United States Senator from Florida (Class 3); 1974	Succeeded by Bill Gunter
