= Sarasota Journal =

Daily newspaper in Florida, US, 1952–1982

- Type: Daily newspaper
- Owner: Lindsay Newspapers
- Founded: April 16, 1952
- Ceased publication: July 9, 1982
- Language: English
- Headquarters: Sarasota, Florida
- Sister newspapers: Sarasota Herald-Tribune
- ISSN: 2641-4503

The Sarasota Journal was an American daily newspaper published in Sarasota, Florida, from 1952 until 1982. The Journal was founded on April 16, 1952, by publisher Lindsay Newspapers Inc. as an afternoon companion to their morning daily Sarasota Herald-Tribune newspaper.

Citing steadily declining circulation figures, Lindsay Newspapers shut down the Journal just before a sale of the larger Herald-Tribune to the New York Times Company in late 1982 for an estimated $87 million. The final circulation figure for the Journal was 5,337, about one-third of the paper's reach in the early 1960s.

The paper's last date of publication was July 9, 1982.
