= 1968 United States Senate election in Florida =

- November 5, 1968
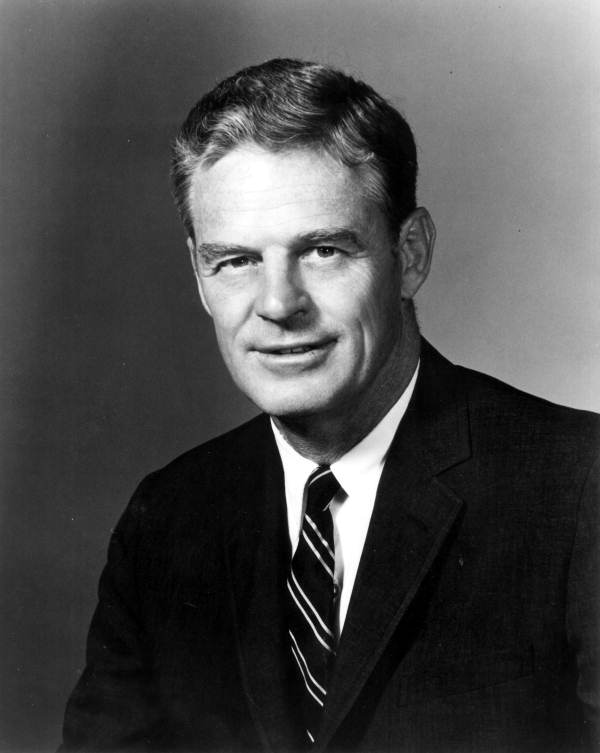

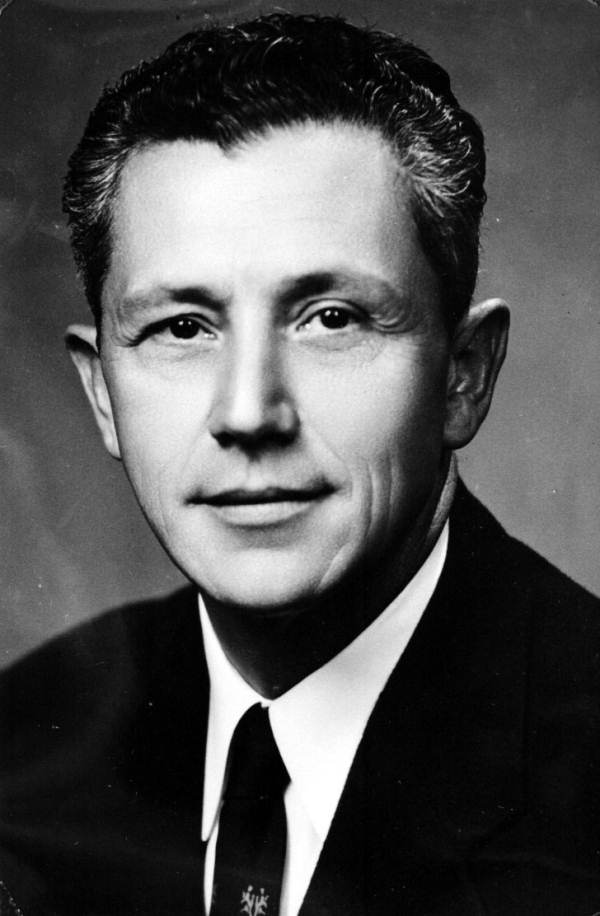
Nominee	Edward Gurney	LeRoy Collins
Party	Republican	Democratic
Popular vote	1,131,499	892,637
Percentage	55.90%	44.10%
- County results Gurney: 50–60% 60–70% 70–80% Collins: 50–60% 60–70%
U.S. senator before election
George Smathers
Democratic
Elected U.S. senator
Edward Gurney
Republican

The 1968 Florida United States Senate election was marked by the election of the first Republican to the United States Senate from Florida since Reconstruction.

Democratic three-term incumbent George Smathers decided to not seek re-election. Popular former two-term Governor LeRoy Collins won the Democratic nomination by defeating State Attorney General Earl Faircloth, while Congressman Edward J. Gurney became the Republican candidate.

Gurney was much less well-known than Collins, but he won by a margin of over 11%. It is possible that Richard Nixon's victory in the presidential race (including winning Florida) helped Gurney defeat Collins. Gurney was the first Republican elected to the Senate from Florida since 1872.

== Primaries ==
=== Democratic ===
20.9% of the voting age population participated in the Democratic primary.

=== Republican ===
5.1% of the voting age population participated in the Republican primary.

== Results ==
Florida United States Senate election, 1968
Party	Candidate	Votes	%
Republican	Edward J. Gurney	1,131,499	55.90%
Democratic	LeRoy Collins	892,637	44.10%
Republican gain from Democratic			

== Works cited ==
- Steed, Robert; Moreland, Laurence; Baker, Tod, eds. (1980). Party Politics in the South. Praeger Publishers. ISBN 0030565863.
