= Edward Elliot Elson =

American ambassador

United States Ambassador to Denmark
- In office 1993–1998
- President: Bill Clinton
- Preceded by: Richard Stone
- Succeeded by: Richard Swett

Personal details
- Born: March 8, 1934 (age 91); Norfolk, Virginia
- Spouse: Suzanne Wolf Goodman (after 1957)
- Education: Phillips Academy
- Alma mater: University of Virginia; Emory University School of Law (JD)

Edward Elliot Elson (born March 8, 1934) is a non-career appointee who was the American ambassador extraordinary and plenipotentiary to Denmark from 1993 until 1998.

== Early life ==
Elson was born in 1934 in Norfolk, Virginia. His father, Harry Elson, was a book seller and periodical distributor, including The Virginia Spectator.

He attended Phillips Academy, the University of Virginia, and law school at Emory University.

== Career ==
When Elson finished his education, he took over the family business, where he is said to have "pioneered retail outlets in airports and hotels" as well as train stations. He was also a faculty and board member of the University of Virginia and chairman of the Board of the following: Bank of Gordon County; Elsonýs; Atlanta News Agency, Inc.; W.H. Smith Holdings (USA); and, The Majestic Wine Corp.

He is a Charter Trustee of Phillips Academy, director of Hampton Investments, Rector of the University of Virginia, founding Chairman of National Public Radio and Chairman of the Jewish Publication Society.

=== Diplomatic career ===
On November 22, 1993, Elson was appointed Ambassador Extraordinary and Plenipotentiary to Denmark. He presented his credentials on January 18, 1994.

When the Soviet Union fell, the long term power dynamics in the region shifted. Eight countries in Scandinavia and the Baltics formed to create the Nordic-Baltic Eight (NB8) to help the Baltic's transition. As Ambassador, Elson "helped to strengthen the bonds of the Nordic-Baltic region and secure American alliances in the region."

Elson left his post on June 25, 1998.

== Personal life ==
In 1957, Edward was married to Suzanne "Susie" Wolf Goodman, a daughter of Charles Francis Goodman of Memphis, Tennessee. She attended the Lausanne School for Girls in Memphis and the Dana Hall School in Wellesley before attending Randolph-Macon Women's College in Lynchburg, Virginia. Susie was a member of the board of regents for the University System of Georgia, former chairwoman of the American Craft Council in New York, and served as chair of Palm Beach's Society of the Four Arts. Together, they are the parents of:

- Charles Myer Elson, who served as a director of the John L. Weinberg Center for Corporate Governance at the University of Delaware; he married Aimee Fauntleroy Kemker in 1993.
- Louis Goodman Elson, who co-founded Palamon Capital Partners in 1999; he married Sarah Everett Lee in 1989.
- Harry Elson, an architect who married Lisa Orange in 1998.

The Elsons owned a two-bedroom pied-à-terre on Park Avenue near 58th Street in New York City.
