= Edward Gurney =

American politician (1914-1996)

Ed Gurney
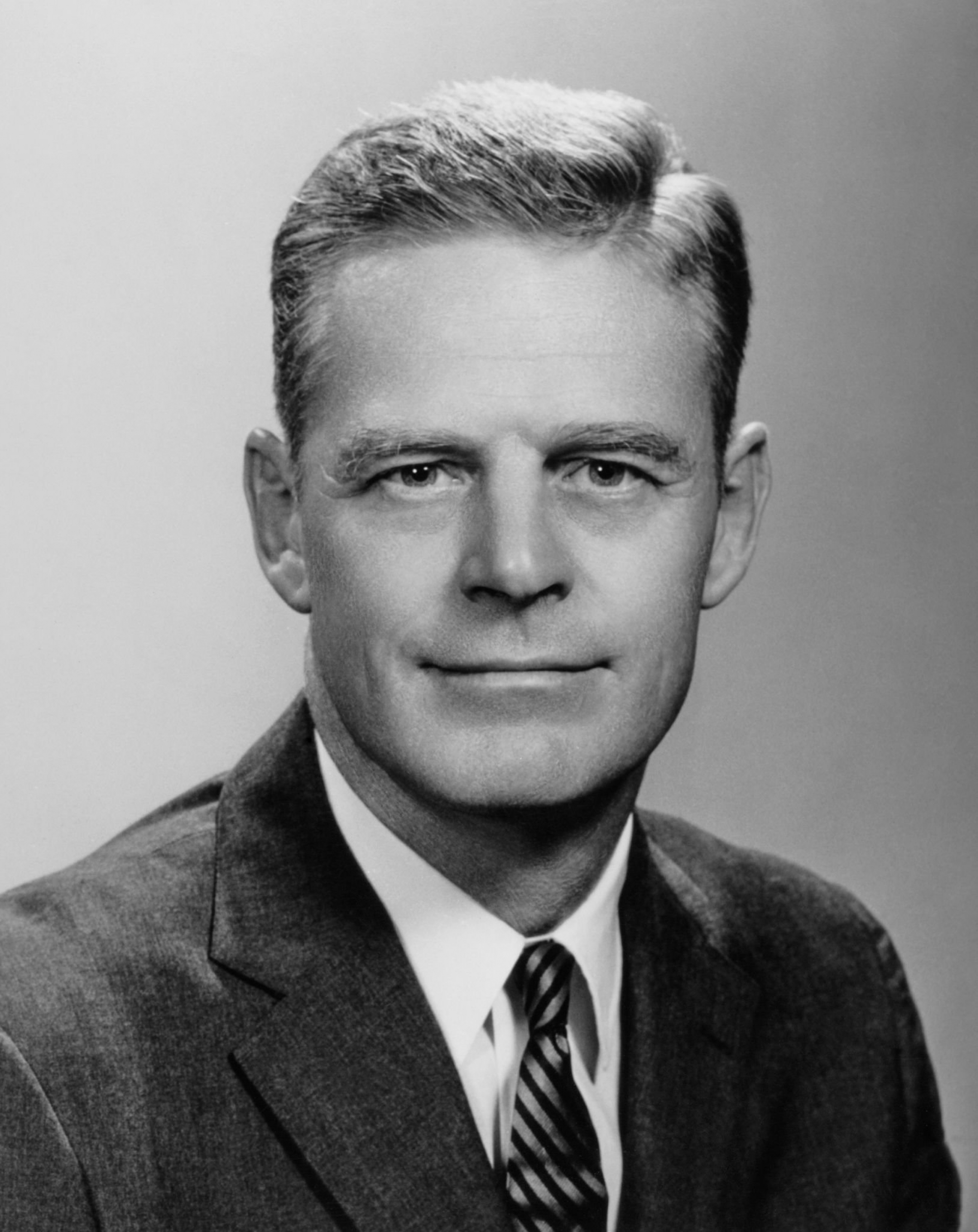

United States Senator from Florida
- In office January 3, 1969 – December 31, 1974
- Preceded by: George Smathers
- Succeeded by: Richard Stone

Member of the U.S. House of Representatives from Florida
- In office January 3, 1963 – January 3, 1969
- Preceded by: District established
- Succeeded by: Lou Frey
- Constituency: 11th district (1963–1967); 5th district (1967–1969)

Mayor of Winter Park
- In office 1961–1962

Personal details
- Born: Edward John Gurney Jr. January 12, 1914 Portland, Maine, U.S.
- Died: May 14, 1996 (aged 82) Winter Park, Florida, U.S.
- Resting place: Palm Cemetery
- Party: Republican
- Spouse(s): Natalie Ahlborn (died 1978); Leeds Dye
- Children: 3
- Education: Colby College (BA); Harvard University (LLB); Duke University (LLM)

Military service
- Allegiance: United States
- Branch/service: United States Army
- Years of service: 1941–1946
- Rank: Lieutenant Colonel
- Battles/wars: World War II

Edward John Gurney Jr. (January 12, 1914 – May 14, 1996) was an American politician, attorney, and U.S. Army officer who represented the state of Florida in the United States Congress, first in the U.S. House of Representatives from 1963 to 1969 and then in the U.S. Senate from 1969 to 1974. A member of the Republican Party, Gurney was the second Republican elected to Congress from Florida in the 20th century.

In 1968, Gurney was elected as the first Republican Senator from Florida since Reconstruction. Following his indictment in an influence peddling scandal, he resigned December 31, 1974. Eventually he was acquitted of all charges. After being defeated in a run for Congress in 1978, Gurney retired from politics and resumed his law practice.

== Early life, education and military service ==
Gurney was born in Portland, Maine, in 1914. He attended public schools and graduated in 1935 from Colby College in Waterville, Maine. He graduated in 1938 from Harvard Law School. He was admitted to the Bar of New York the following year and began practicing law in New York City.

After the United States entered World War II, Gurney enlisted as a private in the United States Army. He was commissioned as an officer and saw action in the European Theatre of conflict. By the time of his discharge in 1946, he had achieved the rank of lieutenant colonel.

After his return to civilian life, Gurney entered Duke Law School, earning a degree in 1948.

== Career ==
Gurney started his work life after Duke by moving to Winter Park in Orange County in central Florida. He set up a law practice, partnering with Lou Frey, who later succeeded him in the U.S. House of Representatives.

In 1952, Gurney was elected city commissioner of Winter Park. He served until his election as city attorney for Maitland. He completed his career in local office with service as mayor of Winter Park from 1961 to 1962.

== House and Senate service ==
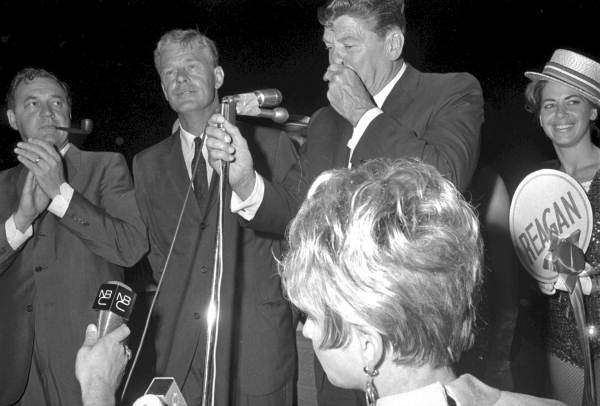
Gurney and Governor Claude R. Kirk Jr. campaign with Ronald Reagan in 1968

In 1962, he was elected to the U.S. House of Representatives, the second Republican elected from Florida in the 20th century. He was re-elected in 1964 and 1966. Gurney has been credited with modernizing Florida politics, using "sophisticated advertising and other media tools for his statewide campaigns."

In 1968, Gurney was elected to the United States Senate for the seat of retiring Democrat George Smathers. The election coincided with Richard Nixon's victory in the presidential race that year, and Gurney was among the candidates who benefited by Nixon's political "coattails". The national Republican campaign conducted a Southern Strategy, trying to appeal to conservative white voters.

Gurney defeated his opponent, former governor Leroy Collins, with 55.9 percent of the vote to Collins' 44.1 percent. Many supporters of third-party presidential candidate George C. Wallace also voted for Gurney. They were part of a coalition of an increasing number of Republicans in Florida allied with a declining number of conservative white Democrats.

Gurney ran on a record that included votes against civil rights legislation (major bills were passed by Congress in 1964 and 1965 to protect constitutional rights of minorities and enforce their ability to vote), foreign aid, and what he labeled "expensive boondoggle," President Lyndon B. Johnson's War on Poverty.

In 1973, Gurney was named to the Senate select committee which investigated the Watergate scandal of the Nixon administration (otherwise known as the Senate Watergate Committee); it was led by Democratic Senator Sam J. Ervin of North Carolina. Gurney was the administration's strongest supporter on the panel, in contrast to the ranking Republican member, Howard Baker of Tennessee.

== Dispute with Bill Cramer ==
Gurney competed in the Republican Party with Bill Cramer, a senior leader in Florida who in 1954 had been the first of his party elected to Congress from the state in the 20th century. They were prospective primary opponents for a vacant Senate seat in 1968 until Cramer yielded to Gurney. He believed that Gurney would support him for the other Senate seat, which Spessard Holland was expected to vacate in 1970.

Cramer's former law partner Herman Goldner had been mayor of St. Petersburg for one term and was a Moderate Republican. He ran in the primary against Gurney in 1968 but, underfunded and distrusted by many conservative Republican voters, Goldner received few votes. Gurney handily won the Senate seat, carrying all but four counties in the race against Democrat LeRoy Collins, a former governor. Gurney and Cramer traveled in the state in various party-building ventures.

In the fall of 1969, Cramer declared his candidacy for the Senate, urged by President Richard M. Nixon to do so. Spessard Holland soon announced his expected retirement. Cramer expected Gurney's support.

But in 1970, Gurney and Governor Claude R. Kirk Jr. opposed Cramer's nomination; they supported an intraparty rival, George Harrold Carswell. He had been nominated that year to the Supreme Court and was rejected by the Senate, with critical comments about his "mediocrity and past "racism." Carswell stepped down from his seat on the United States Court of Appeals for the Fifth Circuit in New Orleans in order to run for the Senate race.

Cramer easily defeated Carswell in the primary for the Republican nomination, but relations within the party became bitter. Gurney did not agree that he and Cramer had a "gentlemen's agreement" about the Senate seat. That fall, Cramer lost to the Democratic senatorial nominee, State Senator Lawton Chiles of Lakeland. The Democrats also took the governorship in Florida, and that year they were generally victorious over Republican candidates in a sweep across the South.

After the election, in his remaining months in office Governor Kirk selected Gurney's Orlando law firm as the counsel for the Florida Turnpike Authority, at a $100,000 annual retainer. Cramer's law firm received no state business.

== Indictments ==
In 1974 Gurney was indicted in an influence peddling scandal. Federal prosecutors indicted Gurney and several political aides for collecting payoffs from Florida builders in return for federal housing contracts. On March 19, 1974, William F. Pelski, director of the F.H.A. insuring office in Coral Gables, FL, pleaded guilty to conspiring to defraud the Government by making loan commitments to contributors to Gurney, Pelski was sentenced to 18 months imprisonment.

Gurney resigned his seat December 31, 1974 and was tried on seven counts of bribery and related offenses. He was acquitted on five counts and the jury could not reach a verdict on two others. In a second trial on those two counts, he was acquitted.

Though acquitted, his standing was damaged by the trials and he did not seek re-election. Jack Eckerd, the drugstore magnate, won the Republican primary, but was defeated in the general election by the Democrat Richard Stone.

== Later years ==
In 1978, Gurney ran again for a seat in the House of Representatives, but was defeated by Democrat Bill Nelson. Gurney retired from politics and resumed the practice of law in Winter Park.

== Personal ==
Gurney married Natalie, whom he met while in law school. They had three children together, a son and two daughters: Edward, Jill, and Sarah. Edward Gurney III committed suicide in 1968. Natalie Gurney suffered a stroke in 1971 and was bedridden for years before her death in 1978. Gurney married again, to Leeds Dye of Winter Park. She and his two daughters survived his death, in Winter Park, in 1996.

== Honors and awards ==
- On November 2, 1968, Gurney was initiated as an Honorary brother of Alpha Phi chapter of Alpha Kappa Psi at the University of Florida.

U.S. House of Representatives
New constituency	Member of the U.S. House of Representatives from Florida's 11th congressional district 1963–1967	Succeeded by Claude Pepper
Preceded by Syd Herlong	Member of the U.S. House of Representatives from Florida's 5th congressional district 1967–1969	Succeeded by Lou Frey
Party political offices
Preceded by Emerson Rupert	Republican nominee for U.S. Senator from Florida (Class 3); 1968	Succeeded by Jack Eckerd
U.S. Senate
Preceded by George Smathers	U.S. Senator (Class 3) from Florida; 1969–1974; Served alongside: Spessard Holland, Lawton Chiles	Succeeded by Richard Stone
