= Lou Frey =

American politician and lawyer (1934–2019)

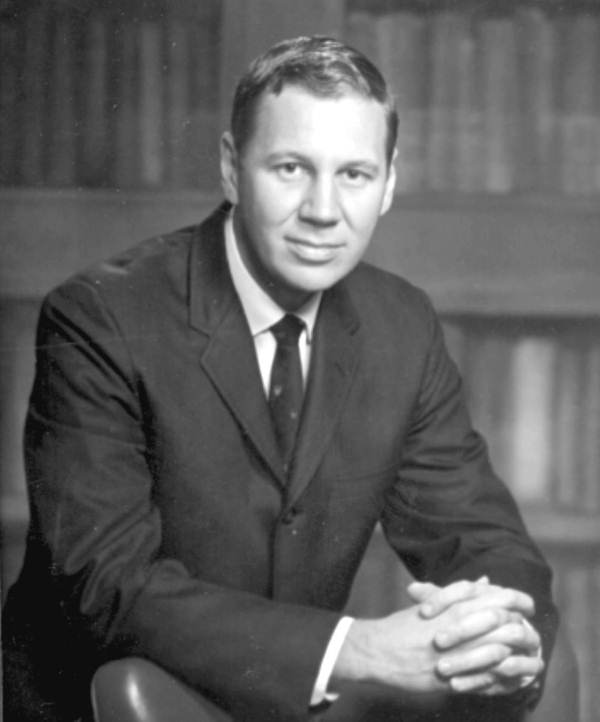

Chair of the House Republican Research Committee
- In office December 14, 1973 – January 3, 1977
- Leader: John Jacob Rhodes
- Preceded by: Barber Conable
- Succeeded by: Bill Frenzel

Member of the U.S. House of Representatives from Florida
- In office January 3, 1969 – January 3, 1979
- Preceded by: Edward Gurney
- Succeeded by: Bill Nelson
- Constituency: 5th district (1969–1973); 9th district (1973–1979)

Personal details
- Born: January 11, 1934 Rutherford, New Jersey, U.S.
- Died: October 14, 2019 (aged 85) Winter Park, Florida, U.S.
- Party: Republican
- Spouse: Marcia Frey
- Education: Colgate University (BA); University of Michigan (JD)

Military service
- Branch/service: United States Navy
- Years of service: 1955–1978
- Unit: United States Navy Reserve

Louis Frey Jr. (January 11, 1934 – October 14, 2019) was an American lawyer and politician who served as a Republican member of the United States House of Representatives from 1969 until 1979. He represented Florida's 5th congressional district from 1969 to 1973 and the 9th district from 1973 to 1979, until he ran unsuccessfully in 1978 for the Republican nomination for governor to succeed the term-limited Democrat Reubin Askew of Pensacola.

== Early life, education, and career ==
Frey was born in Rutherford, New Jersey, the son of Mildred (Engel) and Louis Frey. He graduated in 1951 from Rutherford High School, and received a B.A. in 1955 from Colgate University in Hamilton, New York. He served in the United States Navy in naval aviation from 1955 to 1958, and in the Naval Reserve from 1958 to 1978, where he retired as a captain. In 1961, he earned a J.D. from the University of Michigan Law School in Ann Arbor, Michigan, and he was admitted that same year to the Florida bar.

=== Legal career ===
He worked as a lawyer in private practice, with a brief stint as assistant county solicitor in Orange County, Florida; became an associate, and then partner, in the law firm of Gurney, Skolfield & Frey in Winter Park, Florida, from 1963 to 1967. He then served as acting general counsel of the Florida State Turnpike Authority from 1966 to 1967. Afterwards, he became a partner in 1967 in the law firm of Mateer, Frey, Young & Harbert of Orlando.

== Congress ==
Frey was first elected in 1968 to succeed Edward Gurney, who in turn became Florida's first Republican U.S. Senator since Reconstruction. Frey himself is the fourth Florida Republican to have been elected to the U.S. House in the 20th century. While in Congress, Frey served on the Interstate and Foreign Commerce Committee, the Science and Technology Committee, and the Select Committee on Narcotics Abuse and Control. Frey received the "Watch Dog of the Treasury Award" in each of his terms for "voting to hold the line against inflation and to curb excess government spending." He also received the "Guardian of Small Business Award".

In 1970, Congressman Frey addressed the Florida Republican State convention in Orlando at a time when divisive primaries for governor and the U.S. Senate had seriously undermined GOP chances of victory in the general election. Senate nominee and U.S. Representative William C. Cramer of St. Petersburg had defeated the former judge G. Harrold Carswell of the United States Court of Appeals for the Fifth Circuit. Governor Claude R. Kirk Jr., had topped two intraparty rivals, drugstore magnate Jack Eckerd of Clearwater and state Senator and later Congressman L. A. "Skip" Bafalis of Palm Beach. Then Cramer and Kirk, who were intraparty rivals themselves, faced a united Democratic ticket of Lawton Chiles of Lakeland, running for the Senate, and Reubin Askew, the gubernatorial nominee. Though Carswell and Eckerd endorsed Cramer and Kirk, the primary candidates were inactive in the fall campaign. Apprehensive Republicans cheered Frey, who implored the factions to forget their "family feud" and to unite. But Cramer and Kirk both went down to defeat at the hands of Chiles and Askew, respectively.

Frey served as chairman of the Florida Federation of Young Republicans. He was nominated and elected as a Republican to the Ninety-first Congress and to the four succeeding Congresses (January 3, 1969 to January 3, 1979) from what was then the 5th congressional district. Frey was not a candidate for reelection to the Ninety-sixth Congress in 1978. Instead he launched an unsuccessful bid for the Republican nomination for governor, having lost to Jack Eckerd, whom Kirk had beaten for the nomination in 1970.

=== Statewide campaigns ===
In 1980, Frey was an unsuccessful candidate for the Republican nomination to the United States Senate, being defeated by the eventual winner, Senator Paula Hawkins of Maitland. He ran in 1986 for governor again, but he was defeated in the Republican primary by Bob Martinez, the former Republican mayor of Tampa.

== Later career and death ==
Frey was a past president of The United States Association of Former Members of Congress and served as a member of its executive committee. He regularly provided political commentary on radio and television, co-hosting a show with former Democratic state representative Dick Batchelor on WMFE-FM and appeared on talk shows on WUCF-TV.

Frey resided in Winter Park until his death on October 14, 2019.

== The Lou Frey Institute of Politics and Government ==
Frey was the founder of The Lou Frey Institute of Politics and Government at the University of Central Florida in Orlando. The institute is described as:

a nonpartisan foundation that engages in civic education for college and high school students, members of the Central Florida community, and the general public. The Institute promotes informed discussion of issues from diverse viewpoints, encourages participation in the political process, and supports research on politics and policy.

U.S. House of Representatives
Preceded by Edward Gurney	Member of the U.S. House of Representatives from Florida's 5th congressional district 1969–1973	Succeeded by Bill Gunter
Preceded by Paul Rogers	Member of the U.S. House of Representatives from Florida's 9th congressional district 1973–1979	Succeeded by Bill Nelson
Party political offices
Preceded by Barber Conable	Chair of the House Republican Research Committee; 1973–1977	Succeeded by Bill Frenzel
