= Florida Public Service Commission =

Utilities regulator in Florida

Commission overview
- Formed: 1887
- Jurisdiction: State of Florida
- Headquarters: Tallahassee, Florida
- Commission executives: Gabriella Passidomo Smith, Chairman; Gary F. Clark, Commissioner; Mike La Rosa, Commissioner; Bobby Payne, Commissioner; Ana Ortega, Commissioner
- Website: Official website

The Florida Public Service Commission (FPSC) regulates investor-owned electric, natural gas, and water and wastewater utilities. The FPSC facilitates competitive markets in the telecommunications industry, has authority over intercarrier disputes, and oversees pay telephones, the federal Lifeline Assistance Program and Telecommunications Relay Service.

Five commissioners serve staggered four-year terms on the FPSC. Commissioners are appointed by the Governor of Florida and confirmed by the Florida Senate. The FPSC Chairman is elected by their fellow commissioners to serve a two-year term. Current commissioners include Chairman Gabriella Passidomo Smith, Gary F. Clark, Mike La Rosa, Bobby Payne, and Ana Ortega.

== History ==
Created by the Florida Legislature in 1887, the FPSC was originally called the Florida Railroad Commission and primarily regulated railroad passenger and freight rates and operations. As Florida grew, the Commission's purpose expanded.

The first Florida Railroad Commission was established in 1887 and abolished in 1891. It was reestablished in 1897 and issued its first decision in September 1899, affirming the right of the Atlantic, Valdosta and Western Railway to enter and use Jacksonville Union Terminal

As Florida grew, the commission's purpose expanded. In 1911, it gained jurisdiction over telephone services, followed by motor carrier transportation in 1929. Its name was changed to the Florida Railroad and Public Utilities Commission in 1947, followed by jurisdiction over investor-owned electric utilities in 1951, investor-owned natural gas utilities and safety issues at municipally owned gas utilities in 1952 and privately owned water and wastewater companies in 1959. The name was modified to the Florida Public Utilities Commission in 1963 and the Florida Public Service Commission in 1965. From 1972 to 1978, it regulated airlines, and in 1979, its composition was changed from three elected to five appointed commissioners.

The 1980s saw the beginning of deregulation, with motor carriers (1980) and railroads (1985) deregulated that decade. The telecommunications market was slowly opened up by the Legislature in 1995, and FPSC jurisdiction over telecom was reduced in 2011. However, in 1986, the commission gained safety jurisdiction over all electric utilities, and jurisdiction over intrastate natural gas pipelines was granted in 1992.

== Structure ==
The FPSC consists of five members with experience in fields including economics, accounting, engineering, finance, natural resource conservation, energy, public affairs, and law.

The governor appoints the commissioners, who are then confirmed by the Florida Senate. Commissioners serve four-year terms with term limits. Prior to 1979, three commissioners were elected in a statewide election; the 1978 Legislature changed the FPSC to a five-member appointed board.

The chair is the chief administrative officer of the FPSC, presiding at all hearings and conferences when present, setting FPSC hearings, and performing those duties prescribed by law. The chair is elected by the FPSC.

=== Commissioners ===
- Gabriella Passidomo Smith, initially appointed in 2021 by Ron DeSantis to fill a vacancy and again beginning January 2, 2023, was elected Chair for a two-year term beginning January 2, 2026.
- Gary F. Clark, initially appointed by Rick Scott in 2017 to fill a vacancy, was reelected beginning January 2, 2020, and again for a four-year term beginning January 2, 2023.
- Mike La Rosa, initially appointed by DeSantis beginning January 2, 2021, was reappointed beginning January 2, 2025. He served as Chair from January 2, 2024 through January 1, 2026.
- Bobby Payne, initially appointed by DeSantis for a four-year term beginning January 2, 2026.
- Ana Ortega, initially appointed by DeSantis for a four-year term beginning January 2, 2026.

== Jurisdiction ==
The Florida Legislature established the powers and responsibilities of the FPSC as a regulator of public utilities under its jurisdiction. This includes electric, natural gas, telephone, water, and wastewater. The FPSC exercises the following regulatory authority:

- Rate base/economic regulation - analyzing requested rate changes and conducting earnings surveillance to ensure that regulated utilities are not exceeding their authorized rates of return.
- Competitive market oversight - facilitating the development of competitive markets and issues associated with them.
- Safety, reliability, and service-monitoring - promoting an uninterrupted supply of utility services to the general public, and confirms that such services are provided in a reasonable and timely manner with minimal risks.

In 2022, the FPSC regulated five investor-owned electric companies, eight investor-owned natural gas utilities, and 149 investor-owned water and/or wastewater utilities. The FPSC also had competitive market oversight for 286 telecommunications companies in Florida.

The FPSC does not regulate the rates and service quality of publicly owned municipal or cooperative electric utilities; however, the FPSC does have jurisdiction regarding rate structure, territorial boundaries, bulk power supply operations, and power supply planning over 35 municipally owned electric systems and 18 rural electric cooperatives. The FPSC has jurisdiction regarding territorial boundaries and safety, over 27 municipally owned natural gas utilities and 4 gas districts. In addition, the Commission exercises safety authority over all electric and natural gas systems operating in the state.

== Consumer information ==
The FPSC participates in consumer forums, community meetings, customer meetings and hearings, and consumer publications. The FPSC participates in consumer programs and distributes conservation-related materials through partnerships with governmental entities, and consumer groups.

Each year, the FPSC provides educational brochures to Florida public libraries for consumer distribution. The Commission has recently increased its Library Outreach Campaign participants to educate consumers across the state. Through the program, a variety of FPSC publications highlighting practical energy and water conservation measures are distributed to library patrons throughout the year.

Events to promote energy efficiency and conservation education are annually observed during October's Energy Action Month, sponsored annually by the U.S. Department of Energy.

National Consumer Protection Week observed each year in March, highlights consumer protection and education efforts around the country, and is important to the FPSC's conservation education efforts.

=== Lifeline assistance ===
The Florida Lifeline program is part of the federal Universal Service Program (USP) designed to enable low-income households to obtain and maintain basic local telephone service. The Lifeline program offers qualifying households a minimum $9.25 discount on their monthly phone bills, or a free Lifeline cell phone and monthly minutes from certain wireless providers.

Dozens of local, state, and federal agencies, organizations and businesses, and telecommunications companies were involved in the collaborative effort to increase awareness and participation in the Lifeline program in 2022. Promotional activities in 2022 featured National Consumer Protection Week and ongoing efforts to increase awareness and enrollment in the Lifeline program. Each month, the FPSC sends a cover letter and informational packet to two organizations to encourage continued Lifeline outreach to their eligible clientele. In addition, the FPSC attends as least two community events each month to promote Lifeline.

As of June 2022, 300,285 eligible customers participated in the Florida Lifeline program. The five companies with the highest Lifeline enrollment in Florida were SafeLink Wireless, Assurance Wireless, Access Wireless, T-Mobile, and CenturyLink with 99 percent of the Florida Lifeline customers.

=== Florida Relay Service ===
The FPSC oversees the administration of a statewide telecommunications access system to provide access to Telecommunications Relay Services by persons who are deaf, hard of hearing or speech impaired, or others who communicate with them.

In 2021, the Commission opened a docket to request proposals from companies to provide relay service in Florida beginning in March 2022. Two companies filed proposals, Hamilton Relay and Sprint Communications Company, L.P. (Sprint). After reviewing the technical, financial, and price elements of each proposal, the Commission selected Sprint Communications Company, L.P.'s (Sprint's) proposal on October 12, 2021. Sprint's relay contract to provide telecommunications relay service to the hard-of-hearing, deaf, deaf/blind, and speech impaired Floridians is for a period of three years beginning on March 1, 2022. The contract contains extension options for four additional one-year periods.

== See also ==
- Public Utilities Commission
