= Linda Cox =

American politician (1946–2008)

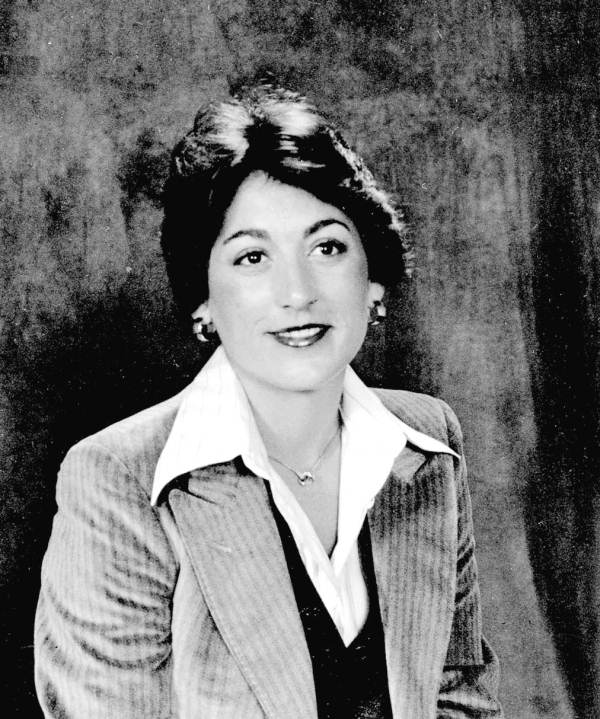
- Cox's portrait in 1976

Member of the Florida House of Representatives from the 86th district
- In office 1976–1982
- Preceded by: Karen Coolman
- Succeeded by: Steve Press

Personal details
- Born: Linda Cedrone Cox; April 18, 1946 Washington, D.C., U.S.
- Died: March 10, 2008 (aged 61)
- Party: Democratic
- Spouse: Sheldon Gusky
- Children: 3
- Education: University of South Carolina

Linda Cedrone Cox (April 18, 1946 – March 10, 2008) was an American politician. She served as a Democratic member for the 86th district of the Florida House of Representatives.

== Life and career ==
Cox was born in Washington, D.C. She attended the University of South Carolina.

In 1976, Cox was elected to represent the 86th district of the Florida House of Representatives, succeeding Karen Coolman. She served until 1982, when she was succeeded by Steve Press.

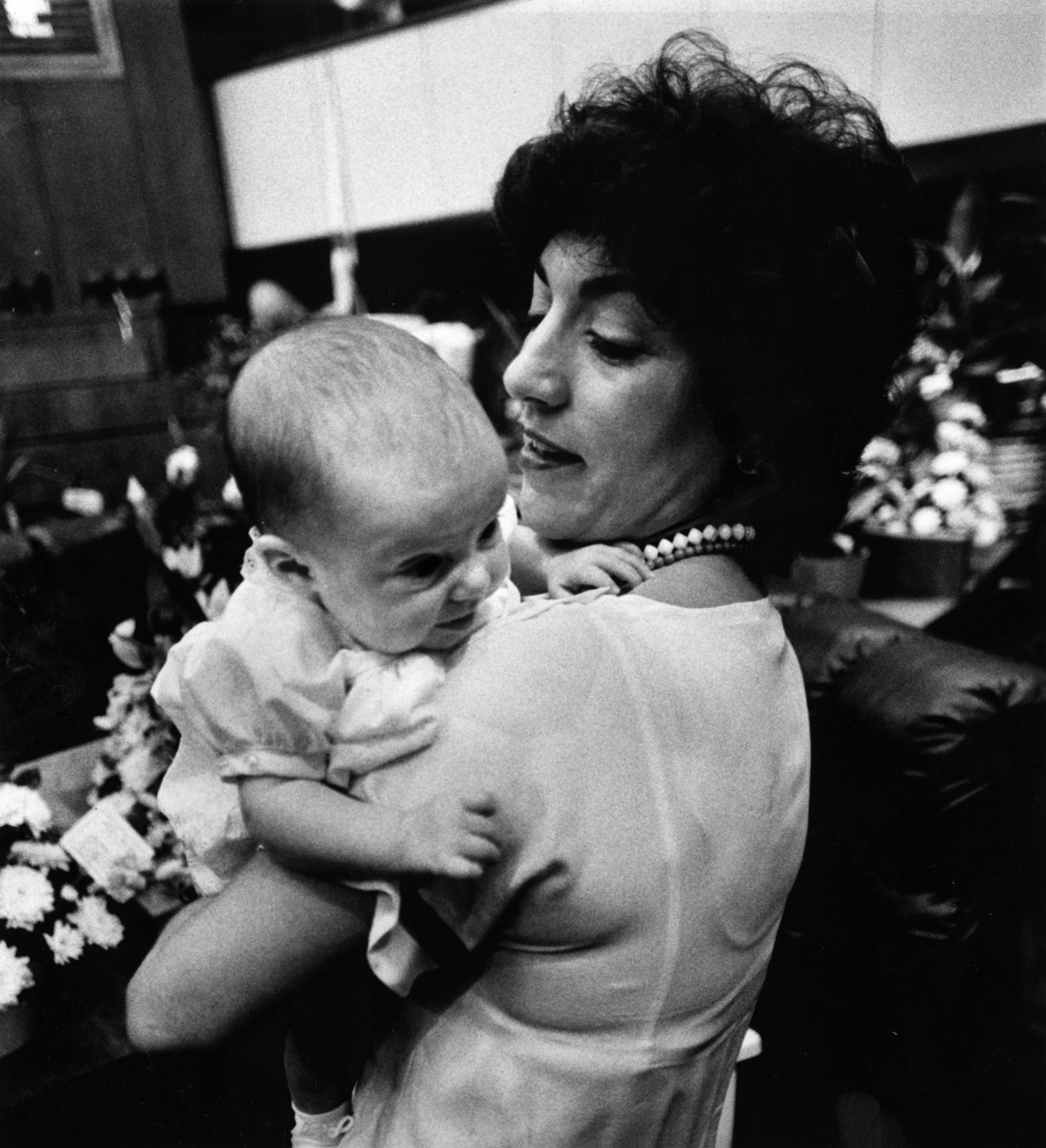
Cox in 1980

Cox died in March 2008, at the age of 61.
