= Rhea Chiles =

American philanthropist (1930–2015)

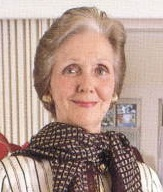

First Lady of Florida
- In role January 8, 1991 – December 12, 1998
- Governor: Lawton Chiles
- Preceded by: Mary Jane Martinez
- Succeeded by: Anne Selph MacKay

Personal details
- Born: Rhea May Grafton; December 1, 1930 Pittsburgh, Pennsylvania, U.S.
- Died: November 8, 2015 (aged 84) Anna Maria Island, Florida, U.S.
- Resting place: Chiles Family Estate; Lakeland, Florida, U.S.
- Spouse: Lawton Chiles (m. 1951; died 1998)
- Children: 4
- Education: University of Florida

Rhea May Chiles (née Grafton; December 1, 1930 – November 8, 2015) was First Lady of Florida from 1991 to 1998 during the tenure of her husband, Governor Lawton Chiles. In 2009, she was designated a Distinguished Floridian by the Florida Economics Club at an event hosted by former Florida Supreme Court Chief Justice Major B. Harding and keynoted by former United States Senator Sam Nunn.

== Founding of "Florida House" ==
Rhea Chiles spearheaded the creation of Florida House on Capitol Hill, the only "State Embassy" in Washington, D.C.

In the late 1960s, Lawton and Rhea Chiles were visiting Washington, D.C., on vacation with their young children. They got lost and found themselves on Embassy Row. One of the children said, "Let's go to Florida's embassy, and they will tell us where we are." They explained that only foreign countries had embassies and that states did not. The idea, however, intrigued Chiles.

In the first year following Lawton Chiles' election to the United States Senate in 1970, Rhea was walking by 200 East Capitol Street. At the time, the neighborhood was unsafe and the properties were unsightly. For these reasons, most people did not come east of the Capitol. Chiles walked past a circa 1891 row house—the historic Manning House—that was in total disrepair. The second floor of the historic property had caved in and the windows were boarded up. Homeless people were living in the basement. Chiles remembered her child's comment about "Florida's Embassy." With that as her vision, she arranged the purchase of the property with $5,000 of her own money and $120,000 raised from friends in Florida. Chiles preferred the sound of Number One Second Street over the original address. With that preference, she boarded up the front entrance and opened the back door as the formal entrance to Florida House. She supervised the historic restoration of the 100-year-old Manning House that came to be Florida House.

In time, she reopened the former front door, which now leads into the garden. In 1983, Rhea Chiles received the Florida Society of Historic Preservation Award for her leadership in the restoration of the historic building that became Florida House.

Unique among the properties of the 50 states, Florida House serves as a "goodwill embassy" for Floridians in Washington, D.C. Florida House sits atop Capitol Hill, and is located nearby the United States Supreme Court, the Library of Congress and the Folger Shakespeare Library. Serving as home base for tourists as well as the business community, Florida House hosts approximately 10,000 visitors a year. It is filled with art and period antiques donated by people from all over Florida, and provides hospitality to all Floridians who visit. The facility also offers cultural and educational opportunities that enable Florida citizens to deepen their appreciation, knowledge and involvement in our federal government. Florida House is run as a not-for-profit foundation, and no state or federal tax dollars are used in its support. It is centrally located on Capitol Hill, and has a clear view of the United States Capitol dome. Chiles served as the president and CEO of Florida House from 1973 until 1988. She later served as Chairman Emeritus of Florida House.

== Other service and contributions ==
A patron of the arts as well as an artist herself, in the 1960s, Rhea Chiles was one of the founders of the Polk County Museum of Art in Lakeland, Florida. During her husband's service in the U.S. Senate, Rhea Chiles presided over the Congressional Wives Prayer Group, and Co-Chaired the Ladies of the Senate Luncheon for First Lady Betty Ford.

Her tenure as First Lady of Florida was marked by numerous contributions to Florida, particularly focusing on the health and welfare of the state's children. The work of the Governor and Mrs. Chiles on behalf of children led to the creation of The Lawton and Rhea Chiles Center for Healthy Mothers and Babies at the University of South Florida College of Public Health, a maternal and child health research and policy institute established by the Florida Legislature in 1996.

Among Chiles' most significant contributions as First Lady was her vision—in tandem with that of her husband, Governor Chiles—that carried out the youth smoking cessation program following the historic tobacco settlement shepherded by the Governor. The Governor and Mrs. Chiles provided the platform and impetus for Students Working Against Tobacco or SWAT, which was funded by Governor Chiles' historic tobacco settlement. This initiative, in turn, led to the creation of a statewide student-led Truth (anti-tobacco campaign). The Truth campaign resulted in a dramatic cessation of tobacco use among middle and high school students, and became a national model.

== Later life and widowhood ==
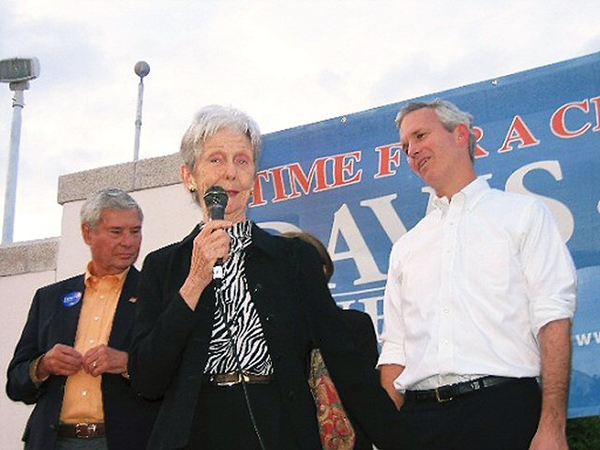
Chiles campaigning for Jim Davis in 2006

In 1998, Rhea Chiles founded The Lawton Chiles Foundation, which carries on the commitment of her husband to benefit the lives of children in Florida.

Over the next decade, Chiles developed and managed The Studio at Gulf and Pine, a community cultural center in Anna Maria, Florida. Chiles died from a lengthy illness at her home in Anna Maria Island, Florida, at the age of 84.

== Artist and author ==
Rhea Chiles was an accomplished artist. Her watercolor, "Window to Washington," which depicts the view of the Capitol from the upstairs window of Florida House on Capitol Hill, is considered the "artistic signature" of Florida House. Governor Chiles established the "Heartland Award for Public Service," which was presented by the Governor to Floridians who were found to exemplify long-term commitment and service to their communities. Recipients of the Heartland Award received a painting, "Heartland," depicting the Myakka River in southwest Florida by Rhea Chiles.

In 1997, Rhea Chiles, then First Lady of Florida, published "700 North Adams Street", a 144-page illustrated history that explores the architecture, interiors, and gardens of the Florida Governor's Mansion; the history of the original 1907 Mansion; and the personal lives and culture of the families who lived in the original Mansion and the one built in 1955.

Honorary titles
Preceded by Mary Jane Martinez	First Lady of Florida; January 8, 1991 – December 12, 1998	Succeeded by Anne Selph Mackay
