= William E. Kilcrease =

American politician

William Edward Kilcrease (died 1860) was a state legislator in Florida. He served in the Florida House of Representatives in 1850 and the Florida Senate in 1852, 1854, and 1855. He owned a cotton plantation in Gadsden County. He owned slaves.

He purchased the Edward Curry Love House in Quincy, Florida. Its previous owners died in a Yellow Fever epidemic. His son Albert Gilchrist became governor of Florida.

Kirk Kirkland wrote a book about his wife becoming a widow after his death in 1860, remarrying, and serving as First Lady of Florida for her bachelor son.
