= Al Cárdenas =

American lawyer (born 1948)

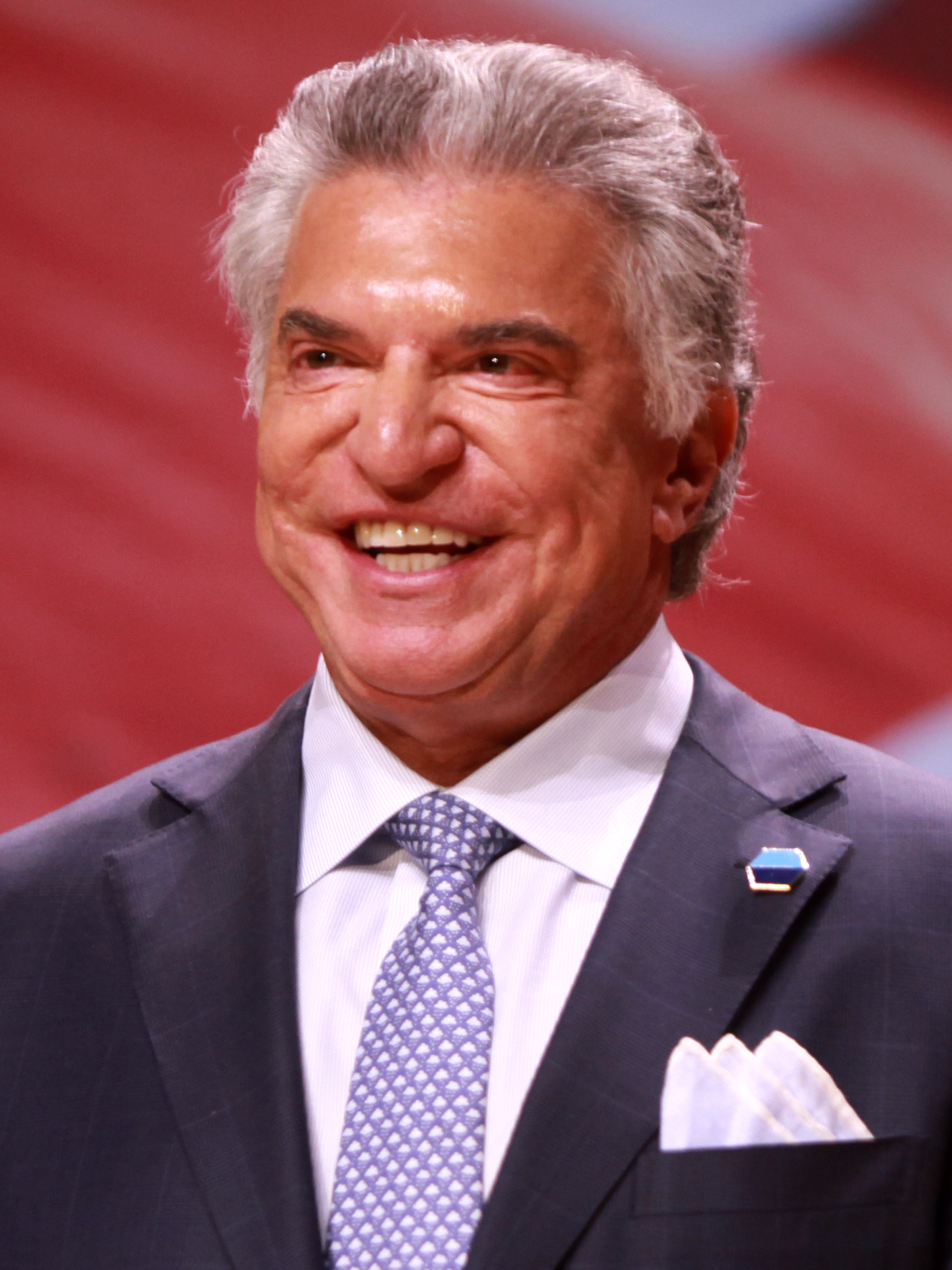

Chairman of the American Conservative Union
- In office 2011–2014
- Preceded by: David Keene
- Succeeded by: Matt Schlapp

Chair of the Florida Republican Party
- In office 1999–2003
- Preceded by: Tom Slade Jr.
- Succeeded by: Carole Jean Jordan

Personal details
- Born: Alberto Remigio Cardenas Pardo; January 3, 1948 (age 78) Havana, Cuba
- Party: Republican
- Spouses: Diana Lora (m. 1979; div. 2018) Ana Navarro (m. 2019)
- Education: Miami Dade College (AA); Florida Atlantic University (BA); Seton Hall University (JD)

Alberto Remigio Cárdenas Pardo (born January 3, 1948) is a Cuban-born American lawyer, politician and conservative activist who is a partner in the law firm of Squire Patton Boggs and in the Advocacy Group at Cardenas Partners. He has been named as one of Washington D.C.'s top lobbyists by The Hill newspaper. Cardenas was a member of the Board of Trustees of Florida A&M University.

== Life and career ==
Cárdenas was born in Havana, Cuba. He graduated from St. Thomas Aquinas High School in Fort Lauderdale, Florida, and received his associate's degree from Miami Dade Community College, a bachelor's degree from Florida Atlantic University, and his Juris Doctor from Seton Hall University. He is an alumnus of Florida Atlantic University's Eta Mu chapter of the Alpha Tau Omega fraternity.

Cardenas has been active in the Republican Party throughout his career. He was responsible for the transition of the United States Department of Commerce at the beginning of the Ronald Reagan administration, and was appointed the first U.S. ambassador to St. Kitts and Nevis in 1983. He served on the board of the Federal National Mortgage Association from 1985 to 1990, as an appointee of Reagan and George H. W. Bush.

Cardenas served three terms as Vice-Chairman and two terms as Chairman of the Republican Party of Florida. He was also appointed to the Executive Committee of the Republican Party, the highest policy-making board at the Republican National Committee. He was the first Hispanic to lead a major state party and remains the only Hispanic Republican Party Chairman in Florida history. He represented Florida as a delegate at every Republican National Convention held from 1976 to 2008.

During CPAC 2011, Cardenas transitioned into the chairmanship of the American Conservative Union, with then-chairman David Keene's retirement. On June 1, 2014, Cardenas resigned as American Conservative Union Chairman. He was succeeded by Matt Schlapp.

Cardenas was a senior adviser and fundraiser for the Jeb Bush 2016 presidential campaign until it was suspended.

In October 2024, Cárdenas announced that he would vote for Kamala Harris.

== Personal life ==
On March 2, 2019, Cardenas married Nicaraguan-American political strategist and commentator Ana Navarro. She is also a contributor on CNN and co-host of The View.

On her podcast, Bleep! with Ana Navarro, in an episode titled, Parkinson's and the Fight Ahead, Cárdenas's wife Ana Navarro revealed he was diagnosed with Parkinson's disease, revealing, "Al was diagnosed with Parkinson’s over two years ago." She revealed they decided to keep it private until Carly Simon was diagnosed with Parkinson's and went public earlier in 2026 and that she inspired them to share the details in order to bring attention to the illness to destigmatize it and advocate for treatment advances.
