= Ann Scott (First Lady of Florida) =

Former First Lady of Florida

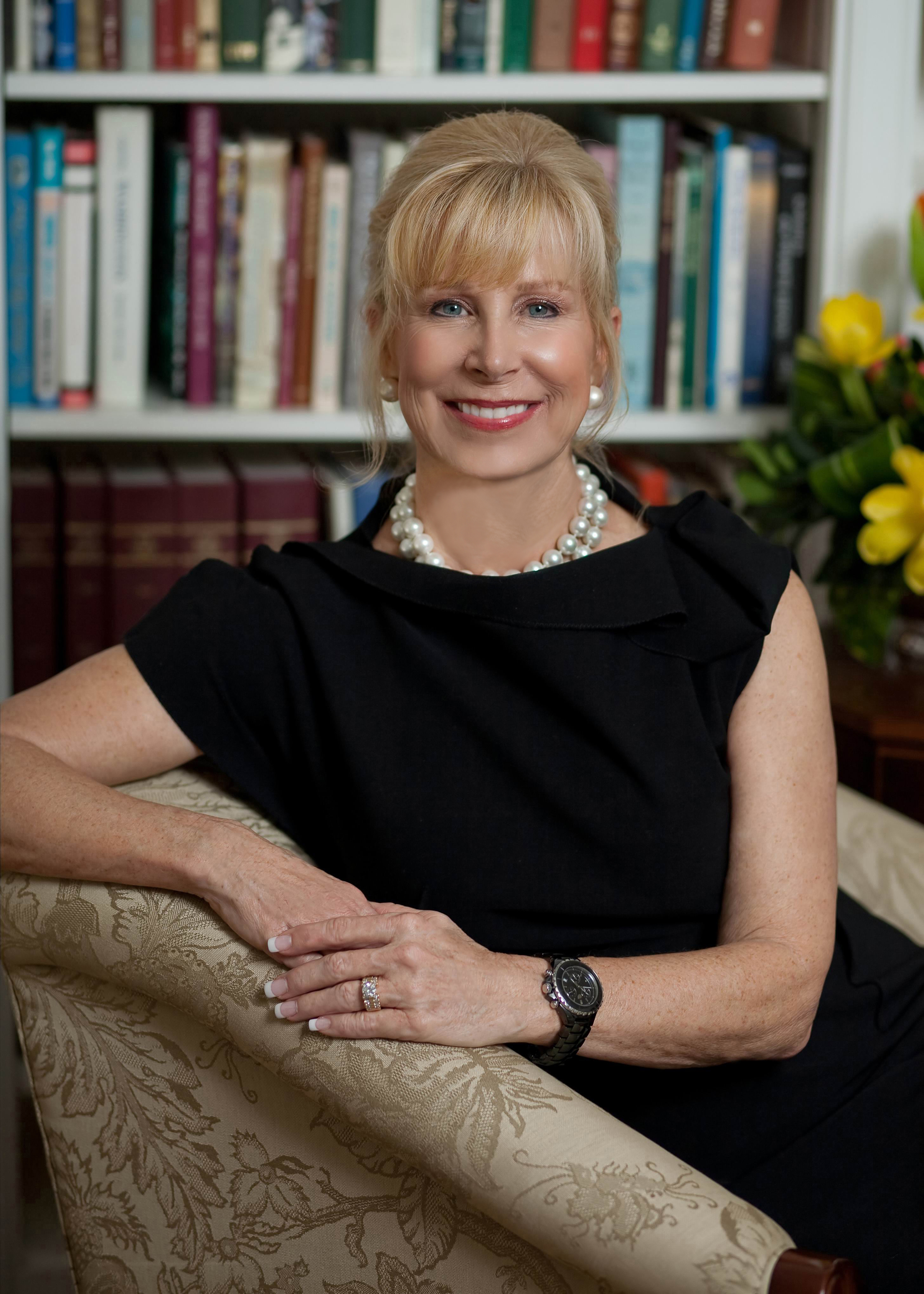
- Official portrait, 2011

First Lady of Florida
- In role January 4, 2011 – January 7, 2019
- Governor: Rick Scott
- Preceded by: Carole Crist
- Succeeded by: Casey DeSantis

Personal details
- Born: Francis Annette Holland; February 11, 1952 (age 74) Mobile, Alabama, U.S.
- Party: Republican
- Spouse: Rick Scott (m. 1972)
- Children: 2
- Education: Southern Methodist University (BA)

Frances Annette Scott (née Holland, born February 11, 1952) is an American businesswoman who served as the first lady of Florida from 2011 to 2019 as the wife of former Governor Rick Scott. She focused her time as first lady promoting childhood literacy.

Scott was raised in Texas and moved to Missouri where she met her future husband in high school. She studied business administration at Southern Methodist University in Texas and worked as a tax accountant for a gas and oil company. She left corporate work when her daughters were born.

== Early life ==
Frances Annette Holland was born on February 11, 1952, in Mobile, Alabama, and grew up in Dallas, Texas. Her father was a regional manager for Sunshine Biscuits, a Nabisco competitor. Her mother stayed at home and raised the children. Scott is the second oldest of four children. Her family moved her senior year to Kansas City, Missouri, where she graduated from North Kansas City High School in 1970.

Ann Scott worked after high school and saved money to go to college. She married in April 1972 Rick Scott who she met senior year in high school. They had a modest wedding at a Baptist church in Kansas City. Rick Scott before the wedding had just finished naval recruitment training, afterwards they moved to his first naval posting in Newport, Rhode Island. She worked as a legal secretary while there. They were 15 months in Rhode Island, before her husband was discharged from the navy and they moved back to Kansas City.

Afterwards, Scott attended community college and worked full time, while her husband attended law school. She received her bachelor's degree in business administration from Southern Methodist University in Dallas, Texas in 1980.

After graduating Scott worked as a tax accountant for Texas Oil and Gas. She left work when she was thirty and had her first daughter, Allison. Two years later she had a second daughter, Jordan. Her husband later became the 45th governor of Florida and served two terms from 2011 to 2019.

== First Lady of Florida (2011–2019) ==
As First Lady of Florida, Scott was an advocate for childhood literacy and welfare. She was actively involved in several initiatives to promote education, healthcare, and the arts. She had a "reading with the first lady" program, which aimed to encourage children to read by providing them with access to books and organizing reading events. She also supported a healthy Florida program, which focused on promoting healthy lifestyle choices and combating childhood obesity.

== Subsequent activities ==
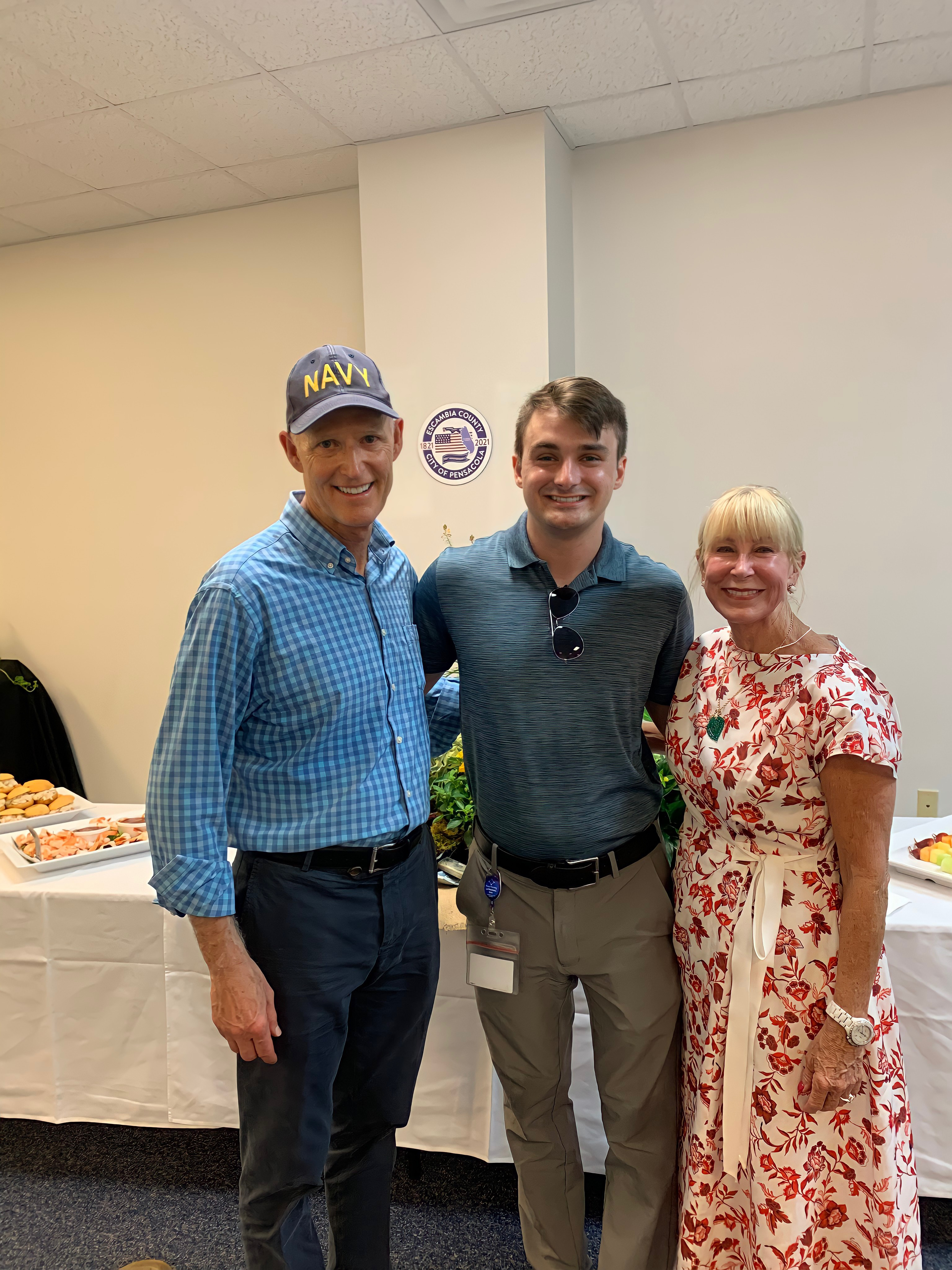
U.S. senator Rick Scott, Connor Mann and Ann Scott at an event celebrating the bicentennial of Pensacola's incorporation

Scott continues to be an advocate for education, healthcare, and the arts, and remains active in philanthropy and community service.
