= Henry Prominski =

American politician (1929–2006)

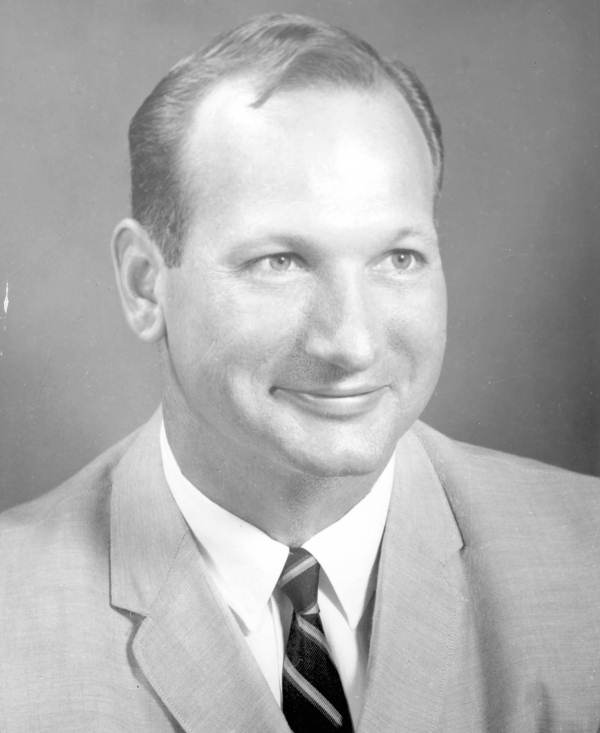
- Prominski in 1966

Member of the Florida House of Representatives from Broward County
- In office 1966–1967

Member of the Florida House of Representatives from the 86th district
- In office 1967–1970
- Preceded by: District established
- Succeeded by: Jon Thomas

Personal details
- Born: September 4, 1929 New Brunswick, New Jersey, U.S.
- Died: April 1, 2006 (aged 76)
- Party: Republican
- Education: University of Pennsylvania; University of Miami School of Law; McGill University

Henry J. Prominski (September 4, 1929 – April 1, 2006) was an American politician. He served as a Republican member for the 86th district of the Florida House of Representatives.

== Life and career ==
Prominski was born in New Brunswick, New Jersey. He attended the University of Pennsylvania, the University of Miami School of Law and McGill University.

In 1966, Prominski was elected to the Florida House of Representatives. The next year, he was elected as the first representative for the newly established 86th district. He served until 1970, when he was succeeded by Jon Thomas.

Prominski died in April 2006, at the age of 76.
