= Tom Slade Jr. =

American politician

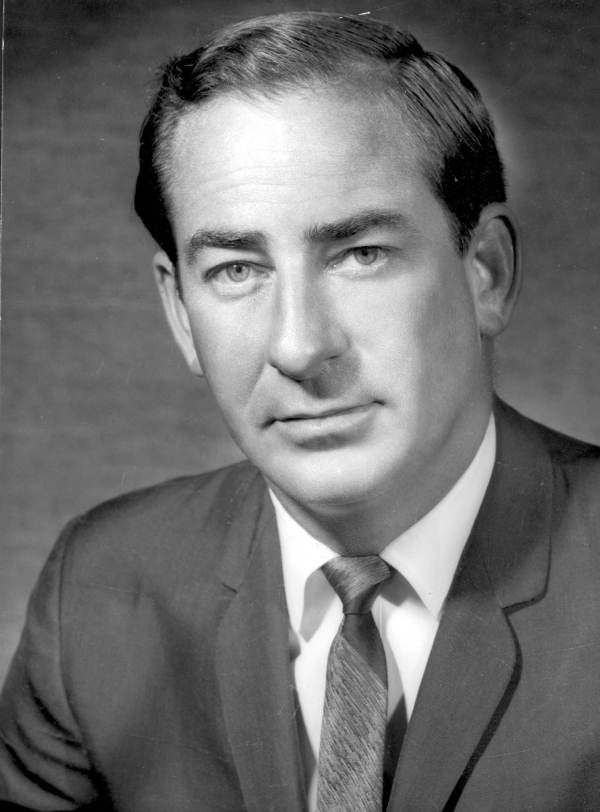
- Slade in 1966

Chair of the Florida Republican Party
- In office 1993–1999
- Preceded by: Van Poole
- Succeeded by: Al Cárdenas

Member of the Florida Senate from the 9th district
- In office 1966–1970
- Preceded by: Nick Connor
- Succeeded by: Lynwood Arnold

Member of the Florida House of Representatives
- In office 1962–1964

Personal details
- Born: March 13, 1936 Albany, Georgia, U.S.
- Died: October 20, 2014 (aged 78) Orange Park, Florida, U.S.
- Party: Republican (since 1984); Democratic (before 1984)

Thomas Howell Slade Jr. (March 13, 1936 – October 20, 2014) was an American politician, legislator, lobbyist, and businessman. He was a member of the Florida House of Representatives representing Duval County between 1962 and 1964, before being elected to the Florida State Senate as the representative for the 9th district between 1966 and 1970. Slade was state party chair of the Republican Party of Florida between 1993 and 1999, being described as "one of the architects of the modern Republican party in Florida."

== Early life ==
Slade was born on March 13, 1936, in Albany, Georgia, and grew up in Clay County, Florida, and went to school in Starke, Florida. He was the chairman of Dozier and Gay Industrial Sealing. Slade was married and divorced three times.

== Political career ==
Slade was first elected to the Florida House of Representatives representing Duval County in the 1962 general election as a Democrat at the age of 25. He later changed parties to become a Republican in 1964 and ran successfully for the Florida State Senate in the 1966 general election. While representing the 9th district in the Senate, he worked to persuade voters to approve the consolidation of the city and county governments in Duval County. He was the minority whip in the Senate for four years. In 1970, he ran as the state insurance commissioner, although he was unsuccessful. During the campaign, he was in a plane crash with C.W. Bill Young.

In 1980s, Slade helped Republican candidates in Northeast Florida, including Bob Martinez's 1985 campaign for governor, and later served as chairman of the Florida Tax and Budget Commission. He was known for his ability to recruit candidates, including future comptroller Bob Milligan and future education commissioner Frank Brogan.

He led the Republican Party of Florida as the state party chair between 1993 and 1999. When he took over the role, Democrats controlled the state House, the cabinet and the governor's office. Following the 1998 election, Republicans led both the legislature and the executive. He has been described as "one of the architects of the modern Republican party in Florida." He developed a computer program that would analyze voter rolls to target individuals in an innovative approach.

== Later life ==
Slade ran to be the national chair of the Republican National Committee in 1999 but was unsuccessful and instead founded Tidewater Consulting, a lobbying and political consultancy company. He was chair of the Duval County Republican Party between 2001 and 2003. He died of heart failure in Orange Park, Florida, on October 20, 2014, at the age of 78. A memoir titled Slade! A Lifetime of Tales and a Political Primer was published in 2016 as the result of a collaboration with Tom and Peggy Fryer.

Florida Senate
Preceded by Nick Connor	Member of the Florida Senate from the 9th district 1966–1970	Succeeded by Lynwood Arnold
Party political offices
Preceded by Joseph S. Yasecko	Republican nominee for Treasurer, Insurance Commissioner, and Fire Marshal of Florida; 1970	Succeeded by Jeffrey L. Latham
Preceded by Van Poole	Chair of the Florida Republican Party; 1993–1999	Succeeded by Al Cárdenas
