= Carole Crist =

American businesswoman

- Crist in 2011

First Lady of Florida
- In role December 12, 2008 – January 4, 2011
- Governor: Charlie Crist
- Preceded by: Columba Bush
- Succeeded by: Ann Scott

Personal details
- Born: Carole Lynn Oumano; October 20, 1969 (age 57) Roslyn, New York, U.S.
- Spouses: Todd Rome (m. 1993; div. 2006); Charlie Crist (m. 2008; div. 2017)
- Children: 2
- Education: Georgetown University (BS)

Carole Lynn Crist (née Oumano, formerly Rome) is an American businesswoman and former First Lady of Florida. Crist is the ex-wife of former U.S. Representative and one-term Florida Governor Charlie Crist, having served as First Lady of Florida from December 12, 2008, to January 4, 2011.

== Personal life ==
Crist was born and raised in Roslyn, New York, a New York City suburb on Long Island. She is the daughter of Margaret and Robert Oumano. Mr. Oumano was the former president of the Franco-American Novelty Company, a family-owned Halloween and costume business. The company was founded in 1910 and was based in Glendale, Queens. Crist graduated magna cum laude from Georgetown University with a degree in accounting.

Crist has two daughters from her first marriage to Todd Rome.

She married then-Florida governor Charlie Crist on December 12, 2008, at the First Methodist Church of St. Petersburg.

After nine years of marriage, in February 2017, Mr. Crist filed for divorce, stating, "I think the world of Carole. She's an amazing person. It just didn't work out for us, I wish all the best for her."

Crist currently resides in Fisher Island, Florida.

== Career ==
After her father's death in 2000, Crist ran Franco-American Novelty for the next six years. She coined the slogan "Where Fashion Meets Halloween" and changed the focus of the company to more figure-flattering, high-fashion costumes. In 2006, she handed over control of Franco-American to her sister, Michele Oumano Powell, and in January, 2013 resigned from her management position. In 2012, Crist started a new Halloween Costume business in St. Petersburg, Florida called Goddessey, L.L.C., which she sold in early 2017.

During her husband's 2016 campaign for Congress, Crist served as acting campaign director, and played a significant role in fundraising.

Crist is currently founder and CEO of CLC Global Advisors, a philanthropic and entrepreneurial venture focused on impact investing.

Honorary titles
| Preceded by Columba Bush | First Lady of Florida; 2008–2011 | Succeeded by Ann Scott |
