= Randy Avon =

American politician

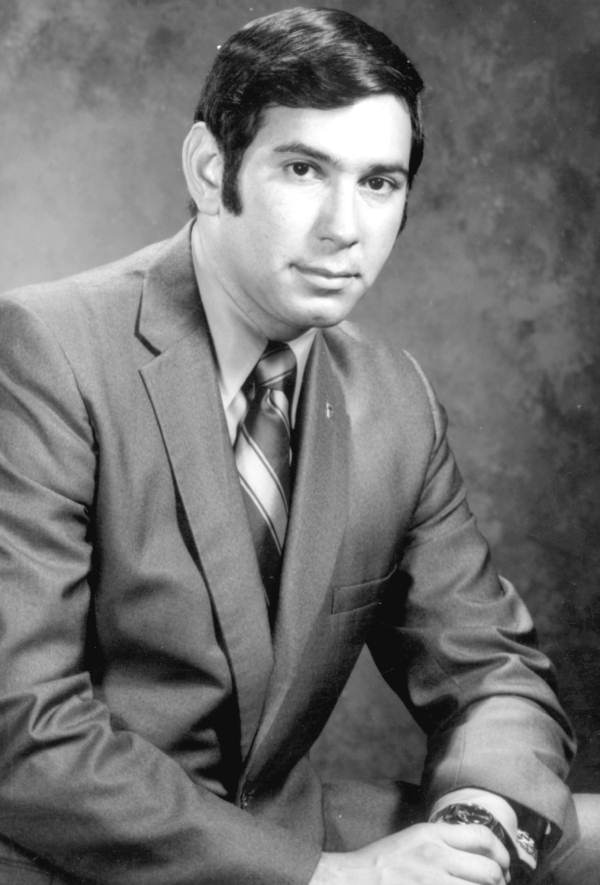

Member of the Florida House of Representatives from the 88th district
- In office 1972–1976
- Preceded by: Van Poole
- Succeeded by: Tom Gustafson

Personal details
- Born: September 25, 1940 (age 85) Honolulu, Hawaii
- Party: Republican
- Occupation: marketing and public relations executive

Randy Avon (born September 25, 1940) is an American former politician in the state of Florida.

Avon was born in Honolulu, Hawaii and came to Florida in 1952. He attended the University of Florida and is a marketing and public relations executive. He served in the Florida House of Representatives from 1973 to 1976, as a Republican, representing the 88th district.

Florida House of Representatives
Preceded by Van Poole	Member of the Florida House of Representatives from the 88th district 1972–1976	Succeeded by Tom Gustafson
