= Joseph M. Martinez Jr. =

American politician (1928–2009)

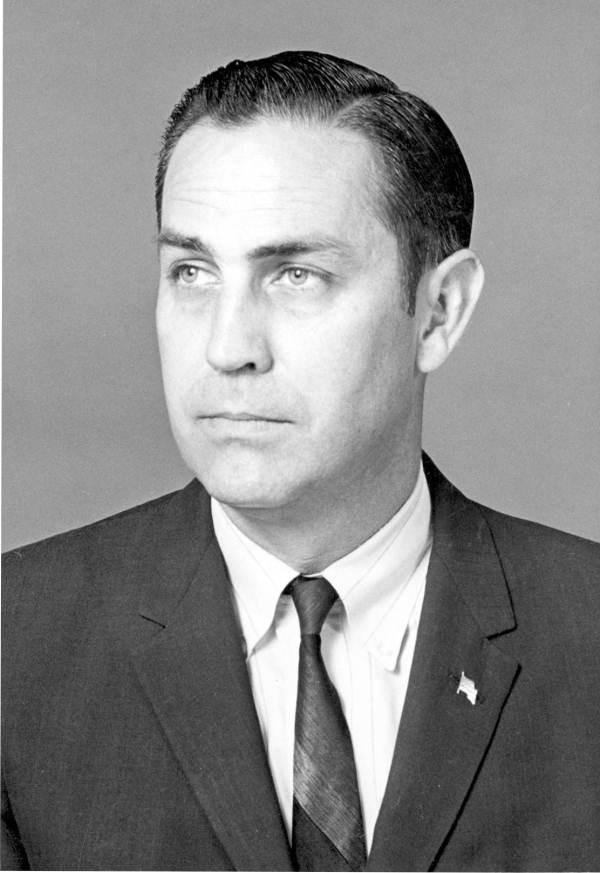
- Martinez in 1967

Member of the Florida House of Representatives from the 88th district
- In office 1967–1970
- Preceded by: District established
- Succeeded by: Van Poole

Personal details
- Born: June 3, 1928 Miami, Florida, U.S.
- Died: December 2, 2009 (aged 81)
- Party: Republican
- Education: Florida State University; University of Miami

Joseph M. Martinez Jr. (June 3, 1928 – December 2, 2009) was an American politician who served as a Republican member for the 88th district of the Florida House of Representatives.

== Biography ==
Martinez was born in Miami, Florida. He attended Florida State University and the University of Miami.

In 1967, Martinez was elected as the first representative for the newly established 88th district of the Florida House of Representatives. He served until 1970, when he was succeeded by Van Poole.

Martinez died on December 2, 2009, at the age of 81.
