= Nick Connor =

American politician (1904–1995)

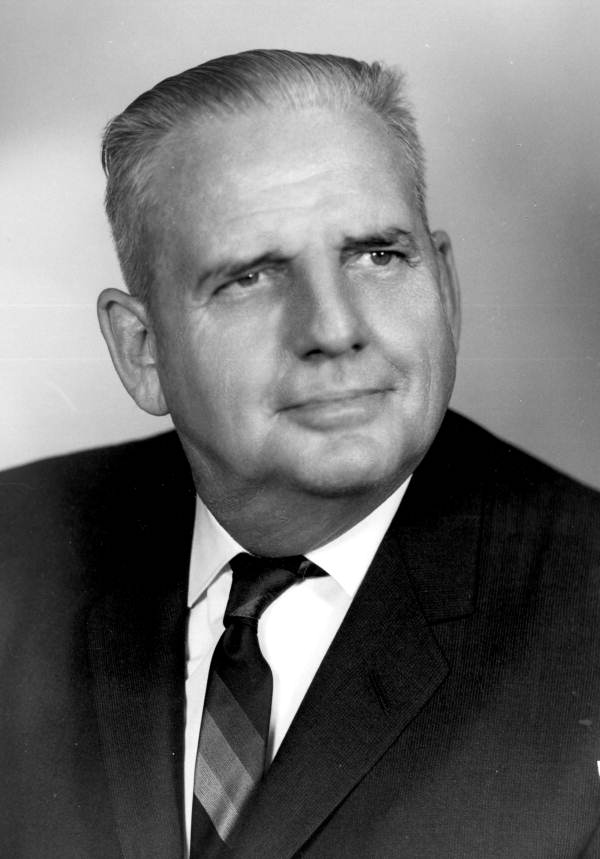

Member of the Florida Senate from the 9th district
- In office 1953–1965
- Preceded by: Joseph E. Johnston Jr.
- Succeeded by: Tom Slade

Personal details
- Born: James Elliott Connor; July 7, 1904 Gadsden, Alabama, U.S.
- Died: December 7, 1995 (aged 91) Hernando County, Florida, U.S.
- Party: Democratic
- Spouse: Rachael Allen Barnes
- Children: one daughter
- Education: University of Florida
- Occupation: business fuel oil distributor, rancher

James Elliott Connor (July 7, 1904 – December 7, 1995) was an American politician in the state of Florida.

Connor was born in Gadsden, Alabama, to Claude Eugene and Ruby Clayton (Dunklin) Connor. The family moved to Florida in 1907. Connor attended public schools in Marion County, graduated from Citrus County High School in 1922, and attended the University of Florida, where he majored in political science. He was a business fuel oil distributor and rancher. Connor served in the Florida State Senate from 1955 to 1965 as a Democratic member for the 9th district. He was a member of the Pork Chop Gang, a group of legislators from rural areas that dominated the state legislature due to malapportionment and used their power to engage in McCarthyist tactics.
