= Jon Thomas (politician) =

American politician (1939–2013)

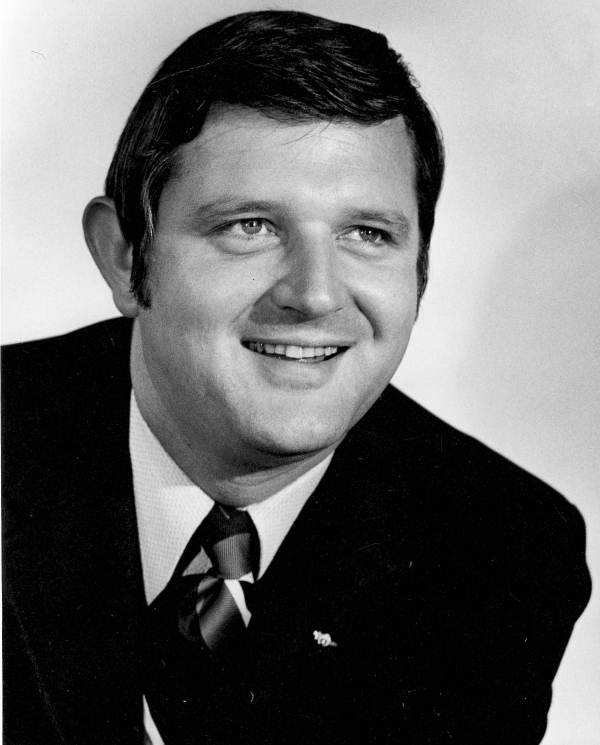
- Thomas in 1975

Member of the Florida House of Representatives from the 86th district
- In office 1970–1974
- Preceded by: Henry Prominski
- Succeeded by: Karen Coolman

Member of the Florida Senate from the 30th District
- In office 1974–1978
- Preceded by: Charles Weber
- Succeeded by: Van Poole

Personal details
- Born: January 22, 1939 Uniontown, Pennsylvania, U.S.
- Died: June 12, 2013 (aged 74)
- Party: Republican; Democratic
- Spouse: Patsy Ann Fowler

Jon C. Thomas (January 22, 1939 – June 12, 2013) was an American politician. He served as a member for the 86th district of the Florida House of Representatives. He also served as a member for the 30th district of the Florida Senate.

== Life and career ==
Thomas was born in Uniontown, Pennsylvania. He served in the United States Army.

In 1970, Thomas was elected to represent the 86th district of the Florida House of Representatives, succeeding Henry Prominski. He served until 1974, when he was succeeded by Karen Coolman. In the same year, he was elected to represent the 30th district of the Florida Senate, serving until 1978.

Thomas died in June 2013, at the age of 74.
