= Lawton Chiles =

American politician (1930–1998)

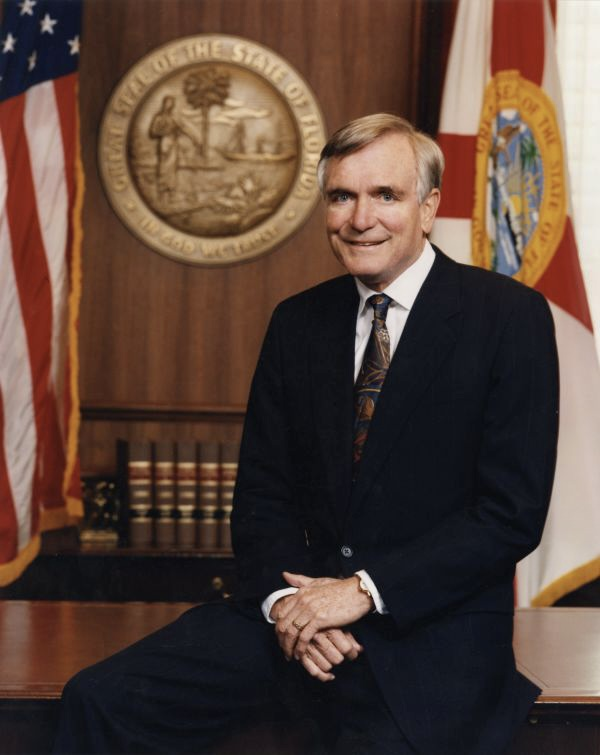

41st Governor of Florida
- In office January 8, 1991 – December 12, 1998
- Lieutenant: Buddy MacKay
- Preceded by: Bob Martinez
- Succeeded by: Buddy MacKay

United States Senator from Florida
- In office January 3, 1971 – January 3, 1989
- Preceded by: Spessard Holland
- Succeeded by: Connie Mack III
Senate positions
Chair of the Senate Budget Committee
In office January 3, 1987 – January 3, 1989
Preceded by	Pete Domenici
Succeeded by	Jim Sasser
Ranking Member of the Senate Budget Committee
In office January 3, 1983 – January 3, 1987
Preceded by	Fritz Hollings
Succeeded by	Pete Domenici
Ranking Member of the Senate Aging Committee
In office January 3, 1981 – January 3, 1983
Preceded by	Pete Domenici
Succeeded by	John Glenn
Chair of the Senate Aging Committee
In office January 3, 1979 – January 3, 1981
Preceded by	Frank Church
Succeeded by	John Heinz

Member of the Florida Senate
- In office November 8, 1966 – November 3, 1970
- Preceded by: Redistricted
- Succeeded by: Bob Brannen
- Constituency: 26th district (1966–1967); 28th district (1967–1970)

Member of the Florida House of Representatives from Polk County, Group 1
- In office November 4, 1958 – November 8, 1966
- Preceded by: Roy Surles
- Succeeded by: John R. Clark

Personal details
- Born: Lawton Mainor Chiles Jr. April 3, 1930 Lakeland, Florida, U.S.
- Died: December 12, 1998 (aged 68) Tallahassee, Florida, U.S.
- Party: Democratic
- Spouse: Rhea May Grafton (m. 1951)
- Children: 4
- Relatives: Kay Hagan (niece)
- Education: University of Florida (BA, JD)
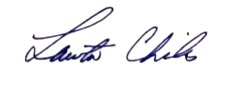
- Signature

Military service
- Allegiance: United States
- Branch/service: United States Army
- Years of service: 1952–1954
- Rank: First lieutenant
- Battles/wars: Korean War

Lawton Mainor Chiles Jr. (April 3, 1930 – December 12, 1998) was an American politician and military officer. A member of the Democratic Party, he served as a United States senator from Florida from 1971 to 1989 and as the 41st governor of Florida from 1991 until his death in December 1998.

A Korean War veteran, Chiles later returned to Florida for law school and eventually opened his own private practice in 1955. Three years later, Chiles entered politics with a successful bid for the Florida House of Representatives in 1958.

By 1966, Chiles left the Florida House to run for the Florida Senate. Despite 12 years in the Florida Legislature, Chiles was relatively unknown when he decided to bid for United States Senate in 1970. He embarked on a 1,003-mile walk from Pensacola to Key West for his campaign, earning him the nickname "Walkin' Lawton". It was successful and Chiles defeated his opponent William C. Cramer by a 53.9%–46.1% margin. Chiles was re-elected with relative ease in 1976 and 1982. He retired from the United States Senate in 1989.

Not long after his retirement, supporters convinced him to run for governor of Florida in 1990 against the unpopular incumbent Republican Bob Martinez, and Chiles defeated Martinez with 56.5% of the vote. During his first term as Governor, Chiles reformed health care and oversaw recovery efforts from Hurricane Andrew in 1992. Chiles faced a tough re-election bid in 1994 against Jeb Bush, a businessman and son of former president George H. W. Bush. Chiles prevailed over Bush with 50.75% of the vote, with a margin of fewer than 64,000 votes. During his second term, Chiles worked on education reform. On December 12, 1998, he suffered a heart arrhythmia and died at the Florida Governor's Mansion, leaving Lieutenant Governor Buddy MacKay to serve the remaining 24 days of Chiles' unexpired term. Jeb Bush succeeded MacKay. As of 2026, Chiles is the last Democrat to be elected as Governor of Florida.

== Early life and education ==
Chiles was born in Polk County, Florida near Lakeland, the son of Margaret Kate (née Patterson) and Lawton Mainor Chiles. He attended public school at Lakeland High School, then the University of Florida at Gainesville. At the University of Florida, he was active in student politics. Chiles was a member of Phi Delta Phi International Legal Honor Society Cockrell Inn and was inducted into both the university Hall of Fame (the most prestigious honor a student can receive at UF) and Florida Blue Key.

He was a member of the Alpha Tau Omega fraternity. He graduated in 1952. Following his college years, Chiles entered the Korean War, commissioned as an artillery officer in the United States Army. After the war, Chiles returned to the University of Florida for law school, from which he graduated in 1955; he passed the state bar exam that year and went into private practice in Lakeland. He married Rhea Grafton.

== Early career ==
In 1958, Chiles, a Democrat, was elected to the Florida House of Representatives. It was essentially still a one-party state, as most African Americans were disfranchised by a constitution and laws passed since the turn of the century. Chiles served in the House until 1966, when he was elected to a seat in the Florida Senate, which he held until 1970. While in the state senate, Chiles served on the 1968 Florida Law Revision Commission. During his time in the state legislature, Chiles continued to work as a lawyer and developer in Lakeland. He was one of the initial investors in the Red Lobster restaurant chain. He was a member of the Florida Society of the Sons of the American Revolution.

== The 1,003-mile walk ==
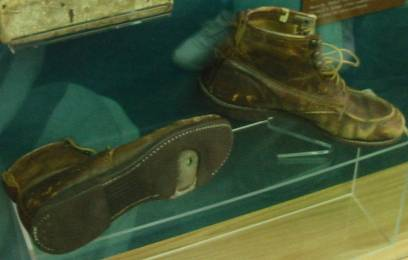
Pair of Lawton Chiles' walking shoes on display at the Florida State Capitol.

In 1970, Chiles decided to run for a seat in the United States Senate. At the time, despite his 12 years in the state legislature, he was largely unknown outside his Lakeland-based district. To generate some media coverage and meet people across the state, Chiles embarked upon a 1,003-mile, 91-day walk across Florida from Pensacola to Key West. The walk earned him the recognition he sought, as well as the nickname that would follow him throughout his political career– "Walkin' Lawton". In his journal Chiles wrote that sometimes he walked alone, while other times he met ordinary Floridians along the way. In later years, Chiles would recall the walk allowed him to see Florida's natural beauty, as well as the state's problems, with fresh eyes. Some Florida reporters said that Chiles enjoyed campaigning much more than governing.

== Chiles v. Cramer ==
In the general election campaign, Chiles faced U.S. representative William C. Cramer of St. Petersburg, the first Republican to have served in Congress from Florida since Reconstruction. Cramer, a graduate of Harvard Law School, questioned Chiles's votes as a state senator on several matters regarding insurance. One law increased automobile liability rates by 50 percent over two years, and another raised premiums for school bus insurance, at a time that Chiles's insurance agency in Lakeland held the policy on the Polk County School Board, but such "conflict-of-interest" accusations seemed to have little political effect.

The self-made Cramer depicted Chiles as coming from a "silver spoon" background with a then net worth of $300,000, but the media ignored questions about the candidates' personal wealth. Instead, reporters focused on the walk, often termed a "public relations stroke of genius." Prior to the walk, Chiles was identified by only 5 percent of voters; afterwards, he had widespread positive recognition.

The Tallahassee Democrat forecast correctly that Chiles's "weary feet and comfortable hiking boots" would carry the 40-year-old "slow-country country lawyer" with "boyish amiability", and "back-country common sense and methodical urbane political savvy" to victory. Chiles's "Huck Finn" image was contrasted one night in Miami when he held a fried chicken picnic while the Republicans showcased a black-tie $1,000-a-plate dinner.

Cramer could not match Chiles's public appeal. An observer described Cramer's "charisma" as "a speech in the Congressional Record." A Cramer aide said it was difficult "selling experience. It's not a sexy thing." A Chiles advertisement urged that voters "Vote for yourself. Chiles walked our streets and highways to hear what you have to say. That's why a vote for Chiles is like a vote for yourself." With "shoe leather and a shoestring budget", Chiles presented himself as a "problem solver who doesn't automatically vote 'No' on every issue."

Cramer said that he should have demanded more debates and rebuffed the walking tactic: "I never could get that turned around. He was walking, and I was running. But the press was enamored with the walk ... Every time he was asked a question about where he stood, he would quote somebody that he met on the campaign trail to state what he was to do when he got to the Senate consistent with what that constituent had said. The basic approach gave him more credibility to his walk, which had nothing to do with his qualifications for the Senate but gave him free publicity and appealed to the 'little man.'"

With ecology a national concern by 1970, Chiles announced his opposition to the Cross Florida Barge Canal, which had originally been supported by every member of the Florida congressional delegation. The project, one-third completed, was cancelled early in 1971 and is now a protected green belt corridor. Chiles endorsed federal funding to remove waste from the bass-teeming Lake Apopka in central Florida. By contrast, Cramer received little credit from environmentalists although he had drafted the Water Pollution Control Act of 1956 and had sponsored legislation to protect alligators, stop beach erosion, dredge harbors, and remove oil spills. Instead, Cramer's critics accused him of having weakened anti-pollution laws. Cramer questioned Chiles's opposition to a proposed severance tax on phosphate mining, which particularly impacted Tampa Bay. Cramer declared that "Liberal Lawton has protected the phosphate industry -- the state's single largest polluter."

By 1974, a survey showed Floridians favored limits on development, and 60 percent urged more government funding for conservation.

Only three newspapers—in Orlando, Fort Myers, and Pasco County—supported Cramer in the race against Chiles. In the face of media opposition, Cramer failed to pin the "liberal" label on Chiles, who called himself by the rare hybrid term "progressive conservative." Explaining Cramer's inability to make "liberalism" an issue in 1970, The New York Times observed that Chiles and the gubernatorial candidate, Reubin Askew of Pensacola, "convey amiable good ol' boy qualities with moderate-to-liberal aspirations that do not strike fear into the hearts of conservatives."

Chiles relied heavily on his support from the retiring senator and former governor Spessard Holland. He noted that Cramer had expected to face former governor Farris Bryant, who like LeRoy Collins, Gurney's foe in 1968, had ties to the administration of President Lyndon B. Johnson. Bryant lost the senatorial primary to Chiles. "I'm not anything Cramer thought he would be running against. So he's reduced to telling lies about me," Chiles quipped. Chiles said that Cramer can bring Nixon, Agnew, Reagan, and anybody else he wants. ... I'll take Holland on my side against all of them."

Cramer said a Republican-majority Senate would lead to the removal of controversial Senator J. William Fulbright of Arkansas, the chairman of the Senate Foreign Relations Committee who had long opposed the Vietnam War. Chiles, however, retorted that if Republicans controlled the Senate other southern Democrats would also forfeit committee chairmanships earned through their seniority.

== United States senator ==
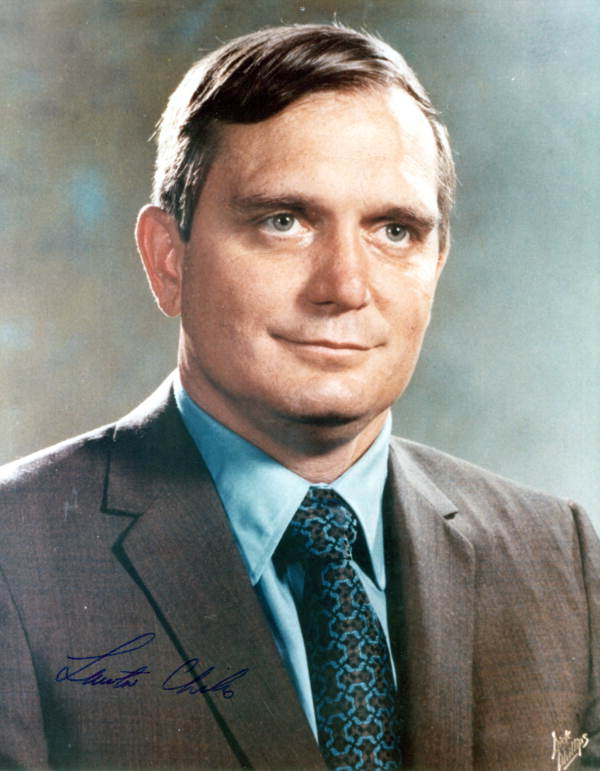
Chiles' official portrait as Senator

Chiles was twice re-elected to the U.S. Senate in 1976 and in 1982, both heavily Democratic years. Chiles, never flashy, was considered a moderate lawmaker who rarely made waves. He served as the chairman of the Special Committee on Aging of the 96th Congress (1979–1981), and in the 100th Congress (1987–1989) served as chairman of the influential Senate Budget Committee. While heading the Budget Committee, he played a key role in the 1987 revision of the Gramm-Rudman-Hollings Act.

In 1985, Chiles underwent quadruple-bypass heart surgery. After his recovery, he became increasingly frustrated with the slow pace of work in the Senate, complaining that it was too difficult to get anything done. Accordingly, he announced in December 1987 that he would not seek re-election the next year. Chiles was succeeded by Republican Connie Mack III.

== Governor of Florida ==
After the surgery, Chiles developed clinical depression, and was treated with Prozac. He retired from the Senate in 1989 and intended to retire from politics entirely. However, several supporters convinced him to enter the 1990 Florida governor's race against Republican incumbent Bob Martinez. During the Democratic Party primary, his opponent Bill Nelson attempted to make an issue of Chiles' age and health, a strategy that backfired badly in a state with a large population of retirees.

Chiles ran a campaign to "reinvent" the state's government, and defeated Martinez to take office in 1991. During his first term as governor, Chiles managed to accomplish very little. Although he developed ambitious health-care and tax reform packages, neither passed in the hostile state legislature. The early years of his term were troubled by a national economic recession that severely damaged Florida's tourism-based economy, and by Hurricane Andrew, which struck near Homestead in August 1992.

Chiles ran for re-election in the 1994 election against Republican Jeb Bush. During the campaign season, Bush ran a television advertisement which featured the mother of a teenage girl who had been abducted and murdered many years before. The mother stated that "Her killer is still on death row, and we're still waiting for justice. We won't get it from Lawton Chiles because he's too liberal on crime. . . Lawton Chiles has let us down. . . I know Jeb Bush. He'll make criminals serve their sentences and enforce the death penalty. Lawton Chiles won't," referring to Chiles not signing the convicted killer's death warrant. Chiles responded that he did not sign a death warrant because the case was still on appeal. The Democratic governor further claimed a record of support for the death penalty, having presided over 18 executions during his two terms (among them Judy Buenoano, the first Floridian woman executed since 1848). Moreover, after the botched electrocution of Pedro Medina in 1997, and despite significant public criticism, Chiles refused to endorse the use of lethal injection as a lawful form of execution. The new method was introduced under Bush's administration in 1999 after the execution of Allen Lee Davis.

The 1994 election was memorable for its series of debates between Bush and Chiles. During the last debate on November 1, Chiles said to Bush, "My momma told me, sticks and stones may break my bones, but names will never hurt me. But let me tell you something about the old liberal. The old he-coon walks just before the light of day." Bush and many others did not understand the reference, but the quote gained significant media attention. After the debate, Chiles remained oblique, saying "It's sort of like saying, "Don't mess with the Lone Ranger.'" The next day, Lt. Governor Buddy MacKay explained that the he-coon was the oldest and wiliest raccoon in the pack, according to Florida cracker folklore. Raccoons were hunted by the light of the moon, and the he-coon would wait all night while the young raccoons ran from the dogs, tiring them out. Then, just before the light of day, the he-coon would leave his lair and walk in the open, safe from the dogs. Chiles was implying that he was the he-coon, and just as the he-coon walked before dawn, he would score a comeback victory against Bush. The quip was a direct appeal to older, rural, ancestral Floridians, whose loyalty to Democratic candidates had waned over the past several decades. Seven days later, as Republicans swept the 1994 Florida elections in almost every respect, Chiles bucked the trend, winning reelection in an upset by about 64,000 votes, 1.52% of the total vote. He is the last Democrat to win a gubernatorial election in Florida. Chiles' "he-coon" quote has become a well-known moment in Florida politics, often recalled and referenced in headlines and Florida political debate. After the election Chiles admitted his campaign made scare calls in the final hours using phony organizations as fronts. The callers identified themselves as being from the nonexistent Citizens for Tax Fairness. One script accused Bush of being a tax cheat.

Chiles' second term as governor was notable as the first time in state history that a Democratic governor had a legislature controlled by the Republican Party. Despite this, he had some successes, including a successful lawsuit he and state attorney general Bob Butterworth filed against the tobacco industry, which resulted in an $11.3 billion settlement for the state. He also won approval for a $2.7 billion statewide school construction program.

In 1995, Chiles sought treatment for a neurological problem that was later diagnosed as a mild stroke after he awoke with nausea, slurred speech and loss of coordination; and it would be determined dehydration might have caused the episode. He recovered fully, which was credited to prompt treatment.

== Death ==
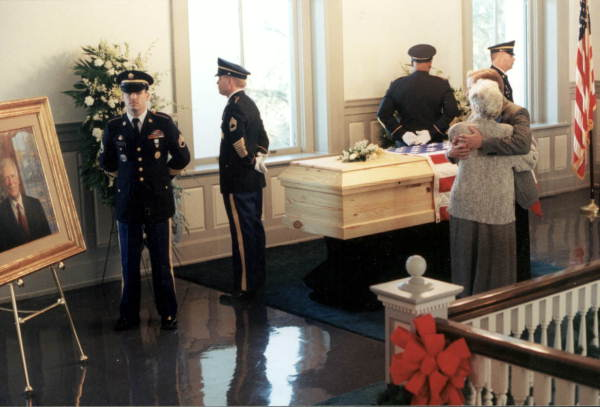
Rhea Chiles embracing her son Bud during the funeral of Lawton Chiles, on December 15, 1998

Ineligible to run a third time, Chiles supported the lieutenant governor, his personal friend Buddy MacKay, in the 1998 Florida governor's race against Jeb Bush. Bush, however, scored an easy victory over MacKay. On December 12 that year, just three weeks before his long-awaited retirement was to begin, Chiles suffered from an abnormal heart rhythm while exercising on a cycling machine in the Governor's Mansion gymnasium. He died suddenly shortly afterwards, at the age of 68.

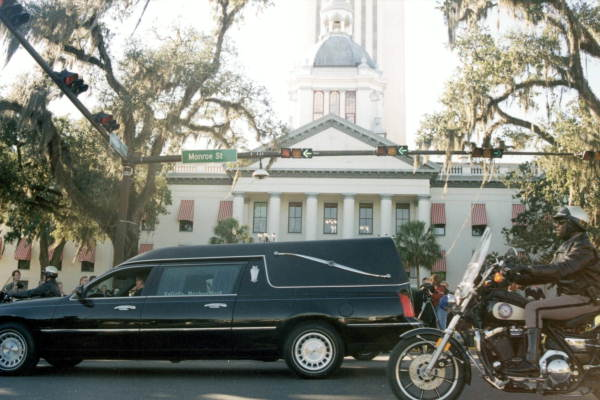
Chiles' funeral procession stops in front of the Florida State Capitol in Tallahassee, Florida

Funeral services were held at Faith Presbyterian Church in Tallahassee on December 16, 1998, following a funeral procession that traced part of his walk from the 1970 Senate campaign from the panhandle town of Century to Tallahassee. Chiles was initially buried in a church cemetery in Tallahassee; however, within a year his wife had the body moved to a 200-acre (81 ha) tract 15 miles (24 km) east of Tallahassee, a place they named Jubilee. He was succeeded in office by MacKay, who served until Bush's term began on January 5, 1999.

== Legacy ==
=== Legislative and executive programs ===
Chiles was known as a health care and children's advocate throughout his career. He emphasized health coverage for the uninsured and led a campaign to create the National Commission for Prevention of Infant Mortality in the late 1980s. In 1994, he fought for the creation of regional health care alliances throughout the state, which allow small businesses to pool their health care dollars and broaden coverage while saving money. He also created the Florida Department of Elder Affairs.

In 1992, Chiles created the Florida Healthy Start program to provide a comprehensive prenatal and infant care program available to all pregnant women and infants across the state; since the program's inception the state's infant mortality rate has dropped 18%. In 1996, Chiles appointed a Governor's Commission on Education to examine the state's school system. One of the significant recommendations that came from that commission eventually led to the highly controversial 2002 state constitutional amendment restricting Florida's school class sizes.

In 1997, anti-abortion advocacy group Choose Life collected 10,000 signatures and filed the $30,000 fee required under Florida law at the time to submit an application for a new specialty plate. State Senator Tom Lee sponsored a bill in support of the tag's creation. The bill passed both houses of the Florida State Legislature in early 1998, but was vetoed by Chiles, who stated that license plates are not the "proper forum for debate" on political issues.

=== Judicial appointments ===
Perhaps his greatest legacy was his impact on the Florida Supreme Court, where his appointments continued to have a major impact on state and national events long after Chiles' death. Chiles appointed Justice Major B. Harding in 1991, Justice Charles T. Wells in 1994, Justice Harry Lee Anstead in 1994, Justice Barbara J. Pariente in 1997, and Justice R. Fred Lewis in 1998. Chiles and incoming governor Jeb Bush jointly appointed Justice Peggy A. Quince in 1998 just a few days before Chiles' death. Quince was jointly appointed because her term as Justice would begin the exact moment that Bush's first term as governor began, so there was a legal question which governor had the authority to appoint her. Bush and Chiles agreed to make a joint appointment to avoid a lawsuit over the question.

Thus, at one point, Chiles had appointed five of the seven Justices and had jointly appointed the sixth. Chiles' appointments formed the Supreme Court majorities that decided the following major cases:

- In 2006, the Court struck down a law passed by the Florida State Legislature that had created the United States' first statewide education voucher program. The majority in this case consisted of Wells, Anstead, Pariente, Lewis, and Quince. Bush appointees Raoul G. Cantero and Kenneth B. Bell dissented.
- In 2004, the court struck down another piece of legislation from the Florida legislature designed to reverse a lower court decision in the Terri Schiavo case. This decision was unanimous and included Bush appointees Cantero and Bell. By this time, Harding had retired.
- In the 2000 presidential election controversy, the Florida Supreme Court ordered a statewide recount in the disputed election pitting George W. Bush against Al Gore. The United States Supreme Court later reversed that ruling. The Florida Supreme Court majority in this case consisted of Anstead, Pariente, Lewis, and Quince. Dissenting Justices were Wells, Harding, and Leander J. Shaw Jr., an appointee of Governor Bob Graham. Shaw retired in early 2003 and was replaced by Bell.

Lawton Chiles Middle Academy

LCMA, a public magnet school in Chile’s’ hometown of Lakeland, Florida, was renamed for him after his death. The school is located in the former Lakeland Senior High School building from which Chiles graduated in 1948.

=== Lawton Chiles High School ===
A high school in Tallahassee, Florida, opening in 1999, Lawton Chiles High School was named after Chiles. It still retains the name to today.

== Relatives ==
Chiles' niece was former U.S. senator Kay Hagan of North Carolina, a Democrat elected in 2008. Hagan was the daughter of Chiles' sister Jeannette. Chiles' son, "Bud" Chiles, ran for the position of Governor of Florida without party affiliation in a grassroots campaign. Like his father, Bud embarked on a walking tour of the state, listening and visiting with local communities in Florida. On September 2, 2010, Chiles dropped out of the race citing "continuing down this road could have unintended consequences, dividing those who hold common goals..." Chiles threw his support behind Alex Sink.

== Electoral history ==
Democratic primary for United States Senator from Florida, 1970

- C. Farris Bryant – 240,222 (32.90%)
- Lawton Chiles – 188,300 (25.79%)
- Fred Schultz – 175,745 (24.07%)
- Alcee Hastings – 91,948 (12.59%)
- Joel Daves – 33,939 (4.65%)

Democratic runoff for United States Senator from Florida, 1970

- Lawton Chiles – 474,420 (65.74%)
- C. Farris Bryant – 247,211 (34.26%)

1970 United States Senate election in Florida

- Lawton Chiles (D) – 902,438 (53.87%)
- William C. Cramer (R) – 772,817 (46.13%)

1976 United States Senate election in Florida

- Lawton Chiles (D, Inc.) – 1,799,518 (62.98%)
- John Grady (R) – 1,057,886 (37.02%)

1982 United States Senate election in Florida

- Lawton Chiles (D, Inc.) – 1,637,667 (61.72%)
- Van Poole (R) – 1,015,330 (38.27%)

Democratic primary for Governor of Florida, 1990

- Lawton Chiles – 746,325 (69.49%)
- Bill Nelson – 327,731 (30.51%)

1990 Florida gubernatorial election

- Lawton Chiles/Buddy MacKay (D) – 1,995,206 (56.51%)
- Bob Martinez (Inc.)/J. Allison DeFoor (R) – 1,535,068 (43.48%)

Democratic primary for Governor of Florida, 1994

- Lawton Chiles (Inc.) – 603,657 (72.17%)
- Jack Gargan – 232,757 (27.83%)

1994 Florida gubernatorial election

- Lawton Chiles/Buddy MacKay (D, Inc.) – 2,135,008 (50.75%)
- Jeb Bush/Tom Feeney (R) – 2,071,068 (49.23%)

== See also ==
- The Florida Wildlife Corridor Expedition
- Lawton Chiles High School
- Lawton Chiles Legal Information Center

== Videos ==
(1) Funeral Services for Governor Chiles at Christ Presbyterian Church on December 16, 1998 Governor Lawton Chiles Funeral | C-SPAN.org

(2) Chiles' 8th & final State of the State Address from March 3, 1998 Florida State of the State Address | March 3, 1998 | Video | C-SPAN.org

(3) Opening Plenary of the Winter Meeting of the National Governors Association from February 22, 1998 Opening Plenary | Video | C-SPAN.org

(4) Tobacco Settlement and Medicaid Funds from December 8, 1997 Tobacco Settlement and Medicaid Funds

(5) Health Care Fraud Prevention from March 25, 1997 Health Care Fraud Prevention | Video | C-SPAN.org

(6) Chiles' 7th State of the State Address from March 4, 1997 Florida State of the State Address | March 4, 1997 | Video | C-SPAN.org

(7) Chiles' 6th State of the State Address from March 5, 1996 Florida State of the State Address | March 5, 1996 | Video | C-SPAN.org

(8) Prescription for Disaster from May 11, 1995 Prescription for Disaster | C-SPAN.org

(9) Inauguration Address from January 3, 1995 1/3/95 Inauguration Ceremony for Governor Lawton Chiles - The Florida Channel

(10) Governor Chiles' victory speech after getting re-elected from November 8, 1994 Florida Gubernatorial Victory Speech | Video | C-SPAN.org

(11) Florida Gubernatorial Debate from November 1, 1994

(12) Florida Gubernatorial Debate from October 18, 1994

(13) Florida Gubernatorial Debate from October 4, 1994 Florida Gubernatorial Debate | October 4, 1994 | Video | C-SPAN.org

(14) Chiles' 4th State of the State Address from February 10, 1994

(15) Chiles' 2nd State of the State Address from January 14, 1992

(16) Chiles' 1st State of the State Address from March 5, 1991

(17) Inauguration Address on January 8, 1991 1/8/91 Inauguration Ceremony for Governor Lawton Chiles - The Florida Channel

Florida House of Representatives
Preceded by Roy Surles	Member of the Florida House of Representatives from Polk County, Group 1; 1958–1966	Succeeded by John R. Clark
Florida Senate
Preceded by B. C. Pearce	Member of the Florida Senate from the 26th district 1966–1967	Succeeded by Louis De la Parte
Preceded by E. William Gautier	Member of the Florida Senate from the 28th district 1967–1970	Succeeded by Bob Brannen
U.S. Senate
Preceded by Spessard Holland	U.S. senator (Class 1) from Florida; 1971–1989; Served alongside: Edward J. Gurney, Richard Stone, Paula Hawkins, Bob Graham	Succeeded by Connie Mack
Political offices
Preceded by Frank Church; Idaho	Chairman of the Senate Aging Committee; 1979–1981	Succeeded by H. John Heinz III; Pennsylvania
Preceded by Pete Domenici; New Mexico	Chairman of the Senate Budget Committee; 1987–1989	Succeeded by Jim Sasser; Tennessee
Preceded by Robert Martinez	Governor of Florida; January 8, 1991 – December 12, 1998	Succeeded by Buddy MacKay
Party political offices
Preceded by Spessard Holland	Democratic Party nominee for United States Senator (Class 1) from Florida; 1970, 1976, 1982	Succeeded by Buddy MacKay
Preceded by Steve Pajcic	Democratic Party Nominee for Governor of Florida; 1990, 1994	Succeeded by Buddy MacKay
