= Van Poole =

American politician

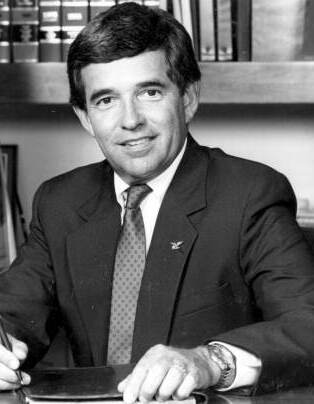

Chair of the Florida Republican Party
- In office 1989–1993
- Preceded by: Jeanie Austin
- Succeeded by: Tom Slade Jr.

Member of the Florida Senate from the 30th district
- In office 1978–1982
- Preceded by: Jon Thomas
- Succeeded by: Tom McPherson

Member of the Florida House of Representatives from the 84th district
- In office 1972–1978
- Preceded by: George Caldwell
- Succeeded by: Tom Bush

Member of the Florida House of Representatives from the 88th district
- In office 1970–1972
- Preceded by: Joseph M. Martinez Jr.
- Succeeded by: Randy Avon

Personal details
- Born: July 5, 1935 (age 91) Jackson, Tennessee, U.S.
- Party: Republican
- Spouse: Donna Maggert
- Children: 4
- Education: Memphis State University (BS)

Military service
- Allegiance: United States
- Branch: United States Army Reserve
- Service years: 1953–1961

Van B. Poole (born July 5, 1935) is a former Republican politician from Florida.

== Biography ==
Born in Jackson, the seat of Madison County in western Tennessee, he graduated in 1958 from Memphis State University in Memphis, Tennessee. He relocated to Florida in 1963.

From 1953 to 1961, Poole served in the United States Army Reserve. From 1971 to 1979, he was a member of the Florida House of Representatives from Broward County in south Florida. He was elected to the state House in the same election in which his fellow Republicans, Governor Claude R. Kirk, Jr., and U.S. Representative William C. Cramer of St. Petersburg, lost. For two years, he was the House Minority Whip. From 1979 to 1983, he was a member of the Florida Senate. In 1982, he received 38.3 percent of the general election vote in his challenge to Democratic U.S. Senator Lawton Chiles, who won his third and final term in the body. Chiles was first elected in 1970, when he defeated Cramer. Poole ran for Treasurer of Florida in 1986, but lost to Bill Gunter.

Under the Republican Governor Bob Martinez, Poole was the director of the Florida Department of Business Regulation. From 1989 to 1993, he chaired the Florida Republican Party. In 2001, then Governor Jeb Bush appointed him to the Federal Judicial Nomination Commission, headed by former Governor Martinez.

Poole spent twenty years as an insurance executive with Krieg Kostas & Poole and is currently a lobbyist with Dutko Poole McKinley.

He resides in Fort Lauderdale in Broward County, Florida

Florida House of Representatives
Preceded by Joseph M. Martinez Jr.	Member of the Florida House of Representatives from the 88th district 1970–1972	Succeeded by Randy Avon
Preceded by George Caldwell	Member of the Florida House of Representatives from the 84th district 1972–1978	Succeeded by Tom Bush
Florida Senate
Preceded by Jon Thomas	Member of the Florida Senate from the 30th district 1978–1982	Succeeded by Tom McPherson
Party political offices
Preceded by John Grady	Republican nominee for United States Senator from Florida (Class 1); 1982	Succeeded by Connie Mack III
Preceded by Jeffrey L. Latham (1978)	Republican nominee for Treasurer of Florida; 1986	Succeeded by Tom Gallagher
Preceded by Jeanie Austin	Chair of the Florida Republican Party; 1989–1993	Succeeded by Tom Slade Jr.
