= Karen Coolman =

American politician (born 1947)

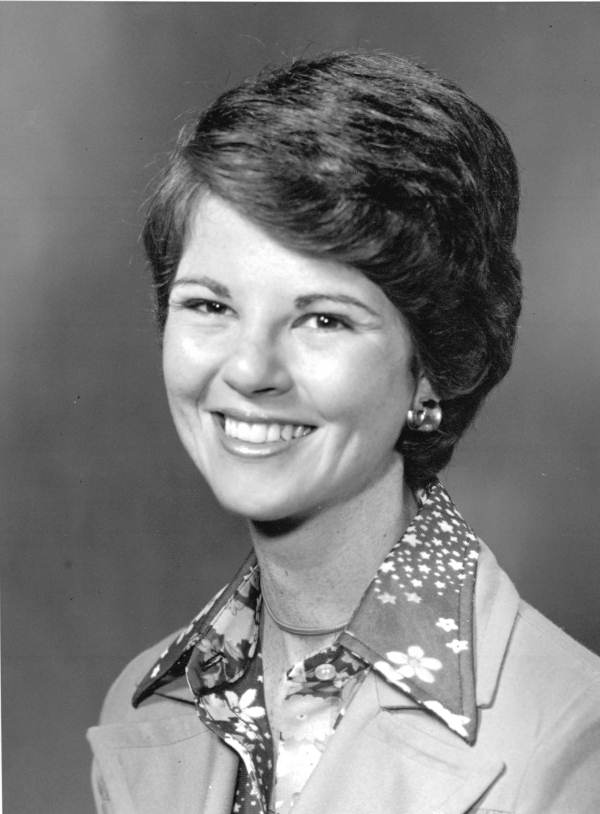
- Coolman in 1974

Member of the Florida House of Representatives from the 86th district
- In office 1974–1976
- Preceded by: Jon Thomas
- Succeeded by: Linda Cox

Personal details
- Born: August 26, 1947 (age 79) Norfolk, Virginia, U.S.
- Party: Democratic
- Spouse: Charles Douglas
- Education: Michigan State University

Karen B. Coolman (born August 26, 1947) is an American politician. She served as a Democratic member for the 86th district of the Florida House of Representatives.

== Life and career ==
Coolman was born in Norfolk, Virginia. She attended Michigan State University.

In 1974, Coolman was elected to represent the 86th district of the Florida House of Representatives, succeeding Jon Thomas. She served until 1976, when she was succeeded by Linda Cox.
