= 1982 United States Senate election in Florida =

- November 2, 1982
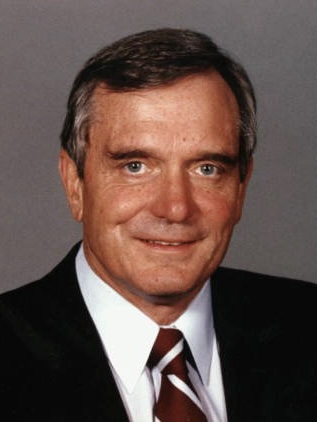

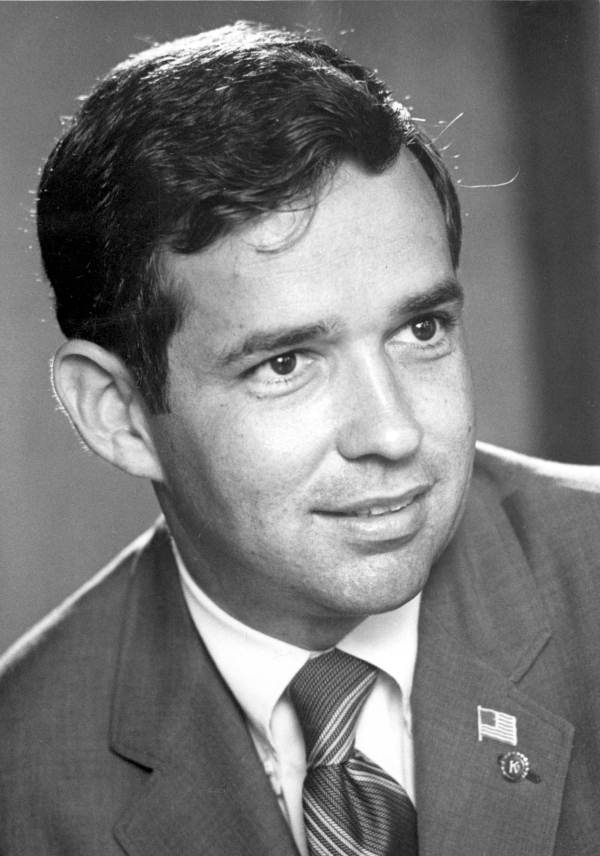
Nominee	Lawton Chiles	Van Poole
Party	Democratic	Republican
Popular vote	1,637,667	1,015,330
Percentage	61.72%	38.26%
- County results Chiles: 50–60% 60–70% 70–80% 80–90% Poole: 50–60% 60–70%
U.S. senator before election
Lawton Chiles
Democratic
Elected U.S. Senator
Lawton Chiles
Democratic

The 1982 United States Senate election in Florida was held on November 2, 1982. Incumbent Democratic U.S. Senator Lawton Chiles won re-election to a third term.

== Democratic primary ==
=== Candidates ===
- Lawton Chiles, incumbent U.S. Senator

=== Results ===
Democratic primary results
Party	Candidate	Votes	%
Democratic	Lawton Chiles (incumbent)	1,044,246	100.00%

== Republican primary ==
=== Candidates ===
- David H. Bludworth, Palm Beach County State Attorney since 1973
- Van Poole, State Senator from Fort Lauderdale
- George Snyder, former Democratic Maryland State Senator and candidate for Maryland governor in 1974

=== Results ===
Republican primary results
Party	Candidate	Votes	%
Republican	Van Poole	154,163	41.57%
Republican	David H. Bludworth	116,040	31.29%
Republican	George Snyder	100,609	27.13%
Total votes		370,812	100.00%

Republican primary runoff results
Party	Candidate	Votes	%
Republican	Van Poole	131,655	58.08%
Republican	David H. Bludworth	95,035	41.92%
Total votes		226,690	100.00%

== General election ==
=== Candidates ===
- Lawton Chiles (D), incumbent U.S. Senator
- Van Poole (R), State Senator

=== Results ===
General election results
Party	Candidate	Votes	%	±%
Democratic	Lawton Chiles (incumbent)	1,637,667	61.72%	−1.26%
Republican	Van Poole	1,015,330	38.26%	+1.24%
Write-in		422	0.02%	N/A
Majority		622,337	23.45%	−2.50%
Total votes		2,653,419	100.00%	
Democratic hold		Swing		

==== County results ====
County	Lawton Chiles Democratic	Van Poole Republican	Jim Fair Write-in	Jim Fair Write-in	Total
Alachua	21,263	6,927	1	8	28,199
Baker	2,028	520	0	0	2,548
Bay	10,783	8,362	0	0	19,145
Bradford	3,308	1,037	0	0	4,345
Brevard	46,892	37,974	0	16	84,882
Broward	204,272	105,482	0	30	309,784
Calhoun	2,190	584	0	0	2,774
Charlotte	12,483	13,612	0	1	26,096
Citrus	11,943	7,993	0	1	19,937
Clay	7,477	5,057	0	0	12,534
Collier	10,353	16,718	0	0	27,071
Columbia	5,309	2,261	0	0	7,570
Dade	246,797	99,806	0	8	346,611
Desoto	2,707	1,519	0	0	4,226
Dixie	1,791	321	2	1	2,115
Duval	78,383	35,660	0	8	114,051
Escambia	32,518	14,938	2	1	47,459
Flagler	2,854	1,776	0	0	4,630
Franklin	1,344	547	0	0	1,891
Gadsden	6,482	1,720	0	0	8,202
Gilchrist	1,460	393	0	2	1,855
Glades	1,105	393	0	0	1,498
Gulf	1,918	801	0	0	2,719
Hamilton	1,373	446	0	0	1,819
Hardee	2,542	1,141	0	1	3,684
Hendry	2,670	1,399	1	0	4,070
Hernando	12,378	8,166	0	0	20,544
Highlands	9,185	6,791	0	0	15,976
Hillsborough	98,939	47,994	6	16	146,955
Holmes	2,408	1,215	0	0	3,623
Indian River	9,977	10,323	0	0	20,300
Jackson	6,629	2,525	0	0	9,154
Jefferson	2,289	737	0	0	3,026
Lafayette	1,346	344	0	0	1,690
Lake	16,014	15,379	1	1	31,395
Lee	39,476	43,936	2	11	83,425
Leon	29,400	11,092	10	22	40,524
Levy	3,704	1,283	0	0	4,987
Liberty	978	351	0	0	1,329
Madison	3,165	949	0	0	4,114
Manatee	26,540	23,849	4	4	50,397
Marion	19,119	13,695	2	2	32,818
Martin	12,065	13,235	1	2	25,303
Monroe	10,034	5,081	0	0	15,115
Nassau	4,204	1,846	0	1	6,051
Okaloosa	12,174	11,517	1	9	23,701
Okeechobee	3,212	1,435	0	0	4,647
Orange	57,521	47,516	0	20	105,057
Osceola	7,951	6,311	1	0	14,263
Palm Beach	125,701	81,484	0	40	207,225
Pasco	45,725	31,006	2	6	76,739
Pinellas	148,669	110,856	73	36	259,634
Polk	49,183	24,993	1	6	74,183
Putnam	7,597	3,485	0	1	11,083
Santa Rosa	9,398	4,635	7	8	14,048
Sarasota	38,013	41,457	5	10	79,485
Seminole	21,157	22,065	0	8	43,230
St. Johns	7,350	5,165	0	0	12,515
St. Lucie	14,479	11,703	0	2	26,184
Sumter	3,425	1,551	0	1	4,977
Suwannee	3,817	1,481	1	0	5,299
Taylor	2,989	1,026	0	0	4,015
Union	1,191	301	1	2	1,495
Volusia	38,291	25,995	3	5	64,294
Wakulla	2,414	956	3	0	3,373
Walton	3,754	956	0	0	4,710
Washington	2,751	1,468	0	0	4,219
Federal Absentee	810	779	0	2	1,589
Total	1,637,667	1,015,330	130	292	2,653,419

== See also ==
- 1982 United States Senate elections
