= George Caldwell (Florida politician) =

American politician

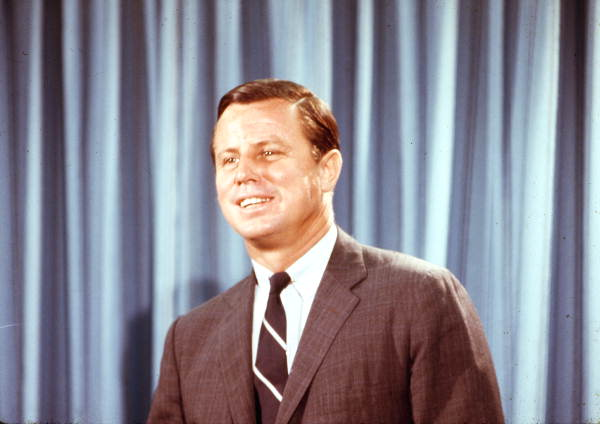
- Caldwell in 1969

Member of the Florida House of Representatives from the 84th district
- In office 1967–1972
- Preceded by: District established
- Succeeded by: Van Poole

Personal details
- Born: February 3, 1933 New York City, U.S.
- Died: March 3, 2014 (aged 81)
- Party: Republican
- Spouse: Jean Bridges (m. 1955; died. 2002)
- Education: Princeton University

George L. Caldwell (February 3, 1933 – March 3, 2014) was an American politician. He served as a Republican member for the 84th district of the Florida House of Representatives.

== Life and career ==
Caldwell was born in New York City, the son of William W. Caldwell. He attended Trinity School, St. Paul's School and Princeton University. He served in the United States Navy.

In 1967, Caldwell was elected as the first representative for the newly-established 84th district of the Florida House of Representatives. He served until 1972, when he was succeeded by Van Poole.

Caldwell died in March 2014 at his home, at the age of 81.
