= First ladies of Florida =

Hostess of the Florida Governor's Mansion

First Lady of Florida
- Seal of Florida

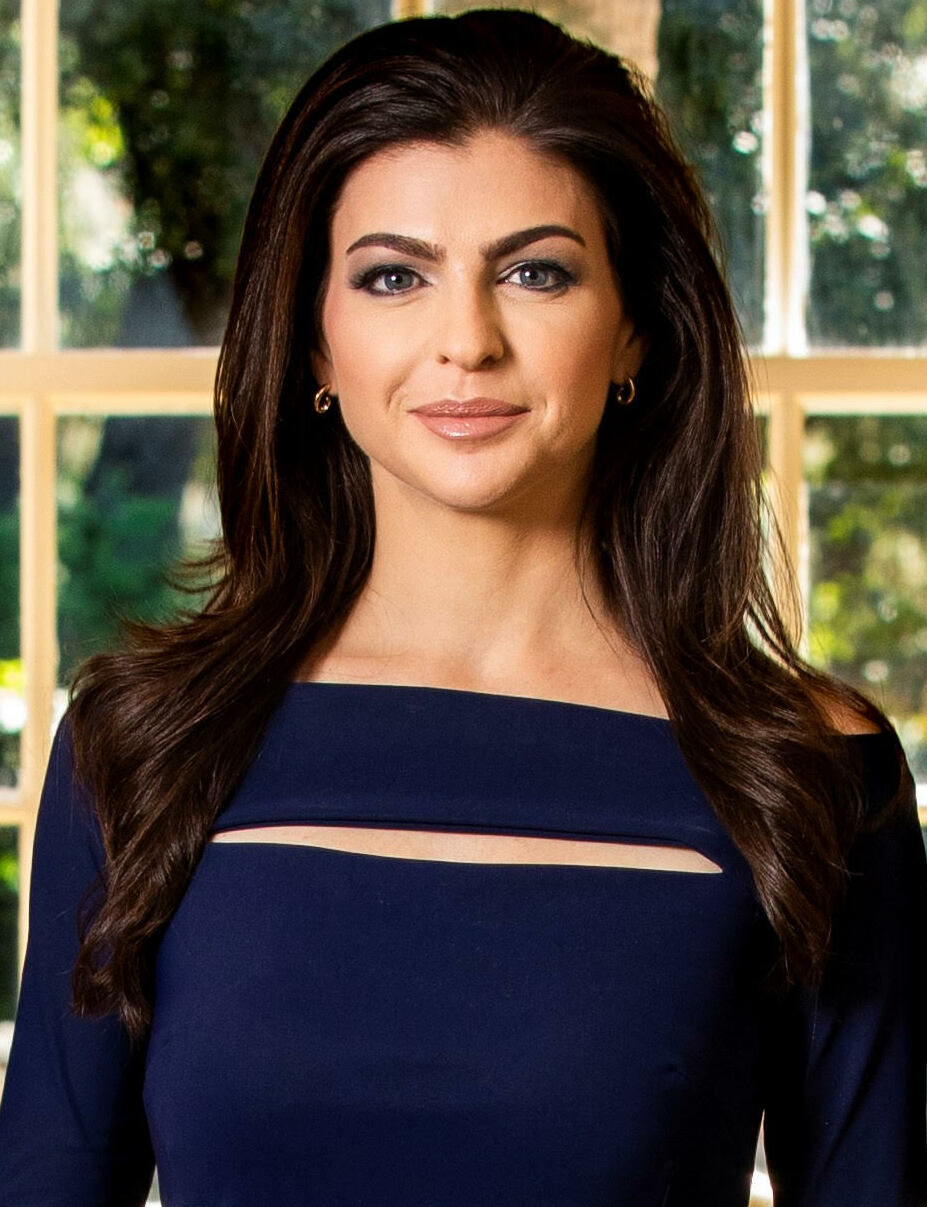
- Current; Casey DeSantis since January 8, 2019
- Style: First Lady
- Residence: Florida Governor's Mansion
- Term length: Four years, renewable once consecutively
- Inaugural holder: Rachel Donelson Jackson
- Formation: January 3, 1959 (67 years ago)

The first lady of Florida is the hostess of the Florida Governor's Mansion, usually the spouse of the governor of Florida, concurrent with the governor's term in office. Casey DeSantis is the current first lady of Florida, assuming the position on January 8, 2019, as the wife of 46th and current Florida governor Ron DeSantis, with whom she has three children.

== History ==
Rhoda Elizabeth Waller Gibbes, the mother of Florida governor Albert Gilchrist, served as first lady of Florida from 1909 to 1912, and pushed for a monument to the American Civil War Battle of Olustee.

In 2019, Casey DeSantis established the First Lady's Medal for Courage, Commitment, and Service.

== First ladies of Florida ==
- Casey DeSantis (2019–present)
- Ann Scott (2011–2019)
- Carole Crist (2008–2011)
- Columba Bush (1999–2007)
- Anne Selph MacKay (1998-1999)
- Rhea Chiles (1991–1998)
- Mary Jane Martinez (1987-1991)
- Margie Mixson (1987)
- Adele Khoury Graham (1979–1987)
- Donna Lou Harper Askew (1971–1978)
- Erika Mattfeld Kirk (1967–1970)
- Mildred Carlyon Burns (1965–1967)
- Julia Burnett Bryant (1961–1964)
- Mary Call Darby Collins (1955–1960)
- Thelma Brinson Johns (September 28, 1953 – 1954)
- Olie Brown McCarty (1953–September 28, 1953)
- Barbara Manning Warren (1949–1952)
- Mary Rebecca Harwood Caldwell (1945–1949)
- Mary Agnes Groover Holland (1941–1944)
- Mildred Victoria Thompson Cone (1937–1942)
- Alice May Agee Sholtz (1933–1936)
- Nell Ray Carlton (1929–1932)
- Lottie Wilt Pepper Martin (1925–1928)
- Maude Randell Hardee (1921–1925)
- Alice May Campbell Catts (1917–1920)
- Virginia Darby Trammel (1913–1916)
- Rhoda Elizabeth Waller Gibbes, mother of governor Albert Gilchrist who was a bachelor (1909–1912)
- Annie Isabell Douglass (1905–1908)
- May Mann Jennings (1901–1904)
- Mary C. Davis Bloxham (1897–1900)
- Mary Eugenia Spencer Mitchell (1893–1896)
- Floride Lydia Pearson Fleming (1889–1892)
- Wathen Herbert Taylor Perry (1885–1888)
- Mary C. Davis Bloxham (1881–1884)
- Ameila Dickens Drew (1877–1881)
- Marcellus Lovejoy Stearns was a bachelor (March 1874 – 1876)
- Catherine Smith Campbell Hart (1873–March 18, 1874)
- Chloe Merrick Reed (1868–1872)
- Philoclea Alson Walker (December 20, 1865 – July 4, 1868)
- Harriett Newell Marvin (July 13, 1865 – December 20, 1865)
- Elizabeth S. Coleman Allison (April 1, 1865 – May 19, 1865)
- Caroline Howze Milton (October 7, 1861 – April 1, 1865)
- Martha Starke Peay Perry (October 5, 1857 – October 7, 1861)
- Mary M. Scott Broome (October 3, 1853 – October 5, 1857)
- Elizabeth Simpson Brown (October 1, 1849 – October 3, 1853)
- William Dunn Moseley was a widower (June 25, 1845 – October 1, 1849)

=== Territorial period ===
- Elizabeth Foort Branch (August 11, 1844 – June 25, 1845)
- Mary Letitia Kirkman Call (March 19, 1841 – August 11, 1844)
- Mary Marth Smith Reid (December 2, 1839 – March 19, 1841)
- Mary Letitia Kirkman Call (March 16, 1836 – December 2, 1839)
- Peggy O'Neale Timberlake Eaton (April 24, 1834 – March 16, 1836)
- Nancy Hines Duval (April 17, 1822 – April 24, 1834)
- Rachel Donelson Jackson (March 10, 1821 – November 12, 1821)

== Gallery ==
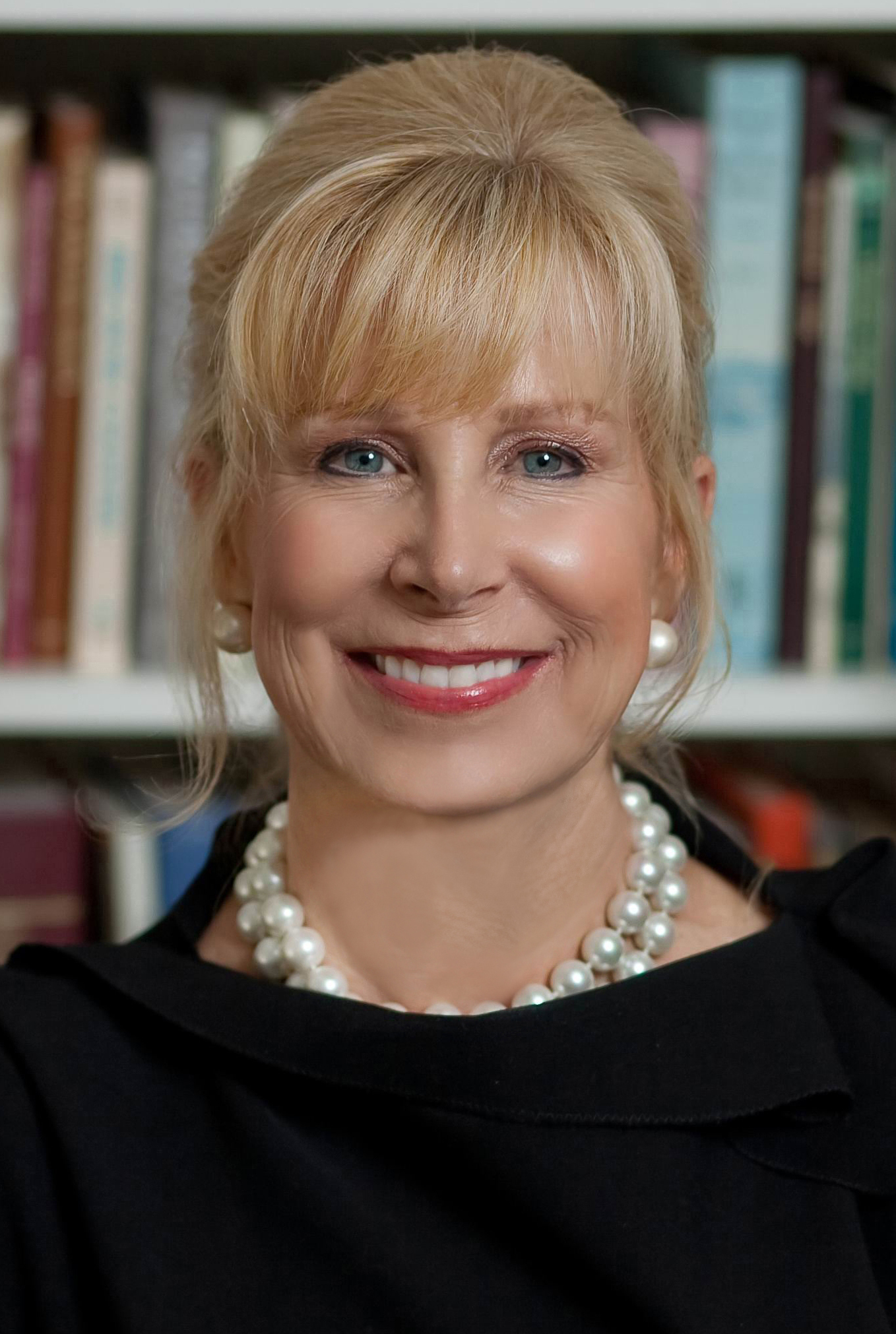
Ann Scott
served 2011–2019

Carole Crist
served 2008–2011

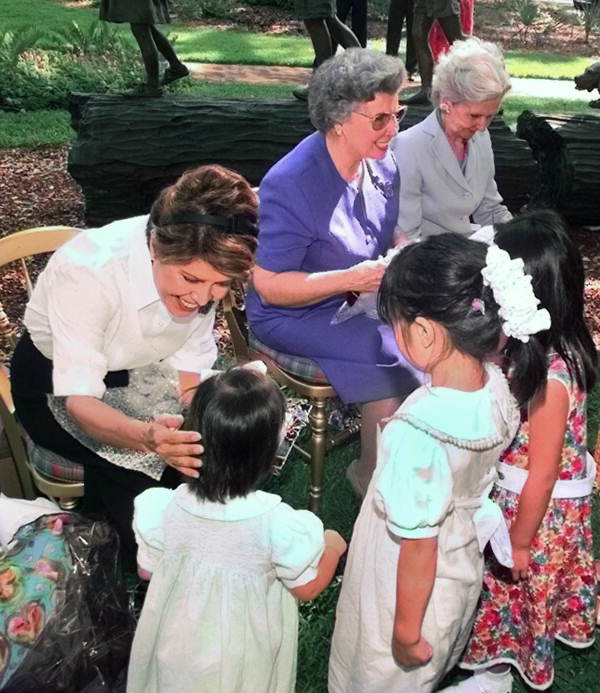
Columba Bush, Donna Lou Askew, and Rhea Chiles greeting children at the Florida Governor's Mansion

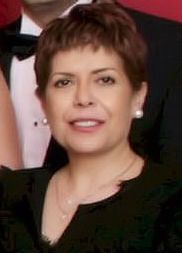
Columba Bush
served 1999–2007

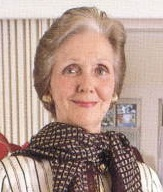
Rhea Chiles
served 1991–1998

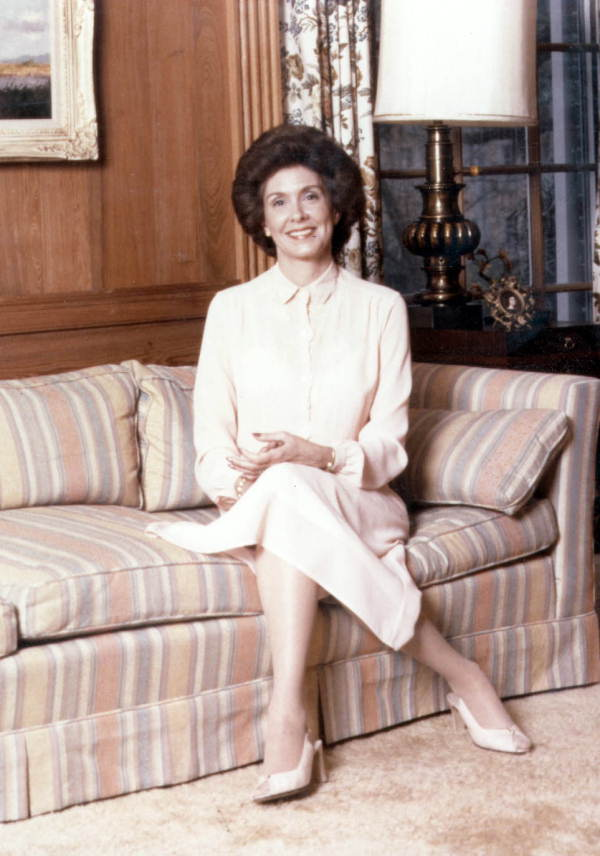
Adele Khoury Graham
served 1979–1987

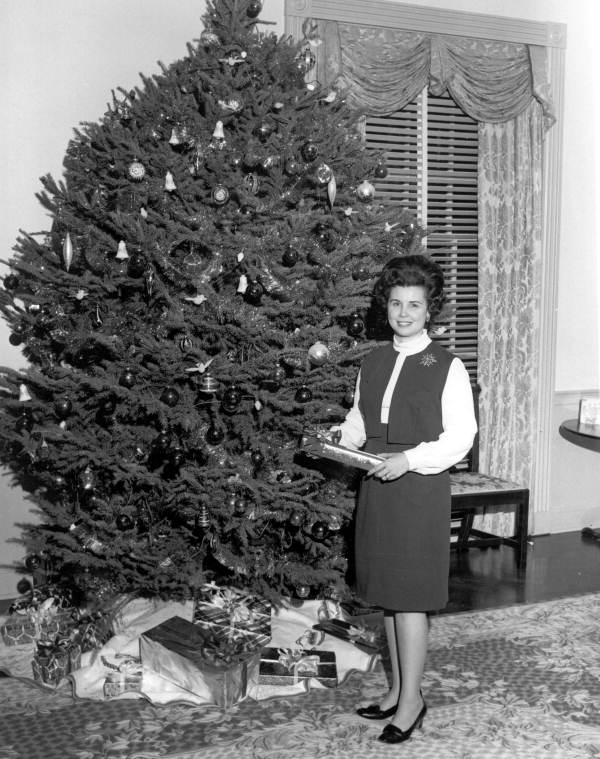
Donna Lou Harper Askew

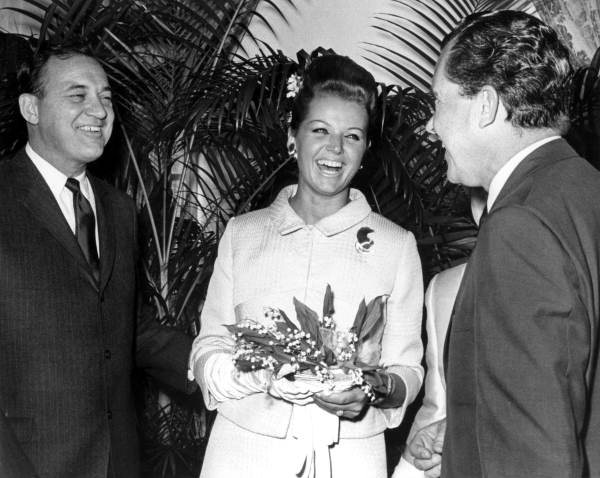
Erika Mattfield Kirk between Claude Kirk and Richard Nixon

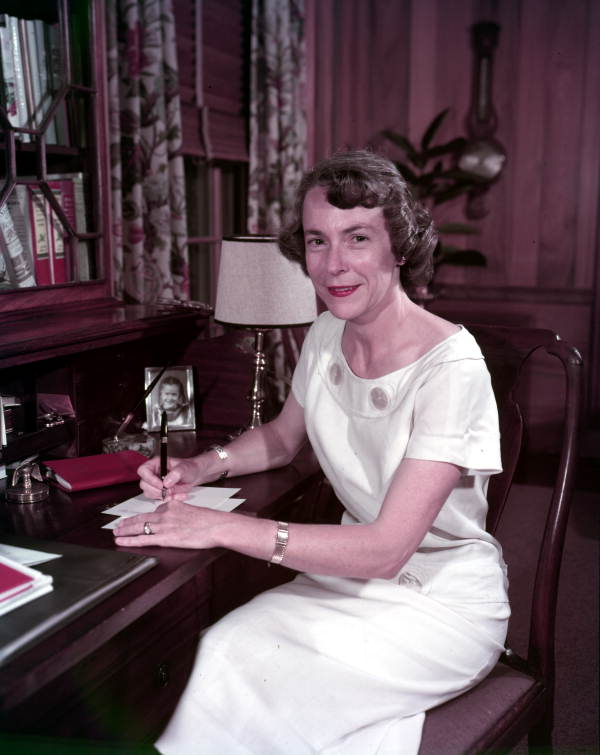
Mary Call Darby Collins

== See also ==
- List of current United States first spouses
