= 1976 United States Senate election in Florida =

- November 2, 1976
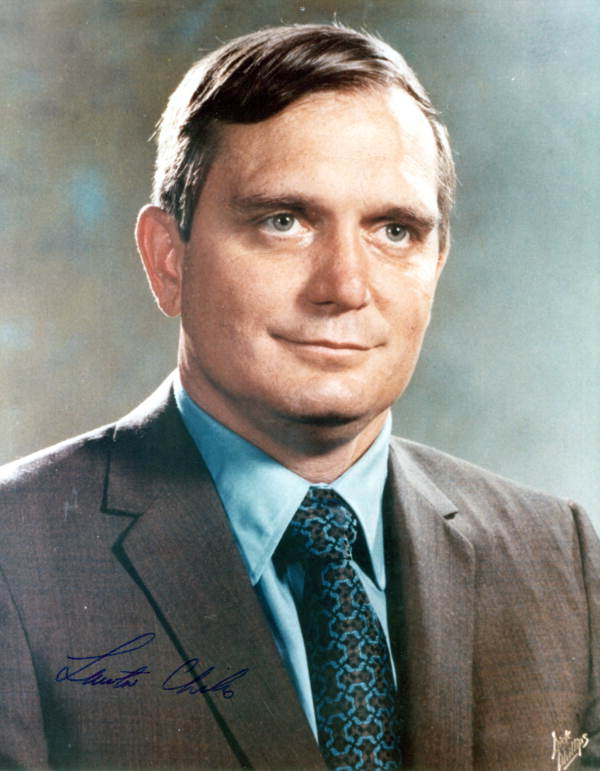

Nominee	Lawton Chiles	John Grady
Party	Democratic	Republican
Popular vote	1,799,518	1,057,886
Percentage	62.98%	37.02%
- County results Chiles: 50–60% 60–70% 70–80% 80–90% Grady: 50–60%
U.S. senator before election
Lawton Chiles
Democratic
Elected U.S. Senator
Lawton Chiles
Democratic

The 1976 United States Senate election in Florida was held on November 2, 1976. Incumbent Democratic U.S. Senator Lawton Chiles won re-election to a second term.

== Republican primary ==
3.7% of the voting age population participated in the Republican primary.

=== Candidates ===
- John Grady, Mayor of Belle Glade, family physician, and the American Independent Party's nominee for U.S. Senate in 1974
- Walter Sims, State Senator
- Helen S. Hanel, lawyer.

=== Results ===
Republican Primary – September 7, 1976
Party	Candidate	Votes	%
Republican	John Grady	164,644	54.51%
Republican	Walter Sims	74,684	24.73%
Republican	Helen S. Hansel	62,718	20.76%
Total votes		414,207	100

== General election ==
=== Candidates ===
- Timothy L. "Tim" Adams (Independent)
- Lawton Chiles, incumbent U.S. Senator (Democratic)
- John Grady, Mayor of Belle Glade (Republican)
- Ed Ice (Independent)

=== Results ===
Chiles won in a landslide, dominating most geographic areas of the state. Grady won only Collier County.

United States Senate Election in Florida, 1976
Party	Candidate	Votes	%
Democratic	Lawton Chiles (incumbent)	1,799,518	62.98%
Republican	John Grady	1,057,886	37.02%
Write-in		130	0.00%
Majority		741,632	25.96%
Turnout		2,857,534	77%
Democratic hold			

== See also ==
- 1976 United States Senate elections

== Works cited ==
- Steed, Robert; Moreland, Laurence; Baker, Tod, eds. (1980). Party Politics in the South. Praeger Publishers. ISBN 0030565863.
