= Charles Weber (politician) =

American politician

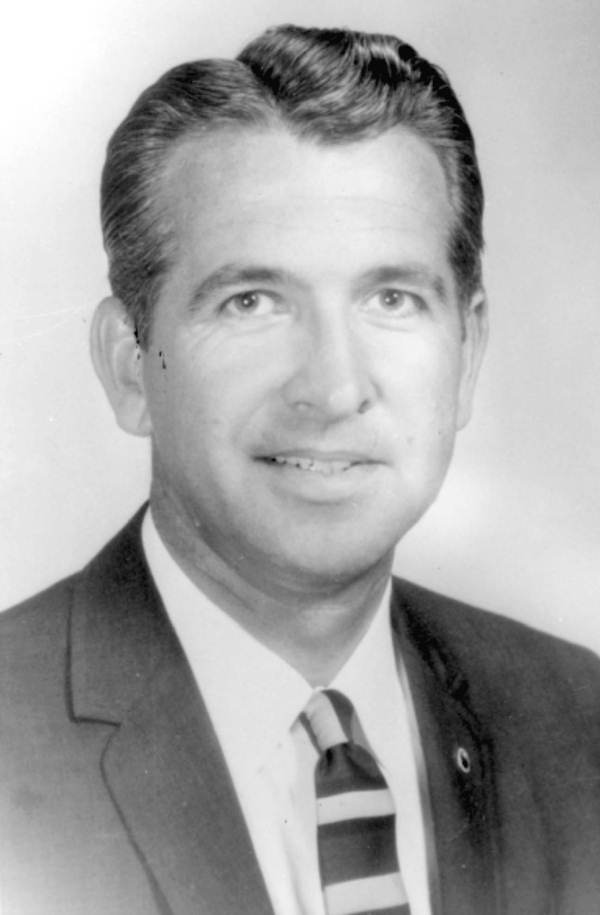
- Weber in 1968

Member of the Florida Senate from the 37th district
- In office 1967–1972
- Preceded by: Jim Dressler
- Succeeded by: Ken Myers

Member of the Florida Senate from the 30th district
- In office 1972–1974
- Preceded by: Cliff Reuter
- Succeeded by: Jon Thomas

Personal details
- Born: October 5, 1923 Detroit, Michigan, U.S.
- Died: 1989 (aged 65)
- Party: Republican
- Spouse: Elaine Weber
- Children: 6
- Education: University of Detroit; University of Minnesota; American University in France

Charles H. Weber (October 5, 1923 – 1989) was an American politician. He served as a Republican member for the 30th and 37th district of the Florida Senate.

== Life and career ==
Weber was born in Detroit, Michigan. He attended the University of Detroit, the University of Minnesota and the American University in France.

In 1967, Weber was elected to represent the 37th district of the Florida Senate, serving until 1972. In the same year, he was elected to represent the 30th district, serving until 1974.

Weber died in 1989 of cancer, at the age of 65.
