= Columba Bush =

Mexican and American philanthropist (born 1953)

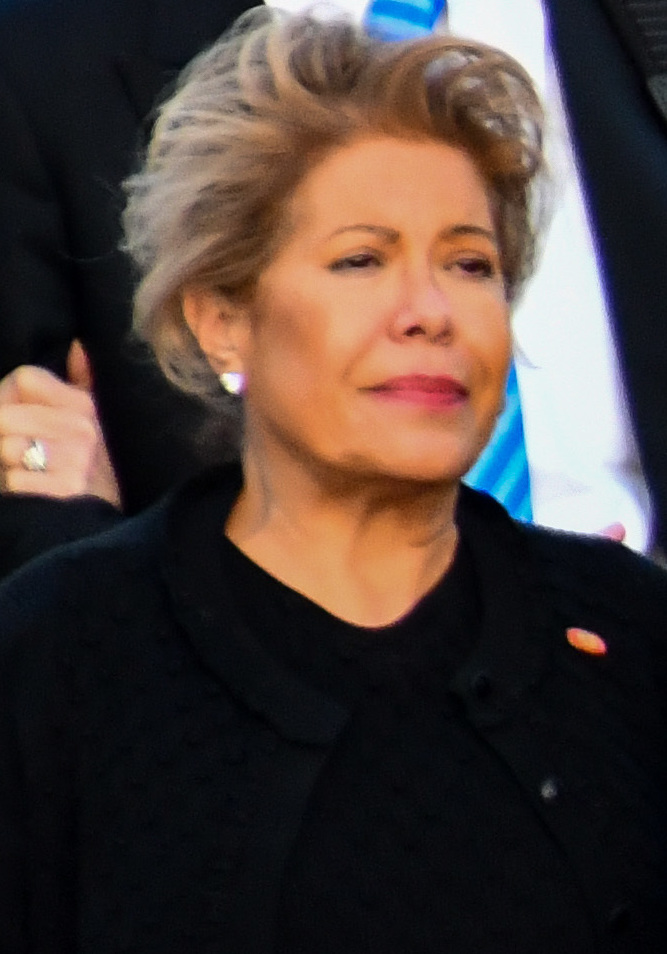
- Bush in 2018

First Lady of Florida
- In role January 5, 1999 – January 2, 2007
- Governor: Jeb Bush
- Preceded by: Anne Selph
- Succeeded by: Carole Crist

Personal details
- Born: Columba Garnica Gallo; August 17, 1953 (age 72) León, Guanajuato, Mexico
- Party: Republican
- Spouse: Jeb Bush (m. 1974)
- Children: 3, including George

Columba Bush (née Garnica Gallo; Latin American Spanish: [koˈlumba ɣaɾˈnika ˈɣaʝo]; born August 17, 1953) is a Mexican and American philanthropist. As the wife of former Florida Governor Jeb Bush, she served as the First Lady of Florida from 1999 to 2007.

== Early life ==
Columba Garnica Gallo was born in the community of Arperos, in the city of León, Guanajuato, Mexico, the daughter of José María Garnica Rodríguez (1925–2013), a migrant worker and waiter from Arperos, Guanajuato, and Josefina Gallo Esquivel (May 8, 1920 – August 14, 2016), from León, who were married in February 1949. Columba's father emigrated to the United States in 1956 when she was 3 years old and her parents divorced in 1963. Following the departure of her father, Columba and her mother remained in León.

Garnica attended Instituto Antonia Mayllen, a private Catholic school in the historic center of León.

She met Jeb Bush in 1970 in León when she was 16 years old and he was 17. Bush was teaching English as a second language and assisting in the building of a school in the small nearby village of Ibarrilla as part of a class at Andover called Man and Society.

Garnica and Bush married on February 23, 1974, in Austin, Texas, at the chapel in the Catholic student center on the campus of the University of Texas at Austin. At the time of the wedding, she did not yet speak English fluently and a part of the wedding ceremony was conducted in Spanish.

== Politics ==
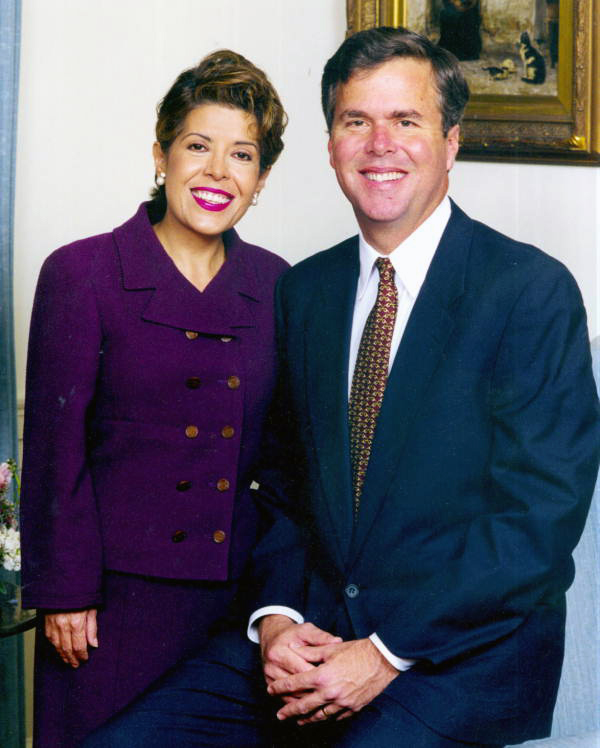
Columba with her husband Jeb Bush in 1999.

In 1988, she appeared in a Spanish-language campaign commercial for her father-in-law, George H. W. Bush, in his campaign for President and she presented a nominating speech for him, also in Spanish, at the Republican National Convention in New Orleans. But, for the most part, she tends to be uninvolved in politics.

As First Lady of Florida, Bush advocated for Florida Coalition Against Domestic Violence, the Center on Addiction and Substance Abuse, and Arts for Life, a group that gives scholarships to young artists.

Columba Bush has been active in promoting the arts. In 1999, she worked with Arts for a Complete Education/Florida Alliance for Arts Education (ACE/FAAE) to create Arts for Life!, a program devoted to increasing the importance of art in the education system.

As First Lady she put together various art exhibitions focusing on Salvador Dalí, Diego Rivera, and Frida Kahlo, and Florida artists.

Bush has been active in programs to warn young people of the dangers of drug abuse. She has worked on treatment and prevention programs such as the National Institute on Alcohol Abuse and Alcoholism (NIAAA). She has served as co-chair of the NIAAA initiative, Leadership to Keep Children Alcohol Free, and has served on the board of the Center on Addiction and Substance Abuse at Columbia University.

As First Lady, she visited shelters, studied reports on addiction in adolescence, put together exhibitions, and connected donors with charities.

In 2003, as First Lady of Florida, Bush was part of a delegation to Rome to celebrate John Paul II's 25th anniversary as Pope, at St. Peter's Basilica.

Bush used her platform to become an advocate on issues like domestic violence, substance abuse, and the arts, and she has been involved with organizations that advocate substance abuse treatment and prevention.

During her husband's 2016 presidential election campaign, Bush visited women's shelters in Iowa and New Hampshire.

== Personal life ==
Columba has been known to be quiet and reserved, and before marrying Jeb Bush, she had wanted to live a quiet life.

Bush and her husband reside in Coral Gables, Florida. Columba Bush's relationship with her mother was the subject of a brief profile in the book Mamá: Latina Daughters Celebrate Their Mothers by María Pérez-Brown. Her sister, Lucila del Carmen Schmitz (born October 1951), and her mother live near her in the Miami area.

The couple has three children: George Prescott Bush (born April 24, 1976, in Texas), Noelle Lucila Bush (born July 26, 1977, in Texas), and John Ellis "Jeb" Bush Jr. (born December 13, 1983, in Miami).

Their eldest son, George, went to Gulliver Preparatory School, studied at Rice University, and earned a Juris Doctor degree from the University of Texas School of Law. He is an attorney, U.S. Navy Reserve officer, real estate investor, and politician, who served as the Commissioner of the Texas General Land Office.

In addition to her three children, Columba Bush has four grandchildren: two by George P. and two by Jeb Jr.

Columba Bush has two older brothers, including Francisco Jose Garnica (born December 1949), who currently lives in Puerto Vallarta, Mexico, and a sister, Lucila del Carmen Garnica Gallo (born in 1951).

A practicing Roman Catholic, she is a member of Regnum Christi. In 2007, with her husband Jeb, she attended the Regnum Christi Family Convention in Atlanta.

Honorary titles
Preceded by Anne MacKay	First Lady of Florida; 1999–2007	Succeeded by Carole Crist
