= Steve Press =

American politician

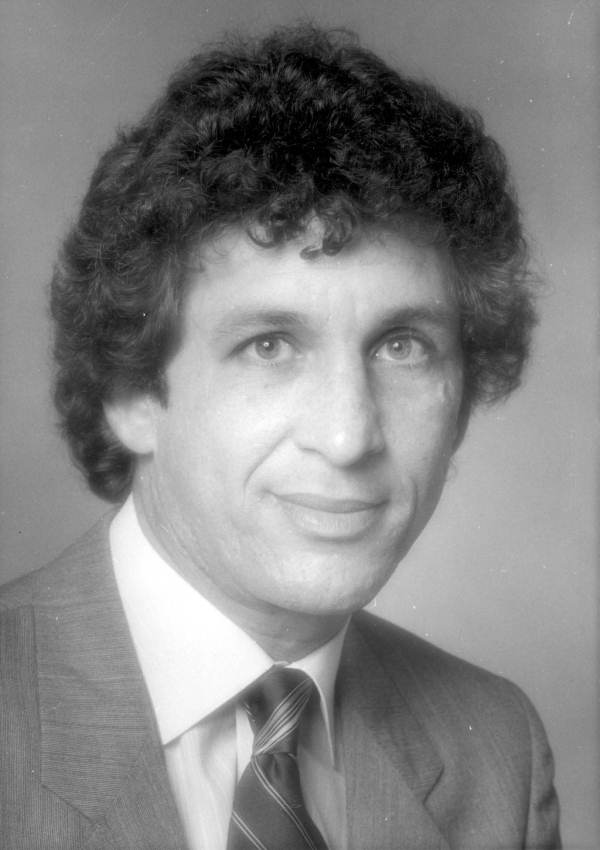

Member of the Florida House of Representatives
- In office 1982–1992

Personal details
- Born: April 15, 1946 (age 80) Washington, D.C.
- Party: Democratic
- Education: University of Florida
- Occupation: Attorney

Steve Press (born April 15, 1946) was an American politician in the state of Florida.

Press was born in Washington and came to Florida in 1962. An attorney, he served in the Florida House of Representatives for the 86th district from 1982 to 1992, as a Democrat.
