= Florida Governor's Mansion =

Historic house in Florida, United States

- U.S. National Register of Historic Places
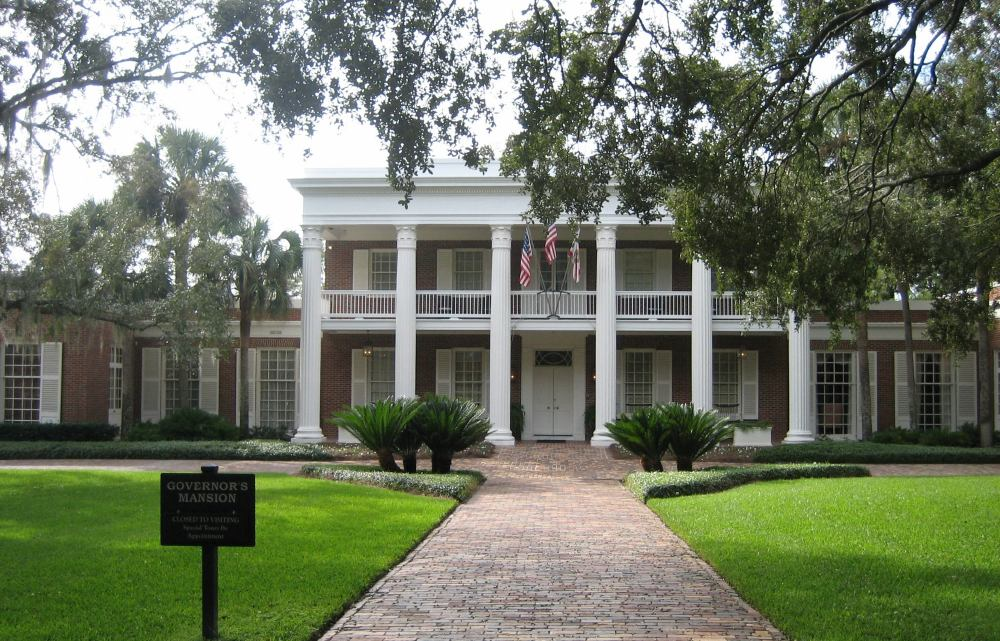

- Location within Florida Location within the United States
- Location: 700 North Adams St, Tallahassee, Florida, United States of America
- Coordinates: 30°26′59″N 84°16′57″W
- Area: 15,000 square feet (1,400 m^{2})
- Built: 1956
- Architect: Marion Sims Wyeth
- Architectural style: Colonial Revival
- NRHP reference No.: 06000618
- Added to NRHP: July 20, 2006

The Florida Governor's Mansion (also called the People's House of Florida) is a historic U.S. residence in Tallahassee, Florida, and the official residence of the governor of Florida. On July 20, 2006, it was added to the U.S. National Register of Historic Places.

== Architecture ==
The mansion, which was designed to resemble Andrew Jackson's Hermitage, was designed by Marion Sims Wyeth. The building has 30 rooms and 15,000 square feet (1,400 m^{2}) of living space on 1.5 acres (6,100 m^{2}) of land.

== Furnishings and antiques ==
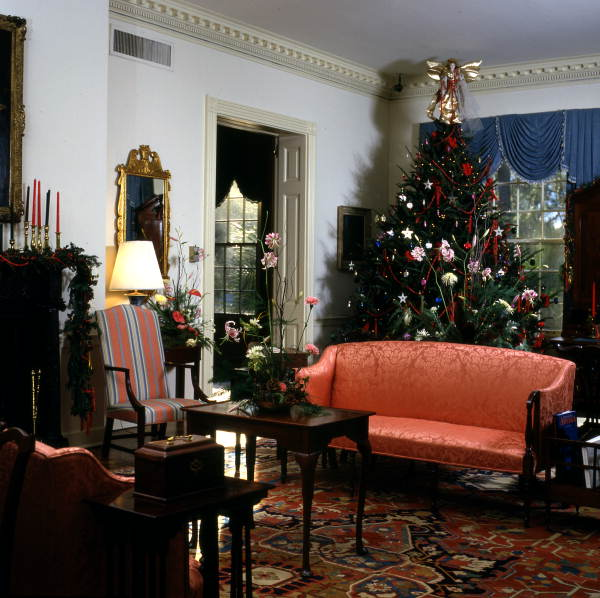
State reception room in the Mansion at Christmas time.

The mansion's furnishings are managed by the eight-member Governor's Mansion Commission, established by the Florida Department of Management Services. The commission is responsible for cataloging and maintaining a descriptive, photographic inventory of the antique furnishings and articles of furniture, fixtures, and decorative objects used or displayed in the state rooms of the Governor's Mansion.

== Public tours ==
Half-hour, public tours of the Florida Governor's Mansion are available year-round. The guided tours, led by trained volunteers of the Governor's Mansion Docent Program, also welcome school groups. The Governor's Mansion curator coordinates all tour requests.

== Entrance park and Florida's Finest sculpture ==
The focal point of the park directly across the street from the mansion is the bronze sculpture, Florida's Finest, which was unveiled in April 1998 by then Governor and Mrs. Lawton Chiles and was dedicated to the children of Florida. The sculpture features five life-size children and a dog playing a game of "Follow the Leader" atop three logs of a nearby fallen tree.

== History ==
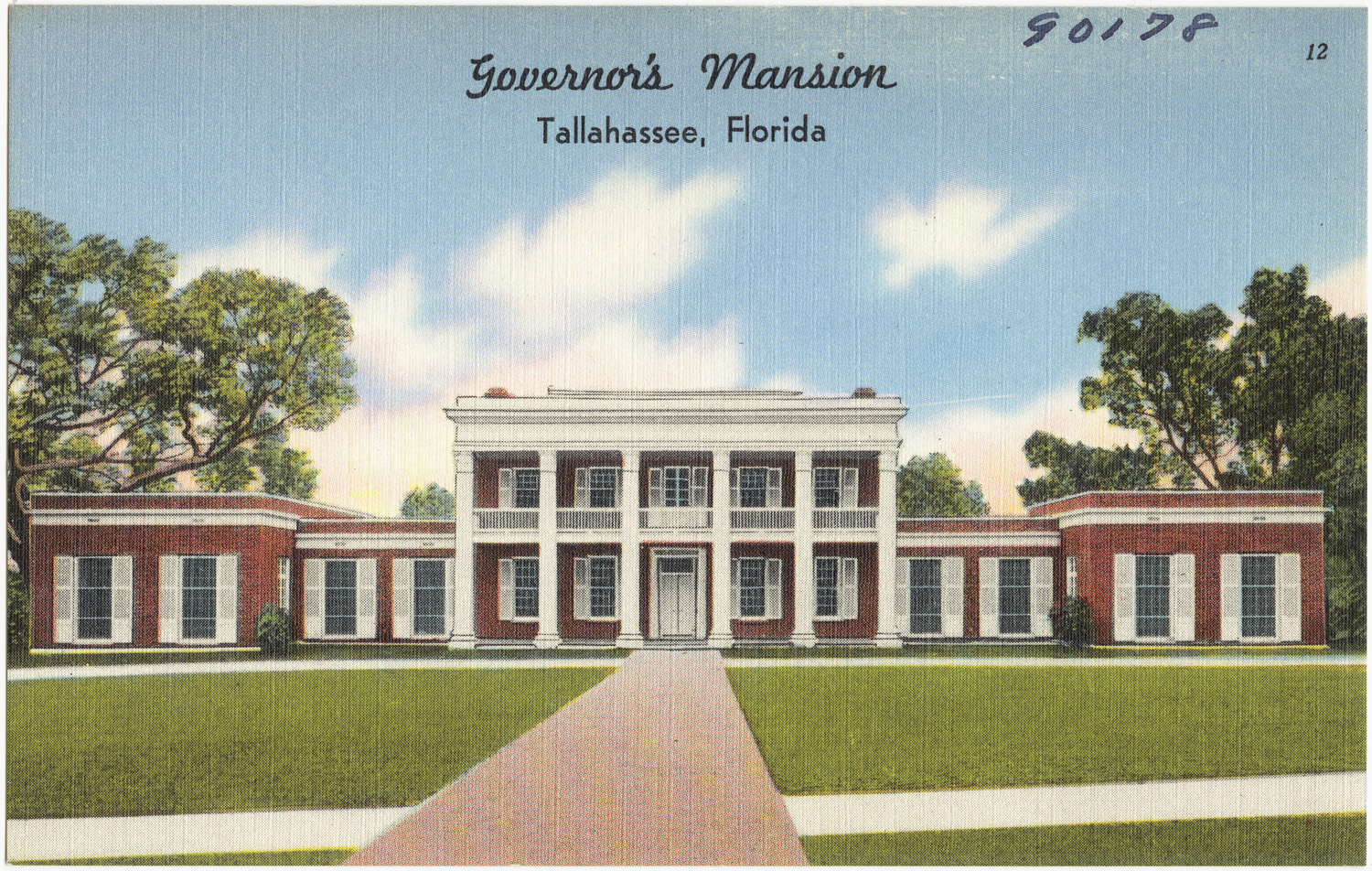
Postcard, ca.1960, showing the mansion

From 1845 (the year Florida was admitted to the Union) to the beginning of the 20th century, governors of the state usually lived in hotels or boardinghouses. In 1905, the state legislature appropriated $25,000 to construct an official residence for the governor, and the home was finished in 1907. George Saxon, a banker from Tallahassee, donated four lots on which to build the residence. Henry John Klutho designed the home, with a Neoclassical exterior and a 14-room Georgian interior.

The 1907 mansion attracted at least one candidate for governor. In the fall of 1915, West Florida Baptists held their annual convention in Tallahassee. Local Baptists agreed to have as guests in their homes the delegates, or messengers as they were called, to the convention. A messenger named Sidney J. Catts, from DeFuniak Springs, was assigned by the convention committee to be the guest of Governor and Mrs. Trammell. Reverend Catts, during dinner the first night there, asked many questions about the mansion and inspected the entire premises, including the attic and stables. At the last meal before leaving, the Reverend Catts asked Governor Trammel, "Governor, how much rent does this place cost you?" Governor Trammel replied, "Reverend, it is provided rent-free by the taxpayers of Florida." A few weeks later, the Reverend Catts announced his candidacy for governor and was elected in 1916. Reverend Catts brought a pig, milk cow, and chickens to the mansion during his tenure as governor.

The house served fifteen governors and their families until 1955, when it was determined that a new mansion would need to be built due to a lack of enough space in the house and various structural issues. Governor Fuller Warren, who served from 1949 to 1953, referred to it as the "State Shack." The sum of $250,000 was appropriated by the Florida State Legislature in 1953 for a new mansion, and the Cabinet approved the plan in 1955. Many items in the first mansion were auctioned in 1955 to aid in furnishing the new mansion, raising $7,500.

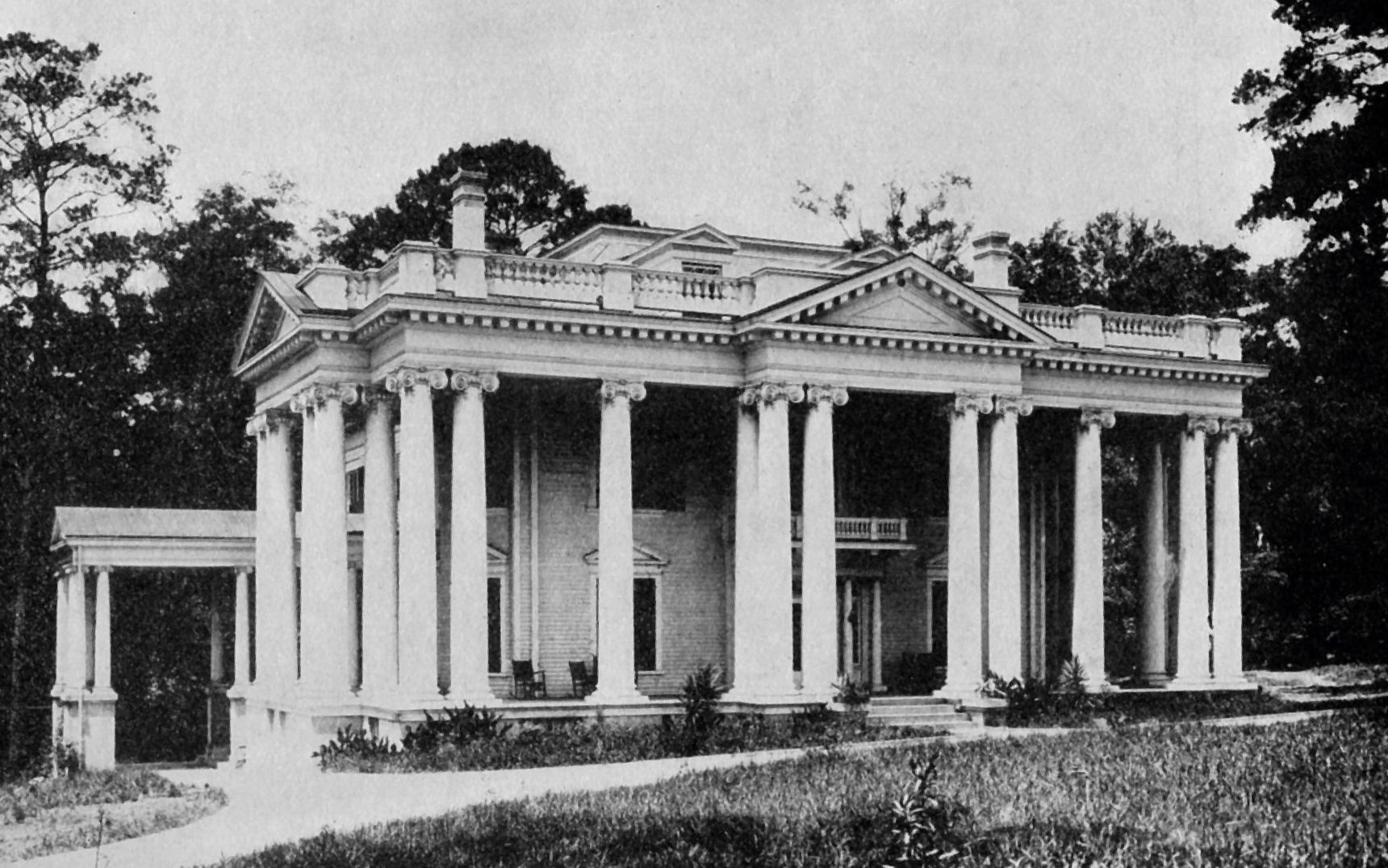
The original Florida Governor's Mansion, circa 1912.

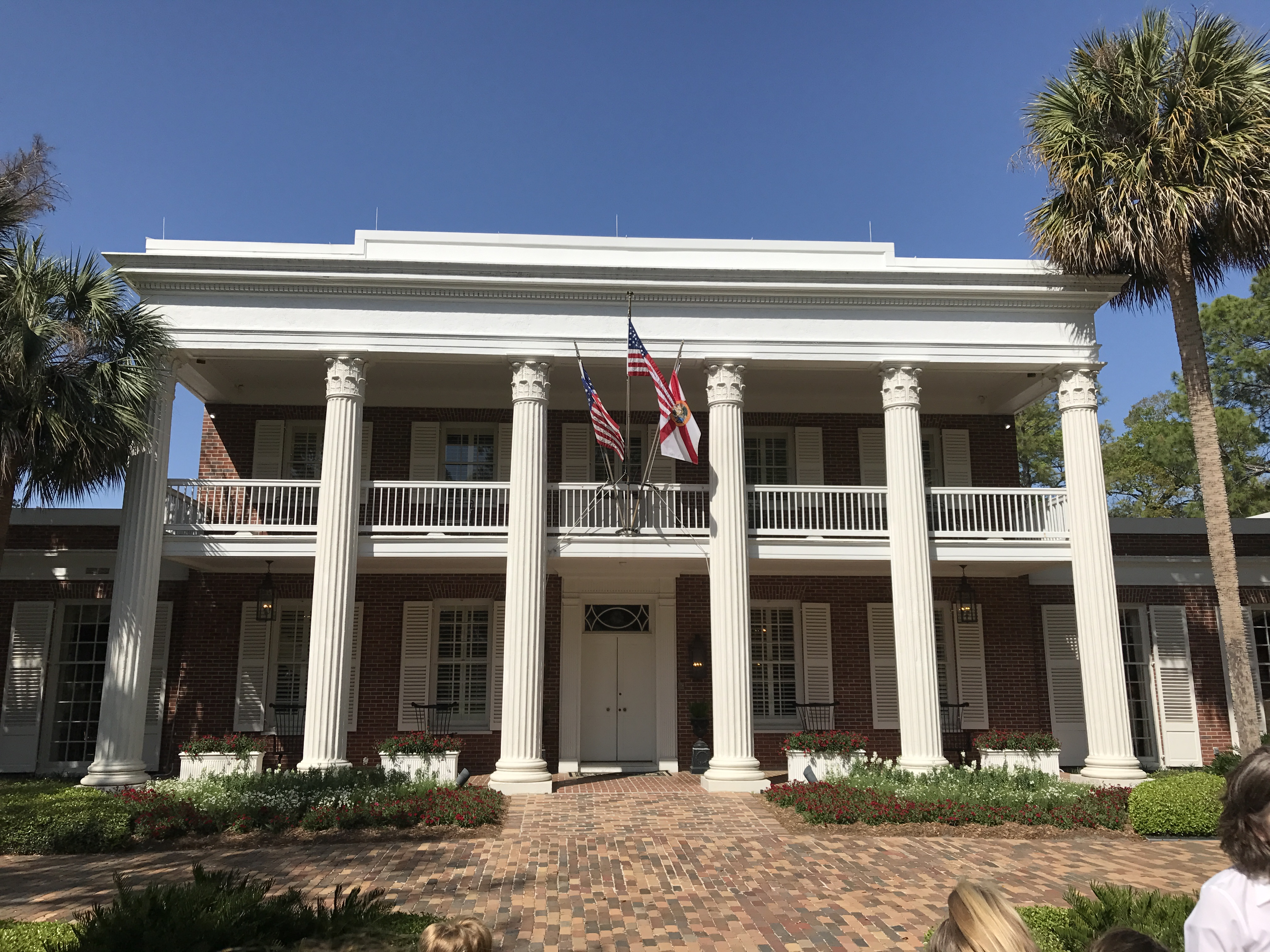
Governor's Mansion in March 2017

Noted Palm Beach architect Marion Sims Wyeth was unanimously chosen by both the Cabinet and the Governor's Mansion Advisory Committee to design the new home. Wyeth was told to use Andrew Jackson's home in Tennessee, The Hermitage, as a model for the exterior. However, due to a shortfall in the state's budget, the completed home had fewer rooms than originally planned. Including furnishings, the new mansion cost $350,000 and was completed a year later, in 1956. The first governor to live in the new mansion was LeRoy Collins, in the spring of 1957. Collins and his wife were actively involved in the new house's construction, and in 1957, they suggested to the state a Governor's Mansion Commission. In 1979, First Lady Adele Graham, the wife of Bob Graham, began organizing tours for the mansion. The next year, she founded the Florida Governor's Mansion Foundation. The contributions of this foundation helped to make possible the first addition to the Governor's Mansion since 1957, the Florida Sun Room. The foundation was created to solicit private funding for the restoration of the mansion, its furnishings, and its grounds.

In 2006, the second addition to the mansion was completed, a new 550-square-foot (51 m^{2}) library for Governor Jeb Bush and his wife, Columba Bush. The Cabinet approved the $500,000 expansion in August 2005. The building celebrated its 50th anniversary in 2005, as well as being added to the National Register of Historic Places. In 2007, Governor Charlie Crist announced the addition of a solar-powered swimming pool and a hydrogen fuel cell at the mansion. The mansion now includes a greenhouse and the Manatee Sculpture Garden, and is next to a private park.

On August 30, 2023, the northern front of the building was struck by a falling oak tree as Hurricane Idalia passed to the east, but no injuries or serious damage was reported.
