= Mixson (name) =

Mixson can be a middle name or a surname. Notable people with the name include:

- Virginia Mixson Geraty
- Margie Mixson (1927–2023), American educator
- Wayne Mixson (1922–2020), American politician and farmer
