= Skip Bafalis =

American politician and businessman (1929–2023)

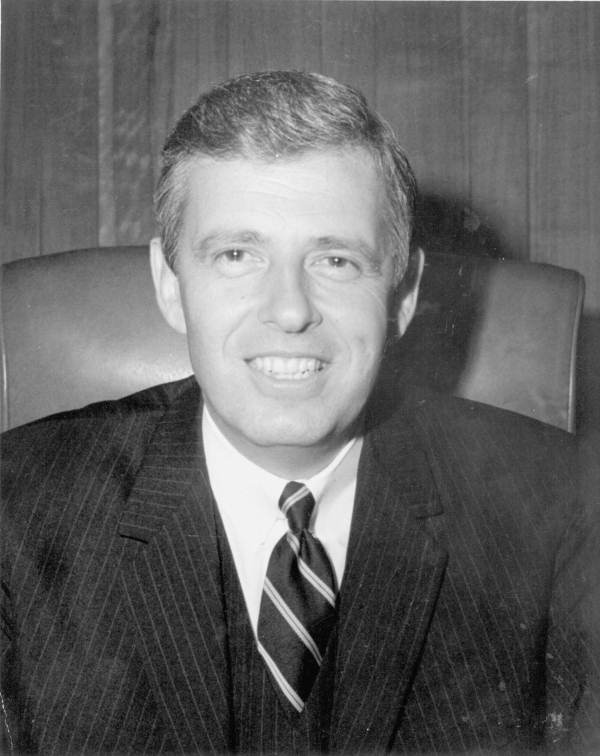
- Bafalis in 1968

Member of the U.S. House of Representatives from Florida's 10th district
- In office January 3, 1973 – January 3, 1983
- Preceded by: J. Herbert Burke
- Succeeded by: Andy Ireland

Member of the Florida Senate from the 33rd district
- In office 1966–1970
- Preceded by: Irlo Bronson Sr.
- Succeeded by: Phil Lewis

State Representative from Palm Beach, Florida
- In office 1964–1966

Personal details
- Born: Louis Arthur Bafalis; September 28, 1929 Boston, Massachusetts, U.S.
- Died: March 10, 2023 (aged 93) Fairfax Station, Virginia, U.S.
- Resting place: Arlington National Cemetery, U.S.
- Party: Republican
- Spouse: Charlotte Maria Bafalis
- Children: 3
- Education: Manchester Central High School; St. Anselm College
- Profession: Businessman

Military service
- Branch/service: United States Army
- Rank: Captain

Louis Arthur "Skip" Bafalis (September 28, 1929 – March 10, 2023) was an American businessman and politician who served as a member of the United States House of Representatives for Florida's 10th congressional district from 1973 to 1983. A member of the Republican Party, he was the party's nominee in the 1982 Florida gubernatorial election, and previously represented district 33 in the Florida Senate from 1966 to 1970.

== Early life ==
Bafalis was born in Boston, Massachusetts, his father was an immigrant from Greece, and his maternal grandparents came from Sweden. He graduated in 1948 from Manchester Central High School in Manchester, New Hampshire, then attended until 1952 Saint Anselm College in neighboring Goffstown, New Hampshire. He was in the United States Army from 1953 to 1956, having reached the rank of captain. After military service, he moved to Florida in 1955 to work as an investment banker.

== Political career ==
=== Florida legislature ===
Bafalis was elected to the Florida House of Representatives in 1964 and then to the Florida Senate in 1966 and 1968. In 1970, he was an unsuccessful candidate for governor of Florida, having lost his party's nomination to Claude R. Kirk Jr., the controversial incumbent. Kirk was subsequently unseated by the Democrat Reubin Askew of Pensacola. In that same election, U.S. House of Representatives member William C. Cramer of St. Petersburg lost the United States Senate race to Democrat Lawton Chiles of Lakeland. The intraparty divisions stemming from the defeats of both Kirk and Cramer set back the projected growth of the Florida Republican Party.

While in the state legislature, he was one of the leaders in the legislative work necessary to bring Walt Disney World to Florida.

=== Congress ===
In 1972, Bafalis was elected to the ninety-third United States Congress (1973–1975) from a newly created district stretching from the Palm Beaches to Fort Myers. He was also elected to the four succeeding congresses and served from January 3, 1975, to January 3, 1983. During his time in Congress, Bafalis resided in Fort Myers Beach and Palm Beach.

As a member of the U.S. House Committee on Transportation and Infrastructure, he played a key role in several road and highway projects in Florida, including Interstate 75, Interstate 95 and new bridges to the Florida Keys and connections from Ft. Myers. Bafalis played a key role in obtaining funding for the expansion of Highway 41 to four lanes from Sarasota to Naples.https://www.news-press.com/story/life/130-years/2014/09/12/people-influence-skip-bafalis/15543355/

While serving in the U.S. House, Bafalis maintained a solidly right-leaning voting record with a lifetime 88% rating from the American Conservative Union and often receiving single digit or zero ratings from the liberal Americans for Democratic Action. Despite his staunchly conservative views, Bafalis frequently worked across party lines with his Democratic colleagues especially within the Florida delegation.

== Later career ==
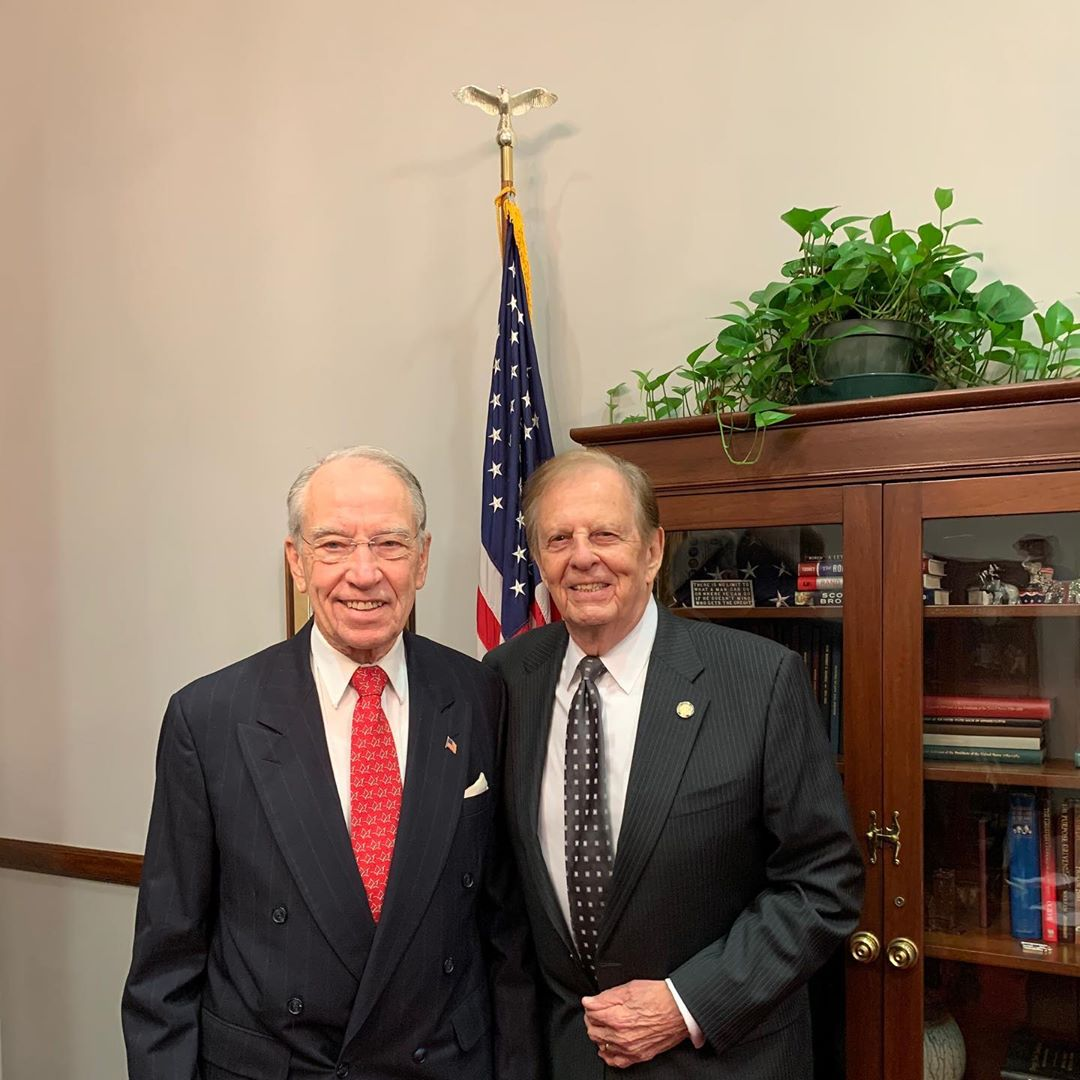
Bafalis with Chuck Grassley in November 2019

Bafalis was not a candidate for re-election to the Ninety-eighth Congress in 1982, but was an unsuccessful gubernatorial nominee, having been defeated by the then incumbent Bob Graham, a Democrat from Miami. According to GovTrack, Bafalis missed 8 percent of the roll call votes during his years of service in Congress, but the percent of missed votes reached 80 percent in the second quarter of 1982 when he was campaigning for governor. After his congressional tenure, he worked as a lobbyist and governmental affairs consultant. He tried to make a comeback in 1988 when he ran in the Republican primary for Florida's 13th congressional district when incumbent Connie Mack III gave it up to run for Senate. Bafalis had represented much of this district, including Fort Myers, during his initial stint in Congress. He lost in the primary runoff, however, to Lee County Commissioner Porter Goss.

== Personal life and death ==
As of 2011, Bafalis resided outside Washington, D.C., in Fairfax, Virginia. He was a partner at the Arlington-based government affairs firm Alcalde & Fay. Bafalis had three children, Renee Louise Bafalis, Gregory Louis Bafalis, and Joshua Evan Bafalis. His wife was Charlotte Maria Bafalis.

Bafalis died in Fairfax Station, Virginia, March 10, 2023, at the age of 93.

Party political offices
Preceded by Jack Eckerd	Republican nominee for Governor of Florida; 1982	Succeeded by Bob Martinez
U.S. House of Representatives
Preceded by J. Herbert Burke	Member of the U.S. House of Representatives from Florida's 10th congressional district 1973–1983	Succeeded by Andy Ireland
U.S. order of precedence (ceremonial)
Preceded by Justin Amash as Former US Representative	Order of precedence of the United States as Former US Representative	Succeeded by Dan Mica as Former US Representative
