= Margie Mixson =

American educator (1927–2023)

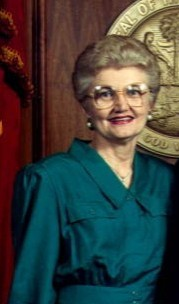

First Lady of Florida
- In role January 3, 1987 – January 6, 1987
- Governor: Wayne Mixson
- Preceded by: Adele Khoury Graham
- Succeeded by: Mary Jane Martinez

Second Lady of Florida
- In role January 2, 1979 – January 3, 1987

Personal details
- Born: Margie Grace; July 12, 1927
- Died: December 27, 2023 (aged 96) Panama City, Florida, U.S.
- Party: Democratic
- Spouse: Wayne Mixson (m. 1947; died 2020)
- Education: Florida State University; University of Florida

Margie Mixson (née Grace; July 12, 1927 – December 27, 2023) was an American educator who served as the Second Lady of Florida from 1979 to 1987, and as the First Lady of Florida for three days alongside her husband Lieutenant Governor and Governor Wayne Mixson.

== Early life ==
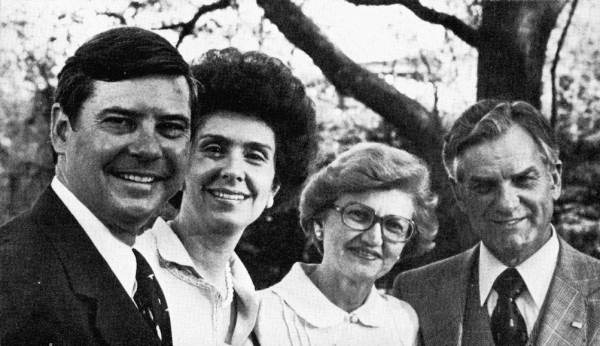
Bob Graham, Adele Khoury Graham, Margie Mixson, and Wayne Mixson in 1986

On July 12, 1927, Margie Grace was born to George Grace and Wilkie Bowen. Her great-grandfather Henry Bartlett Grace served as a Confederate army officer and aided in the foundation of Graceville, Florida. When she was 14 she met Wayne Mixson, who was 19. On December 27, 1947, she married Mixson in Graceville, Florida.

Mixson graduated from Graceville High School, Florida State University with a bachelor's degree, and the University of Florida with a master's degree. During her education at Florida State University she became a member of Kappa Delta Pi.

After graduating from university she started teaching English in Campbellton, Florida and at Graceville High School. She later served as an American Literature professor at Chipola College for thirty years until her husband was elected as the 12th Lieutenant Governor of Florida.

== Second and First Lady ==
=== Second Lady ===
In 1979, Mixson was appointed to serve as one of the thirty-eight members of the Florida Commission on the Status of Women which also had state Representative Elaine Gordon and Representative Carrie Meek. She served as the chairwoman of one of the commission sessions which discussed spousal abuse, the Equal Rights Amendment, sex education, lesbian mother rights, rehabilitation efforts for women, and economic discrimination. She opposed the passage of the Equal Rights Amendment, but support abortion rights.

In 1986, she asked for the Health and Rehabilitative Services Committee in the Florida Senate to approve legislation that would place an additional tax on cigarettes to raise money for cancer research and treatment. During the 1970s she had undergone a double mastectomy for breast cancer treatment.

=== First Lady ===
In 1986, Governor Bob Graham won election to the United States Senate. On January 3, 1987, he resigned from the governorship to take office in the Senate. On January 3, Wayne Mixson was inaugurated as the 39th Governor of Florida by Chief Justice Parker Lee McDonald of the Florida Supreme Court while Margie Mixson held the Bible. She served as the First Lady of Florida during her husband's three day gubernatorial tenure.

== Later life ==
After Mixson's husband left office they returned to their farm in Jackson County, Florida to raise cattle and grow peanuts, cotton, and soybeans.

On July 8, 2020, Wayne Mixson died in Tallahassee, Florida, at the age of 98. She died in Panama City, Florida, on December 27, 2023, at the age of 96.
