= Wayne Mixson =

American politician and farmer (1922–2020)

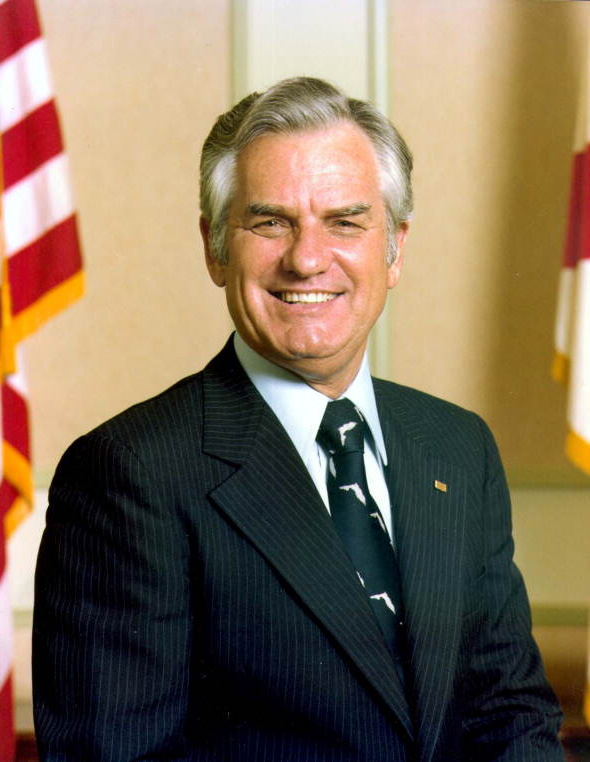

39th Governor of Florida
- In office January 3, 1987 – January 6, 1987
- Lieutenant: Vacant
- Preceded by: Bob Graham
- Succeeded by: Bob Martinez

12th Lieutenant Governor of Florida
- In office January 2, 1979 – January 3, 1987
- Governor: Bob Graham
- Preceded by: Jim Williams
- Succeeded by: Bobby Brantley

Member of the Florida House of Representatives from the 7th district
- In office November 7, 1972 – November 7, 1978
- Preceded by: Jerry Melvin
- Succeeded by: Sam Mitchell

Member of the Florida House of Representatives from the 11th district
- In office March 28, 1967 – November 7, 1972
- Preceded by: Seat established
- Succeeded by: Donald L. Tucker

Personal details
- Born: John Wayne Mixson; June 16, 1922 New Brockton, Alabama, U.S.
- Died: July 8, 2020 (aged 98) Tallahassee, Florida, U.S.
- Party: Democratic (before 2012); Republican (2012–2020)
- Spouse: Margie Grace (m. 1947)
- Education: University of Florida (BBA)

Military service
- Allegiance: United States
- Branch/service: United States Navy
- Battles/wars: World War II

John Wayne Mixson (June 16, 1922 – July 8, 2020) was an American politician, farmer, and Navy veteran who served as the 39th governor of Florida for three days in January 1987, after having served as the 12th lieutenant governor of Florida from 1979 to 1987. Mixson served in the Florida House of Representatives from 1967 to 1978 prior to being elected as lieutenant governor. He was a lifelong conservative Democrat, and though he served in the Florida legislature and as Florida's lieutenant governor as a member of that party, he supported a mix of Democratic and Republican candidates for various state and national offices after retiring from elected office.

Mixson was born and raised in New Brockton, Alabama. He served in the United States Navy during World War II, then attended college at Columbia University and the University of Pennsylvania before moving to Florida and finishing his degree at the University of Florida in 1947. He became an active member of the American Farm Bureau Federation and served in multiple positions in the organization from the county to statewide level both before and after his terms in elected office.

Mixson entered politics in 1966, with an unsuccessful run in the Democratic primary election for a seat in the Florida Senate. In 1967, he won election to the Florida House of Representatives from Jackson County in the Florida panhandle and served a total of six terms as a state legislator. In 1978, Bob Graham, a state senator from South Florida, tapped Mixson to be his running mate to balance the ticket in his campaign for governor. They won, and Mixson was sworn in as Florida's 12th lieutenant governor in January 1979. The ticket of Graham and Mixson were reelected in 1982, but Graham was prohibited from running for a third term in 1986 due to Florida's term limit law. Instead, Graham ran for and won election to the United States Senate.

Mixson did consider running for governor to replace Graham in 1986, but ultimately decided to retire from electoral politics and Republican Bob Martinez won the office. Graham's term in the U.S. Senate began three days before his term as governor ended, so he resigned effective January 3, 1987 to assume his new duties in Washington. As stipulated in state law, lieutenant governor Wayne Mixson briefly assumed the office of governor, and he held the office for about 72 hours before Martinez was inaugurated on January 6, 1987.

== Early life and education ==
John Wayne Mixson was born on June 16, 1922, in New Brockton, Alabama, to Cecil Marion Mixson and Mineola Moseley. Mixson's great-grandfather and great-uncle had both served as members of the Alabama Legislature. In 1941, he graduated from high school and moved to Florida. In 1942, Mixon joined the United States Navy. Mixson attended Columbia University and the University of Pennsylvania before graduating from the University of Florida in 1947, with a degree in business administration. On December 27, 1947, he married Margie Grace in Graceville, Florida.

=== Farm Bureau ===
During the 1950s he served as president of the Jackson County Farm Bureau. Mixson was selected to replace Sandy Johnson as the Florida Farm Bureau's field representative in North Florida and took the position on June 15, 1954. In 1955, he was selected to replace Sandy Johnson as organizational director of the Florida Farm Bureau. From 1958 to 1960, he served as the southern regional director for the national Farm Bureau. In 1960, he became the director of industry relations and commodity activities for the Florida Farm Bureau.

In 1961, Mixson resigned from his position within the Florida Farm Bureau to manage his farm and considered running in the 9th congressional district during the 1962 elections. In 1963, he was selected to serve on the board of directors of the Jackson County Farm Bureau and was reelected in 1964, and 1966.

In 1965, E. H. Finlayson, president of the Florida Farm Bureau, announced that he would not seek reelection, and Mixson ran to succeed him, but later withdrew. Art Karst was selected to replace Finlayson while Mixson was selected to serve as vice president.

During the 1970s Mixson would serve as the only full-time farmer on the Agriculture committee in the Florida House of Representatives or as the only full-time farmer in the state House. In 1977, he had a net worth of $256,200, assets worth $1,051,400, with $564,900 coming from his 1,883 acres of farm land and $150,000 from his cattle, and an income of $298,592, with a majority coming from cattle, peanuts, and grain sales.

== Career ==
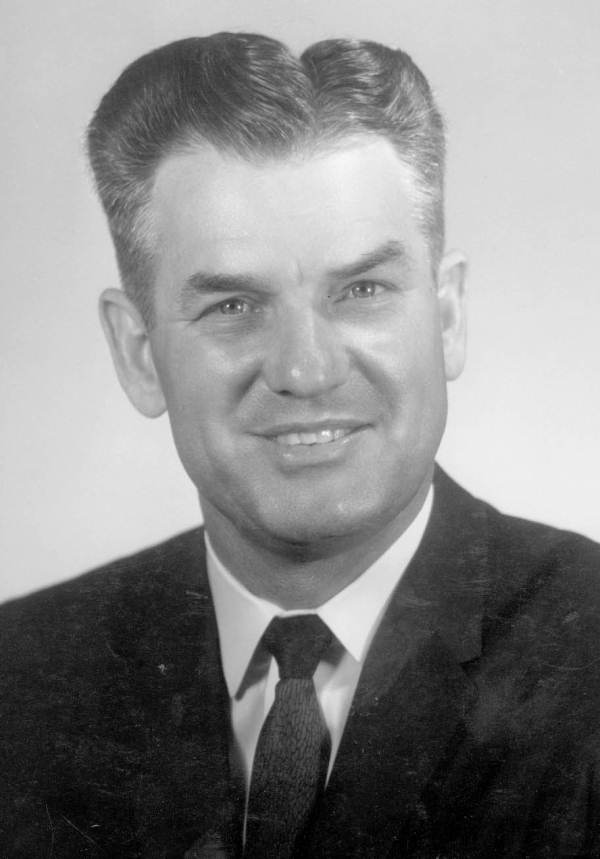
Wayne Mixson's portrait from the Florida House of Representatives in 1968

During the 1950s Mixson supported Republican presidential nominee Dwight D. Eisenhower. During the 1964 presidential election he supported Republican nominees Barry Goldwater and William E. Miller. He also served as a member of the Florida Citizens For Goldwater-Miller committee.

=== State legislature ===
==== Elections ====
Mixson ran for the Democratic nomination for the state Senate from the 6th district in 1966, but placed third behind Bill Pearce and L. P. Gibson. In 1967, he ran for the Democratic nomination for the state House of Representatives from the 11th district. In the primary he defeated incumbent Representative Coy J. Mitchell and later faced no opposition in the general election. In 1968 and 1970, he won reelection.

On June 29, 1972, he announced that he would seek reelection to the House of Representatives. In the Democratic primary he defeated John Grace, a 26 year old veteran of the Vietnam War, and in the general election Mixson faced no opposition. In 1974, he was reelected.

==== Tenure ====
During the 1967–1968 session of the House of Representatives Mixson served on the Ad Valorem Taxation, Appropriations, Claims, Public Health and Welfare, and State Institutions committees. During the 1968–1970 session of the House of Representatives he served as the vice chairman of the Agriculture committee and as a member of the Ad Valorem Taxation, and Transportation committees. During the 1970–1972 session of the House of Representatives he served as the vice chairman of Community Affairs committee and as a member of the Agriculture, Appropriations, and Migrant Affairs committees.

In 1971, Mixson was selected to serve as a Majority Whip alongside John Clark, Elvin Martinez, Roy Hess, Ed Fortune, John Forbes, Lew Whitworth, and Harold Featherstone. Each whip was placed in charge of ten of the eighty-one Democratic members of the House.

During the 1972 Democratic presidential primaries he supported Senator Henry M. Jackson.

In January 1972, Mixson was selected by Speaker Richard Pettigrew to replace Howell Lancaster as chairman of the Agriculture committee due to Lancaster's death. During the 1973–1975 session of the House of Representatives he served as the chairman of Agriculture committee and as a member of the Rules, and Community Affairs committees.

In 1973, an impeachment inquiry was held for Lieutenant Governor Thomas Burton Adams Jr. for using public employees for personal financial gain during his service as Secretary of Commerce. On May 17, the House of Representatives voted 61 to 55 in favor of impeaching Adams, but needed a two-thirds majority of 78 to impeach him. Mixson had voted against impeaching. After failing to impeach Adams the House of Representatives voted 88 to 26 in favor of censuring Adams for using the office for personal gain, which Mixson voting in support of the censure motion.

During the 1975–1977 session of the House of Representatives he served as the chairman of Agriculture, and General legislation committees and as a member of the Appropriations, Community Affairs, and Rules committees. During the 1977–1979 session of the House of Representatives he served as the chairman of Agriculture, and General legislation committees and as a member of the Appropriations, and Rules committees.

On June 2, 1975, the House of Representatives voted 104 to 15, with Mixson voting against, in favor of impeaching state Treasurer Tom O'Malley.

=== Lieutenant governor ===
==== Elections ====
===== 1978 =====
County results of the 1978 Florida gubernatorial election

During the 1978 Florida gubernatorial election Mixson was speculated as a possible lieutenant gubernatorial nominee for both Bob Graham and Robert Shevin. In January 1978, Shevin listed Mixson as one of his five candidates for the position alongside state Senators Lori Wilson, Betty Castor, James Glisson, and state Speaker of the House T. Terrell Sessums.

On March 18, Mixson announced that he would be Graham's running mate, but Graham stated on March 19, that a final decision had not been made yet. On March 30, Graham announced that Mixson would serve as his lieutenant governor as Mixson could appeal to rural voters in northern Florida. Following his selection he was endorsed by the Jackson County Floridian, the daily newspaper in Marianna, Florida, where Mixson lived, and by Guy Long, president of the NAACP in Jackson County, who held a press conference to refute rumors of Mixson being a redneck racist.

Mixson was accused of stating "You all might think you have the nigger vote sewed up in Jackson County, but the truth is, whoever pays 'em last gets it" at Miami's Tiger Bay Club on August 16, by the Miami Herald. Graham and Mixson stated that Mixson did not make that statement.

In the Democratic gubernatorial primary runoff Graham and Mixson defeated Shevin and Glisson with 482,535 votes to 418,636 votes. In the general election Graham and Mixson defeated Jack Eckerd and Paula Hawkins, the Republican gubernatorial and lieutenant gubernatorial nominees. Sam Mitchell was elected to succeed Mixson in the Florida House of Representatives from the 7th district.

===== 1982 =====
In April 1981, Mixson stated that he would seek reelection with Graham in 1982, however, on June 23, he stated that he might not run due to him feeling that he had been cut out of administration decisions as Graham became more reliant on his advisers Garry Smith and Steve Hull. However, after Mixson made the statement Graham held a ninety-minute meeting to discuss Mixson's complaints, and on June 24, Mixson stated that "I think Bob Graham's the greatest governor Florida has ever had, I'm very rewarded to be a part of his team" and that he would still seek reelection.

Mixson was the first lieutenant governor of Florida to win reelection to a second term.

==== Tenure ====
On January 2, 1979, Mixson was inaugurated as the 12th Lieutenant Governor of Florida by Chief Justice Arthur J. England Jr. of the Supreme Court of Florida.

On January 22, Mixson led a 37-member delegation, as Governor Graham was unable, to Guatemala City, Guatemala, for the state's fourth trade mission called the "Intercambio Comercial", with the past three being to Nicaragua, the Dominican Republic, and Venezuela, meant to increase trade between Florida and Central and South America. The trade mission was the first overseas trip sponsored by Graham's gubernatorial administration.

In 1979, President Jimmy Carter appointed Mixson as special ambassador to Ecuador. During the 1980 presidential election Mixson supported President Carter. At the state Democratic convention Mixson was selected to serve as a delegate to the Democratic National Convention in support of Carter alongside Graham, James C. Smith, Doyle Conner, Claude Pepper, Hazel Talley Evans, and Phyllis Miller.

From February 10 to 16, 1980, Mixson was meant to lead a 35-member delegation, which included Agriculture Commissioner Doyle Conner, state House Speaker J. Hyatt Brown, and Commerce Secretary Sidney Levin, during Florida's fifth Intercambio Comercial to Quito and Guayaquil, Ecuador. However, he was unable to lead the delegation as he had been selected to replace Ronnie Book as the head of Graham's legislative lobbying staff and had to lobby for Graham's 1980 tax reform legislation.

In April 1980, Mixson was criticized for his intervening to prevent the suspension of Marianna Circuit Court Clerk Raymond Bruner. The Florida Ethics Commission voted four to one, with Mixson being the only vote against, in favor of recommending the suspension of Bruner for allegations that he had used his position as clerk to sexually harass fourteen employees. Mixson later sent a letter to Graham written by Bruner's lawyers alleging that Bruner was the victim of a political conspiracy. On June 27, Graham signed an executive order to suspend Bruner with the order stating that "these women were subjected to improper sexual advances in actual physical form, including actual physical touching, grabbing, kissing or attempted kissing, pinching, patting, and rubbing, all against their will" and accused Bruner of attempting to cover up the allegations.

On April 29, 1980, Alabama Governor Fob James proclaimed "Wayne Mixson Day" in honor of Mixson giving an address to the Alabama state legislature on the same day.

In 1985, Mixson served as Florida's representative at President Ronald Reagan's second inaugural address.

=== Governor ===
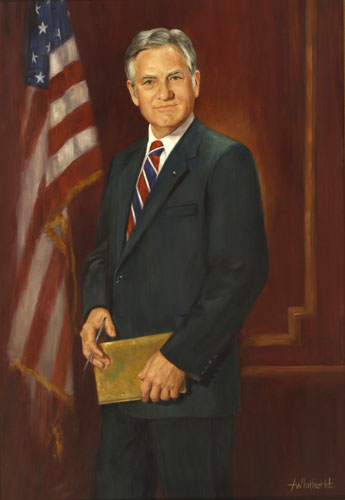
Mixon's official portrait

After serving as Florida's governor for the maximum two consecutive terms, Bob Graham was elected to the United States Senate in November 1986. He soon announced that he planned to resign as Florida's governor to assume his new role on January 3, three days before the end of his term. Mixson would therefore become Florida's governor in the interim. Prior to taking the office Mixson received letters asking either for themselves to be appointed as his lieutenant governor-designate or to appoint a black, Hispanic, or a woman as a symbolic gesture.

On January 3, Mixson was inaugurated as the 39th Governor of Florida by Florida’s Chief Justice Parker Lee McDonald of the Florida Supreme Court. He was the second lieutenant governor to assume the governorship. During his three-day gubernatorial tenure, Mixson held one cabinet meeting and one press conference, appointed a new Secretary of Commerce, made 105 appointments, and signed over 800 letters. Mixon's brief term as governor ended on January 6, when Bob Martinez was inaugurated as the 40th Governor of Florida. Martinez recalled one of the political appointments made by Mixson along with 277 political appointments made by Graham, as the Florida Senate had not yet approved the appointments.

Mixson stated that "my goal was to be the governor who did the least damage to Florida during his term in office."

== Later life ==
After leaving office Mixson was selected to serve to serve as a member of the First Florida Bank of Tallahassee's board of directors and as a member of the Bankers Insurance Group's board of directors. In April 1987, he wrote a letter criticizing a proposed 5% sales tax on insurance premiums and called for mass protests against it. In May, Mixson was elected to the board of trustees in Tallahassee, Florida.

In 1987, Governor Martinez appointed Mixson to serve on the Florida Transportation Commission alongside David Kerr, Kaye Henderson, John Browning, Arthur Hill, Arthur Kennedy, Wayne Reece, and Robert Wilhelm. In 1988, Martinez appointed Mixson to serve as the director of PRIDE, which ran prison industries in Florida.

In 1988, Mixson supported Bill Gunter for the Democratic nomination for the Senate election and supported John Vogt for the Democratic nomination for insurance commissioner. During the 1994 Senate election he supported incumbent Republican Senator Connie Mack III.

In 1996, Mixson was inducted into the Florida Agricultural Hall of Fame. Mixson was given an honorary doctorate from the Florida Institute of Technology.

During the 1994 Florida gubernatorial election Mixson supported incumbent Democratic Governor Lawton Chiles against Republican nominee Jeb Bush. However, during the 1998 Florida gubernatorial election he supported Bush against Lieutenant Governor Buddy MacKay although Mixson still supported Graham for reelection to the Senate against Republican nominee Charlie Crist.

During the 2000 presidential election Mixson supported Texas Governor George W. Bush's presidential campaign. During the 2000 Senate election he supported Republican nominee Bill McCollum against Democratic nominee Bill Nelson. During the 2004 Democratic presidential primaries Mixson supported and donated to Graham's presidential campaign. However, after Graham dropped out of the presidential primary Mixson supported President Bush for reelection in the 2004 presidential election.

Throughout his time in public service, Mixson was viewed widely as a conservative Democrat. In 2012, he changed his voter registration status to identify as a Republican.

In 2014, the Florida State Senate designated Highway 73 out of Marianna Florida to be the Governor Wayne Mixson Highway. Both Governor and Mrs. Mixson were present for the dedication ceremony in September 2014.

In 2015, Mixson wrote the foreword for the first complete book of the Florida Governorship, Robert Buccellato's Florida Governors: Lasting Legacies.

=== Death ===
Mixson died on July 8, 2020, in Tallahassee, Florida, at the age of 98.

== Political positions ==
=== Abortion ===
Mixson was in favor of allowing abortions in the cases of rape, incest, deformity, and if the health of the mother was threatened. In 1970, he voted against legislation that would have left the decision of an abortion to the woman and her doctor.

=== Agriculture ===
In 1967, Mixson and state Senator Elmer O. Friday introduced a resolution calling for the United States Congress and President Lyndon B. Johnson to maintain protective tariffs on agricultural imports. The resolution was later approved by the state House of Representatives.

In 1969, he introduced legislation that would give sheriffs the ability to declare a state of emergency if overt acts of violence or imminent threat of violence occurs within a county and if the governor has not yet declared a state of emergency. The legislation also gave governing bodies the ability to designate another official with the power to declare a state of emergency.

=== Civil rights ===
In 1972, Mixson voted in favor of leaving the phrase "prohibit forced busing" in a voter referendum on desegregation busing.

In 1972, he voted against a referendum on lowering the voting age from 21 years old to 18 years old.

In 1973, he opposed the Equal Rights Amendment stating that the amendment would take more rights away from women than it would give them. The state House of Representatives voted 64 to 54, with Mixson against, against ratifying the Equal Rights Amendment. Mixson cosponsored legislation created by Charles Papy that would prohibit gender discrimination in employment, banking, and education. In 1975, the state House of Representatives voted 61 to 58, with Mixson voting against, in favor of ratifying the Equal Rights Amendment. Despite personally being against the Equal Rights Amendment he lobbied for its passage while serving as Governor Graham's chief lobbyist.

=== Crime ===
In 1967, the state House of Representatives voted 61 to 53, with Mixson against, against legislation that would require a majority of the members of a jury to support the use of capital punishment. Florida law at the time required a majority of the jury to vote to not use capital punishment.

In 1971, he voted in favor of legislation that would institute a $5,000 fine for violations of pollution laws. In 1971, he voted in favor of legislation that would reduce the penalty for possession of marijuana from a felony to a misdemeanor. In 1977, the state House of Representatives voted 72 to 35, with Mixson voting in favor, in favor of legislation that would allow security guards at mental health facilities to use Mace on patients in emergency situations.

In 1979, Mixson supported Graham's decision to sign the death warrant permitting the execution of John Spenkelink, the first execution carried out after capital punishment was reinstated, and stated that he and Graham were "strong supporters" of the death penalty when they were members of the state House.

=== Development ===
During his tenure in the state legislature Mixson and state Senator Lawton Chiles introduced legislation creating sinkhole insurance.

Mixson supported the use of nuclear power and stated that accidents at the Crystal River Nuclear Plant shouldn't deter the development of nuclear facilities.

=== Employment ===
In 1972, Mixson voted in favor of right-to-work legislation. In 1973, Mixson and Lewis Earle co-wrote right-to-work legislation, which would prohibit the denial of work due to membership or non-membership of a union. He stated that unions would preserve the drudgery and rigors of hand harvesting methods.

In 1977, Mixson was one of twelve members of the state House of Representatives that was given a 0% rating by the Florida Education Association-United.

During the 1979 oil crisis Mixson opposed the energy saving policy of banning gasoline sales on weekends proposed by President Jimmy Carter as it would cost Florida's economy $100 million and 29,000 jobs. Mixson later called for an increased taxation on gasoline to as the oil crisis reduced gasoline taxation by $100 million.

=== Gambling ===
In 1967, Mixson voted against legislation that would have legalized the use of Bingo by non-profit organizations.

During the 1978 gubernatorial campaign he stated that legalized casino gambling would reduce tourism to Florida as "families come here to see our beaches, and our natural wonders, but if we create a Las Vegas-type atmosphere, we'll lose them."

=== Government ===
In 1967, Mixson opposed a plan that would have reduced the amount of Florida counties from 67 to 50. He and William Inman introduced legislation that would allow for a new city charter to be given to Chattahoochee, Florida. He also introduced legislation that would raise the jurisdiction of small claims courts in Jackson County from cases involving less than $250 to cases involving less than $750.

In 1977, the state House of Representatives voted 73 to 31, with Mixson voting against, in favor of a motion to kill a resolution urging the United States Congress to abolish the electoral college and replace it with the direct election of the president using the popular vote.

== Electoral history ==
1966 Florida Senate 6th district Democratic primary
Party	Candidate	Votes	%
Democratic	L. P. Gibson (incumbent)	30,372	30.55%
Democratic	Bill Pearce (incumbent)	16,406	16.50%
Democratic	Wayne Mixson	15,482	15.57%
Democratic	John Due	14,036	14.12%
Democratic	Jackson Bryan	8,986	9.04%
Democratic	Tom Davis	8,114	8.16%
Democratic	Ed Bush	3,115	3.13%
Democratic	Odis Murphy	2,902	2.92%
Total votes		99,413	100.00%

1967 Florida House of Representatives 11th district election
Primary election
Party	Candidate	Votes	%
Democratic	Wayne Mixson	5,300	62.40%
Democratic	Coy J. Mitchell (incumbent)	3,194	37.60%
Total votes		8,494	100.00%
General election
Democratic	Wayne Mixson	5,653	100.00%
Total votes		5,653	100.00%

1972 Florida House of Representatives 11th district Democratic primary
Party	Candidate	Votes	%
Democratic	Wayne Mixson (incumbent)	7,185	85.05%
Democratic	John Grace	1,263	14.95%
Total votes		8,448	100.00%

1976 Florida House of Representatives 11th district Democratic primary
Party	Candidate	Votes	%
Democratic	Wayne Mixson (incumbent)	3,648	78.54%
Democratic	Dennis Casey	997	21.46%
Total votes		4,645	100.00%

1978 Florida Governor and Lieutenant Governor Democratic primary
Party	Candidate	Votes	%
Democratic	Robert Shevin / Jim Glisson	364,732	35.15%
Democratic	Bob Graham / Wayne Mixson	261,972	25.25%
Democratic	Hans G. Tanzler / Manuel Arques	124,706	12.02%
Democratic	Jim Williams / Betty Castor	124,427	11.99%
Democratic	Bruce A. Smathers / Charles W. Boyd	85,298	8.22%
Democratic	Claude R. Kirk, Jr. / Mary L. Singleton	62,534	6.03%
Democratic	Leroy Eden / Maria Kay	13,864	1.34%
Total votes		1,037,533	100.00%

1978 Florida Governor and Lieutenant Governor Democratic runoff
Party	Candidate	Votes	%
Democratic	Bob Graham / Wayne Mixson	482,535	53.55%
Democratic	Robert Shevin / Jim Glisson	418,636	46.45%
Total votes		901,171	100.00%

1978 Florida Governor and Lieutenant Governor general election
Party	Candidate	Votes	%
Democratic	Bob Graham / Wayne Mixson	1,406,580	55.58%
Republican	Jack Eckerd / Paula Hawkins	1,123,888	44.42%
Total votes		2,530,468	100.00%

1982 Florida Governor and Lieutenant Governor election
Primary election
Party	Candidate	Votes	%
Democratic	Bob Graham / Wayne Mixson	839,128	84.47%
Democratic	Fred Kuhn / Jeffrey L. Latham	93,083	9.37%
Democratic	Robert P. Kunst / Gary Bryant	61,191	6.16%
Total votes		993,402	100.00%
General election
Democratic	Bob Graham / Wayne Mixson	1,739,553	64.70%
Republican	Skip Bafalis / Leo Callahan	949,013	35.30%
Total votes		2,688,566	100.00%

Florida House of Representatives
New seat	Member of the Florida House of Representatives from the 11th district 1967–1972	Succeeded by Donald L. Tucker
Preceded by Jerry Melvin	Member of the Florida House of Representatives from the 7th district 1972–1978	Succeeded by Sam Mitchell
Party political offices
Preceded by Jim Williams	Democratic nominee for Lieutenant Governor of Florida; 1978, 1982	Succeeded by Franklin B. Mann
Political offices
Preceded by Jim Williams	Lieutenant Governor of Florida; 1979–1987	Succeeded by Bobby Brantley
Preceded by Bob Graham	Governor of Florida; 1987	Succeeded by Bob Martinez
