= Gwen Graham =

American lawyer and politician (born 1963)

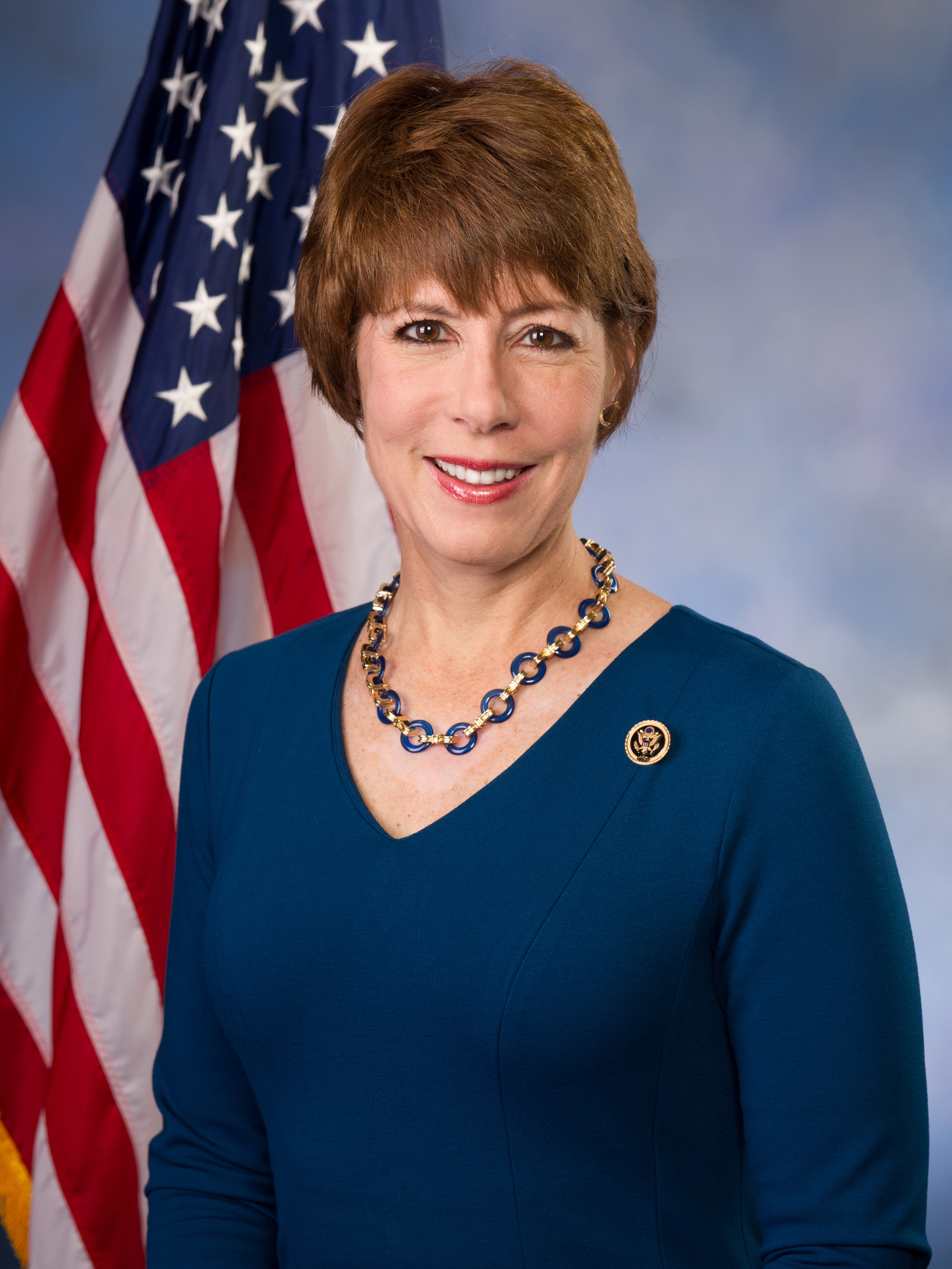
- Official portrait, 2015

Assistant Secretary of Education for Legislation and Congressional Affairs
- In office October 8, 2021 – January 20, 2025
- President: Joe Biden
- Preceded by: Peter Oppenheim (2019)
- Succeeded by: Mary Riley

Member of the U.S. House of Representatives from Florida's 2nd district
- In office January 3, 2015 – January 3, 2017
- Preceded by: Steve Southerland
- Succeeded by: Neal Dunn (redistricted)

Personal details
- Born: Gwendolyn Graham; January 31, 1963 (age 63) Miami Lakes, Florida, U.S.
- Party: Democratic
- Spouses: Mark Logan (m. 1985, divorced); Stephen Hurm
- Children: 3
- Parent(s): Bob Graham; Adele Khoury
- Relatives: Phil Graham (uncle); Katharine Graham (aunt); Donald E. Graham (cousin); Lally Weymouth (cousin); Jimmy Carter (fourth cousin once removed); Jack Carter (fifth cousin); Jason Carter (fifth cousin once removed)
- Education: University of North Carolina, Chapel Hill (BA); American University (JD)

Gwendolyn Graham (born January 31, 1963) is an American attorney and politician who served as the U.S. representative for Florida's 2nd congressional district from 2015 to 2017. She is the daughter of Bob Graham, the former United States senator and governor of Florida. A Democrat, she was a candidate in the 2018 Democratic primary for Florida governor. Graham served as assistant secretary of education for legislation and congressional affairs in the Biden administration from 2021 to 2025. On June 10, 2026, David Jolly announced Graham as his running mate for the 2026 Florida gubernatorial election.

== Early life and education ==
Graham was born in Miami Lakes, Florida, to Adele (née Khoury) and Bob Graham. She moved to Tallahassee in 1978, when her father became Governor of Florida. She has Scots-Irish and, from her maternal grandfather, Syrian-Lebanese ancestry.

Graham is a 1980 graduate of Leon High School in Tallahassee. She received her bachelor of arts from the University of North Carolina at Chapel Hill in 1984 and her juris doctor from American University's Washington College of Law in 1988. She joined Delta Delta Delta while at Chapel Hill.

== Early career ==
After law school, Graham worked as an associate at the Andrews & Kurth law firm in Washington, D.C.

In 2003, Graham joined her father's 2004 presidential campaign. When he dropped out of the race following a heart attack, Graham joined Howard Dean's presidential campaign, before ultimately helping coordinate John Kerry's unsuccessful campaign efforts in Florida.

Graham worked for Leon County Schools as an administrator, including as director of employee relations.

== U.S. House of Representatives ==
=== Election ===
==== 2014 ====
In 2013, Graham announced her candidacy against incumbent Republican Congressman Steve Southerland in 2014. The Democratic Congressional Campaign Committee announced they would target the race and provide support to Graham. Graham was one of just two Democrats in the entire country to defeat an incumbent Republican that year, beating Southerland in the November election by more than 2,800 votes.

=== Tenure and political positions ===
Prior to her swearing in, Graham said both parties need new leadership in Congress and that she would not vote for Nancy Pelosi to be speaker of the House. Graham voted for Rep. Jim Cooper of Tennessee instead. Graham voted for Cooper again when the House voted on the new Speaker after John Boehner announced his resignation.

Graham was ranked as the ninth most bipartisan member of the U.S. House of Representatives during the 114th United States Congress in the Bipartisan Index created by The Lugar Center and the McCourt School. On a scale of zero to one hundred, Graham scores eight as a lifetime rating by the conservative lobbying organization, American Conservative Union. She also scores a 0 on the 2016 Freedom Works ratings, which is associated with the Tea Party movement.

Graham advocated for congressional reforms, including legislation to prohibit members of Congress from using federal funds to pay for first-class airfare and a bill to prevent future government shutdowns.

Graham introduced and passed legislation to help Israel develop an anti-tunneling defense system to detect, map, and destroy tunnels between the Gaza Strip and Israel. Graham joined Florida Democrats Ted Deutch, Lois Frankel, and Alcee Hastings in opposing the Iran nuclear deal.

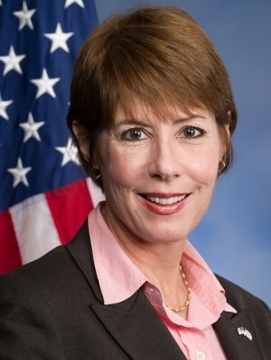
Graham Congressional portrait, 2015

Graham voted repeatedly to defend the Affordable Care Act from repeal and supported fixes to the law. She supports the legalization of medical marijuana and the decriminalization of recreational marijuana in Florida. Graham is pro-choice with a 100% ranking from Planned Parenthood and she supports same-sex marriage and LGBT equality, with a 100% ranking from the Human Rights Campaign.

Graham supports comprehensive immigration reform. She voted to protect the DACA program for young immigrants. She supports bipartisan legislation to grant permanent legal status to refugees of the Haiti earthquake. She voted to place more stringent safeguards on refugee vetting.

Graham supports gun control. In Congress, she joined Congressman John Lewis in the sit-in against gun violence. She co-sponsored legislation to strengthen background checks and prevent those on the terrorist watch list from purchasing guns.

On the environment, Graham co-sponsored bipartisan legislation with Congressman David Jolly and Senator Bill Nelson to oppose oil drilling off the beaches of Florida. She rallied almost the entire Florida congressional delegation to support the Apalachicola Bay Restoration Act. She has voted for the Keystone XL pipeline, based on studies that showed the pipeline would generate less greenhouse gases than transporting the oil by rail, truck, and barge. Graham voted in favor of having the Environmental Protection Agency re-examine its Waters of the United States rule with more input from those it would affect. Graham supported Florida counties in their campaigns against fracking in Florida. She used public records to help expose and investigate Governor Rick Scott's response to a massive sinkhole in Central Florida. Graham supports purchasing land south of Lake Okeechobee to restore the Everglades River of Grass.

=== Reaction to redistricting ===
In 2015, the Florida Supreme Court ruled that the congressional redistricting plan was a partisan gerrymander in violation of the Fair Districts Amendment. The ensuing court-ordered redistricting shifted most of Tallahassee, which had anchored the 2nd district and its predecessors for almost half a century, to the 5th district. Most of Graham's black constituents were drawn into the 5th as well. To make up for the loss in population, the 2nd was pushed to the south to take in territory from the heavily Republican 3rd and 11th districts. Graham now found herself in what was, on paper, one of the most Republican districts in the nation. Had it existed in 2012, Mitt Romney would have won it with 64 percent of the vote, which would have been his third-best total in the state. By comparison, Romney carried the old 2nd in 2012 with 52 percent of the vote.

Had Graham sought a second term in the redrawn 2nd, she would have been running in a district that was far more Republican than its predecessor, even though she would have retained 68 percent of her former territory. Her only other option for representing at least some of her current constituents would have been to run in the Democratic primary for the heavily Democratic, black-majority 5th District against that district's 24-year incumbent, Corrine Brown. Her home in Tallahassee was just outside the boundaries of the 5th district, but members of Congress only have to live in the state they wish to represent. Had Graham run in the 5th, however, she would have been running in a district that would have been more than 67 percent new to her.

In a YouTube video emailed to her fundraising list, Graham announced that she would not run for reelection to the House in 2016, denouncing a process that resulted in Tallahassee being split into "two partisan districts". She said that she was considering running for Governor of Florida in the 2018 election.

=== Committee assignments ===
- Committee on Agriculture
  - Subcommittee on General Farm Commodities and Risk Management
  - Subcommittee on Biotechnology, Horticulture, and Research
- Committee on Armed Services
  - Subcommittee on Tactical Air and Land Forces
  - Subcommittee on Oversight and Investigations
  - Subcommittee on Seapower and Projection Forces

== 2018 gubernatorial election ==
On May 2, 2017, Graham announced her intention to seek the Democratic Party nomination in the 2018 election to serve as governor of Florida.

Graham's message focused on improving Florida's public schools, protecting the environment, and supporting economic policies counter to those of Governor Rick Scott, such as raising the minimum wage to $15 an hour and implementing required paid sick leave. She pledged to expand Medicaid in Florida if elected Governor. She criticized Trump after he equated counter-protesters with white nationalists at the white supremacist rally in Charlottesville, Virginia.

In her campaigns for Congress and Florida's governorship, she is continuing the Workdays tradition established by her father, where the Grahams spend a shift working alongside Floridians at their jobs. Senator Graham performed 408 Workdays throughout his terms as senator and governor. To date, Congresswoman Graham has performed more than 50.

Graham ultimately lost the nomination to candidate Andrew Gillum, the mayor of Tallahassee. Following her election defeat, she endorsed Gillum for governor.

== Biden administration ==
On April 16, 2021, it was announced that Graham would be nominated to serve as assistant secretary of the United States Department of Education for legislation and congressional affairs. On April 22, 2021, her nomination was sent to the Senate. Her nomination was confirmed in the U.S. Senate on October 6, 2021, by voice vote.

== 2026 lieutenant gubernatorial campaign ==
Graham speaking at her final campaign rally of the 2026 election in Broward County, Florida.

On June 10, 2026, David Jolly announced Graham as his running mate for the 2026 Florida gubernatorial election. The ticket was defeated by Republican nominees Byron Donalds and Bryan Avila.

== Personal life ==
Graham lives in Tallahassee. She married Mark Logan in 1985, and they have three children together. While raising her children, Graham worked for 13 years as a self-described "stay-at-home mom." Graham and Logan divorced, and she is now married to Stephen Hurm.

== Electoral history ==
Florida's 2nd Congressional District election, 2014
Party	Candidate	Votes	%
Democratic	Gwen Graham	126,096	50.5%
Republican	Steve Southerland (Incumbent)	123,262	49.3%
Write-in	Luther Lee	422	0.2%
Total votes		249,780	
Democratic gain from Republican			

Florida Democratic gubernatorial primary, 2018
Party	Candidate	Votes	%
Democratic	Andrew Gillum	517,417	34.3%
Democratic	Gwen Graham	472,735	31.3%
Democratic	Philip Levine	306,450	20.3%
Democratic	Jeff Greene	151,935	10.1%
Democratic	Chris King	37,464	2.5%
Democratic	John Wetherbee	14,355	1.0%
Democratic	Alex "Lundy" Lundmark	8,628	0.6%
Total votes		1,508,984	

== See also ==
- List of Arab and Middle-Eastern Americans in the United States Congress
- Women in the United States House of Representatives

U.S. House of Representatives
Preceded by Steve Southerland	Member of the U.S. House of Representatives from Florida's 2nd congressional district 2015–2017	Succeeded by Neal Dunn
Government offices
Vacant Title last held by Peter Oppenheim; 2019	Assistant Secretary of Education for Legislation and Congressional Affairs; 2021–2025	Succeeded by Mary Riley
Party political offices
Preceded by Karla Hernández-Mats	Democratic nominee for Lieutenant Governor of Florida; 2026	Most recent
U.S. order of precedence (ceremonial)
Preceded by Curt Clawson as Former U.S. Representative	Order of precedence of the United States as Former U.S. Representative	Succeeded by Debbie Mucarsel-Powell as Former U.S. Representative
