= Charles R. Wilson (judge) =

American judge (born 1954)

Charles Wilson
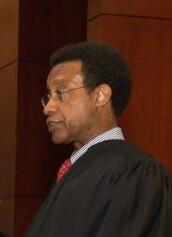
- Wilson in 2022

Senior Judge of the United States Court of Appeals for the Eleventh Circuit
- Incumbent
- Assumed office December 31, 2024

Judge of the United States Court of Appeals for the Eleventh Circuit
- In office August 9, 1999 – December 31, 2024
- Appointed by: Bill Clinton
- Preceded by: Joseph W. Hatchett
- Succeeded by: Embry Kidd

United States Attorney for the Middle District of Florida
- In office 1994–1999
- President: Bill Clinton
- Preceded by: Donna Bucella
- Succeeded by: Donna Bucella

Personal details
- Born: October 14, 1954 (age 71) Pensacola, Florida, U.S.
- Education: University of Notre Dame (BA, JD)

Charles R. Wilson (born October 14, 1954) is an American lawyer who serves as a senior United States circuit judge of the United States Court of Appeals for the Eleventh Circuit.

== Education ==
Wilson was born in Pensacola, Florida, in 1954. He is a graduate of Jesuit High School of Tampa. He received his Bachelor of Arts degree from the University of Notre Dame in 1976 and his Juris Doctor from Notre Dame Law School in 1979.

== Career ==
Following graduation from law school, Wilson served as a law clerk for Judge Joseph W. Hatchett of the United States Court of Appeals for the Fifth Circuit from 1979 to 1980. From 1980 to 1981, he served as an assistant county attorney in Hillsborough County. Following a five-year stint in private practice based in Tampa, he was appointed as a county state judge in Hillsborough County in 1986, serving in that capacity until 1990. From 1994 to 1999, he served as the United States attorney for the Middle District of Florida.

=== Federal judicial service ===
In 1990, Wilson was appointed as a United States magistrate judge of the United States District Court for the Middle District of Florida, serving until 1994.

President Bill Clinton nominated Wilson to the United States Court of Appeals for the Eleventh Circuit on May 27, 1999, to replace the vacancy created when Joseph W. Hatchett retired. Wilson's nomination was uncontroversial, earning bipartisan support from both of his state's senators, Bob Graham and Connie Mack III. Wilson was confirmed by the Senate by voice vote on July 30, 1999. He received his judicial commission on August 9, 1999. He was seated as a circuit judge on September 13, 1999. Wilson assumed senior status on December 31, 2024.

== See also ==
- List of African American federal judges
- List of African American jurists

== Sources ==
- Charles Wilson at Ballotpedia
- 11th Circuit Court of Appeals Profile

Legal offices
Preceded by Joseph W. Hatchett	Judge of the United States Court of Appeals for the Eleventh Circuit; 1999–2024	Succeeded by Embry Kidd
