= 1976 Florida Supreme Court election, Group 3 =

- September 7, 1976
- Turnout: 29% (unofficial) (Note: This statistic is unofficial and calculated by the Tampa Bay Times, not the state canvassing board. It was calculated given the following figures: Votes cast: 1,115,000 Registered Democratic and Republican voters: 3,860,000)
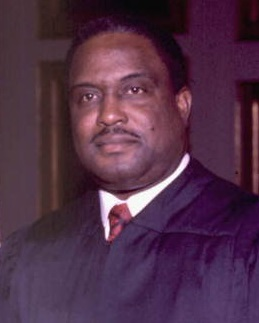

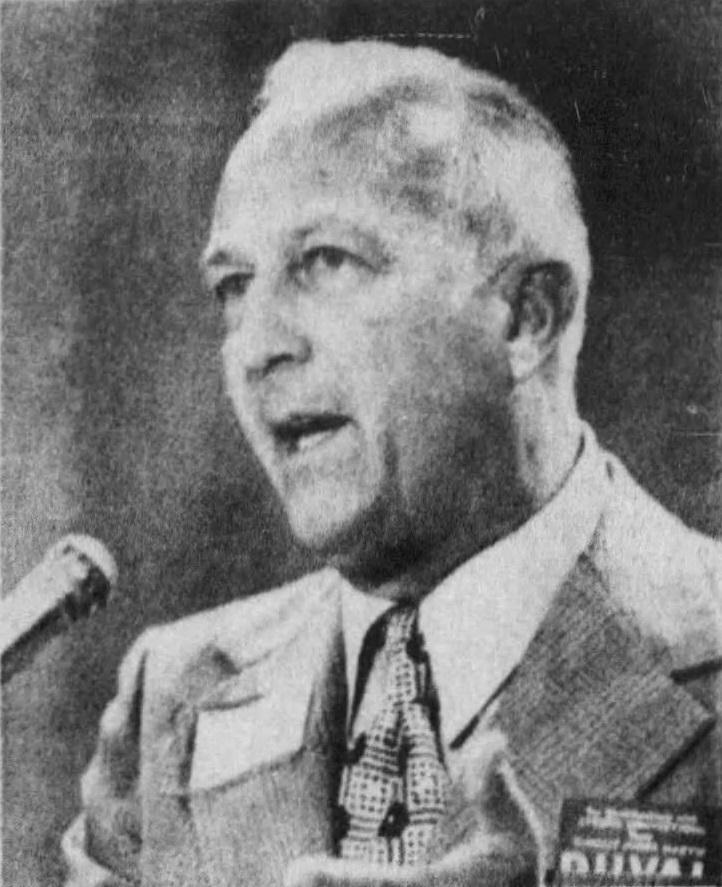
Candidate	Joseph W. Hatchett	Harvie S. DuVal
Popular vote	514,164	323,154
Percentage	61.4%	38.6%
- Unofficial county results (Note: These results are incomplete. At the time of their tabulation by the Tampa Bay Times on 9 September, 3,376 of 3,445 precincts had reported. Due to this, some county results may be inaccurate.); Hatchett: 50–60% 60–70% 70–80% DuVal: 50–60% No vote/results unknown: 50–60%
Justice before election
Joseph W. Hatchett
Elected Justice
Joseph W. Hatchett

The 1976 Florida Supreme Court election for Group 3 took place on September 7, 1976. Incumbent Supreme Court Justice Joseph W. Hatchett, appointed to the Court by Governor Reubin Askew in 1975, was elected to a full term on the bench. Hatchett defeated Harvie S. DuVal, a circuit court judge from Miami, by a landslide margin. This was the last contested election for the Florida Supreme Court before constitutional reforms moved state appeals judges to an uncontested merit election system.

This election marks the first time an African-American candidate won a statewide election in Florida since Reconstruction. Only 29% of registered voters in Florida turned out to vote in this election.

== Background ==
Justice David McCain, mired in scandal, resigned from the Florida Supreme Court under threat of impeachment by the Florida House of Representatives on August 31, 1975. Reubin Askew, then Governor of Florida, appointed Joseph W. Hatchett to the seat. As the first African-American supreme court justice in the state's history, Hatchett's appointment made waves.

== Election ==
=== Candidates ===
- Joseph W. Hatchett, incumbent justice
- Harvie S. DuVal, circuit court judge from Dade County

=== Campaign ===
DuVal announced his intention to run against Hatchett on January 14, 1976. In his announcement, he claimed that "Qualifications is the only issue," and affirmed that his campaign would not have racial overtones. DuVal attacked Hatchett on his record, claiming that he "had done no job at all" and that "he is absent more than he is there." He further alleged that Hatchett went on too many speaking tours, neglecting the business of his office. Hatchett defended himself from these criticisms, stating that his speaking tours "have in no way interfered with the full performance of my duties." He also stated that he spoke publicly to restore public confidence in the courts after the corruption scandals of the 1970s.

Hatchett formally announced his candidacy on May 13, stating that he would limit every campaign contribution to 100 dollars. Reubin Askew, who appointed Hatchett to the Court, campaigned openly for Hatchett and helped him raise money. DuVal sharply criticized Askew for this, calling it "unfair, unethical, and undemocratic." He went on to accuse Askew of "using the full influence and pressure of his powerful office to raise campaign funds for his appointee."

In July, DuVal changed his tone, accusing Askew of practicing reverse racism for appointing Hatchett over six other qualified white candidates. DuVal also repeated a false story claiming that when Askew was given a list of possible appointees to McCain's vacant seat, he sent it back, saying "Send me a black or a woman," with Hatchett being on the next list. Further controversy ensued when it was revealed that DuVal was criticized by the Florida Supreme Court in 1972 for calling the defendant in a rape case an obscene name and made a remark that could be interpreted as anti-Semitic. In early August, the race was described as "having racial overtones."

The two candidates debated at Panama City, Florida, on September 1, where they had a very memorable exchange. DuVal spoke first, talking about his family's roots in Florida and how many things, including Duval County, Florida were named after his family. Hatchett simply replied, "My family has been in Florida for 150 years and nothing is named for them." Hatchett was seen by many as the winner of the debate.

=== Results ===
1976 Florida Supreme Court election, Group 3
Party	Candidate	Votes	%
Nonpartisan	Joseph W. Hatchett	514,164	61.4%
Nonpartisan	Harvie S. DuVal	323,154	38.6%
Total votes		837,318	100.00%
