= Bob Graham Center for Public Service =

Public policy school of the University of Florida

Coordinates: 29.649430°N 82.345365°W

- Type: Public Administration Center
- Established: 2006
- Parent institution: University of Florida
- Endowment: ▲$1.73 billion (2018)
- Director: Dr. Matthew Jacobs
- Location: Gainesville, Florida, U.S.
- Website: www.bobgrahamcenter.ufl.edu

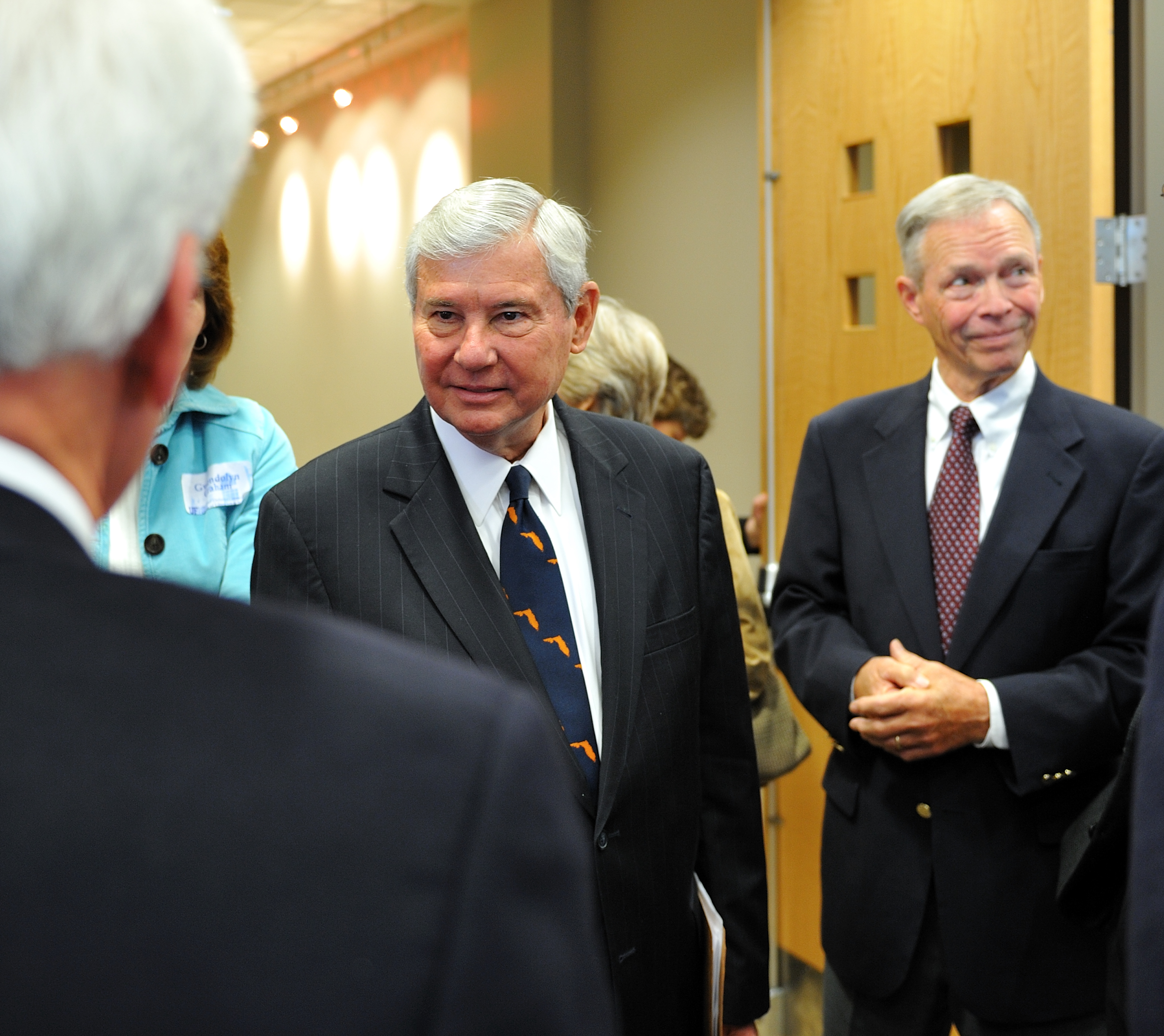
Bob Graham (center), with Buddy MacKay (right) at the dedication ceremony of Pugh Hall, home of the Graham Center

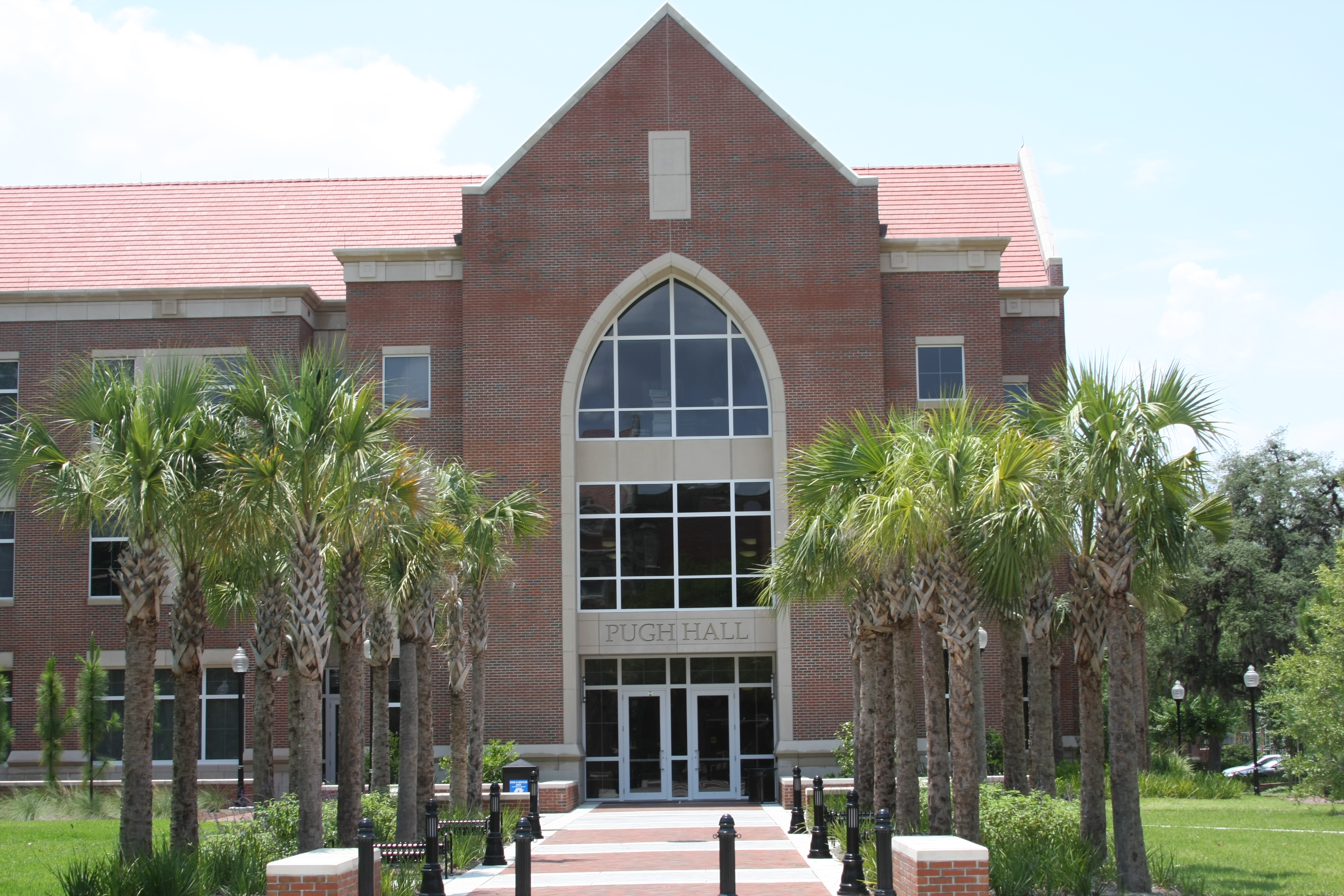
Pugh Hall

The Bob Graham Center for Public Service, housed at the University of Florida in Gainesville, is a community of students, scholars and citizens. The center was founded by the former Florida Governor and U.S. Senator Bob Graham.

The center, located in Pugh Hall on the University of Florida campus, held its grand opening in March 2008.

== Public Programs ==
The Center regularly hosts public events. These events are open to the public and most feature audience question-and-answer sessions.

The Bob Graham Center Civic Library

The Florida Joint Center for Citizenship

The Florida Joint Center for Citizenship is a partnership between the Lou Frey Institute of Politics and Government at the University of Central Florida and the Bob Graham Center. Established in 2007 by formal agreement between the University of Florida and the University of Central Florida.

== See also ==
- Bob Graham
- College of Liberal Arts and Sciences
- University of Florida
- Civil Debate Wall
