= 1982 Florida gubernatorial election =

- November 2, 1982
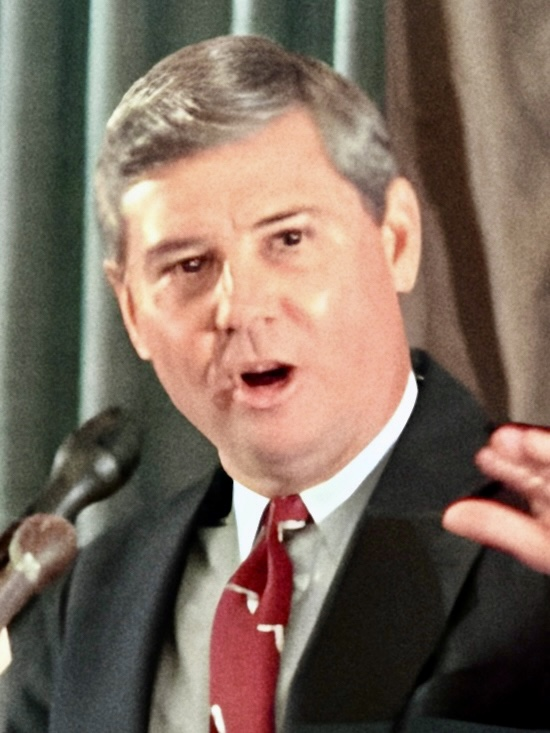

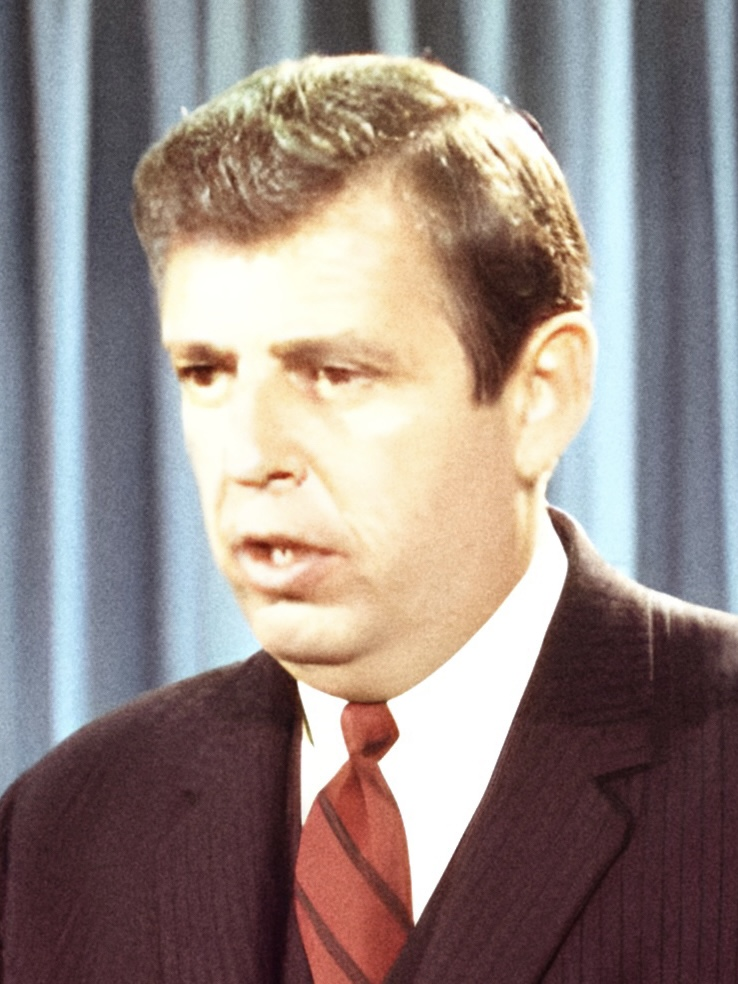
Nominee	Bob Graham	Skip Bafalis
Party	Democratic	Republican
Running mate	Wayne Mixson	Leo Callahan
Popular vote	1,739,553	949,013
Percentage	64.70%	35.30%
- County results Graham: 50–60% 60–70% 70–80% 80–90% Bafalis: 50–60%
Governor before election
Bob Graham
Democratic
Elected Governor
Bob Graham
Democratic

The 1982 Florida gubernatorial election was held on November 2, 1982. Incumbent Democratic Governor Bob Graham was re-elected in a landslide, defeating Republican Congressman Skip Bafalis with 64.70% of the vote. Bafalis was the last Florida Republican gubernatorial nominee never to have won at least one gubernatorial election in his career.

Graham carried 63 of Florida’s counties, with Bafalis only carrying Charlotte, Collier, Lee, and Sarasota counties. As of 2026, this is the last time that the following counties have voted for a Democrat in a gubernatorial election: Escambia, Santa Rosa, Okaloosa, Bay, Suwannee, Nassau, Clay, St. Johns, Marion, Lake, Brevard, Indian River, and Martin. This is also the last occasion in which either nominee received over 60% of the vote (Note: Ron Desantis’s performance in the 2022 gubernatorial election, which he won in a landslide, is to date the closest time either candidate won 60%), and the last time a Republican failed to win at least 60% in a single county.

== Primary elections ==
Primary elections were held on September 7, 1982.

=== Democratic primary ===
==== Candidates ====
- Bob Graham, incumbent governor
  - Running mate: Wayne Mixson, incumbent lieutenant governor
- Fred Kuhn
- Bob Kunst, gay rights activist and perennial candidate

==== Results ====
Democratic Primary by county Graham: 50–60%; 70–80%; 80–90%; >90%

Democratic primary results
Party	Candidate	Votes	%
Democratic	Bob Graham (incumbent)	839,128	84.47%
Democratic	Fred Kuhn	93,083	9.37%
Democratic	Bob Kunst	61,191	6.16%
Total votes		993,402	100.00%

=== Republican primary ===
==== Candidates ====
- Skip Bafalis, U.S. representative from North Palm Beach
  - Running mate: Leo Callahan, Fort Lauderdale chief of police
- Vernon Davids, attorney

==== Withdrew ====
- Tom Gallagher, state representative from Coconut Grove, Miami

==== Results ====
Republican Primary by county Bafalis: 50–60%; 70–80%; 80–90%; >90%

Republican primary results
Party	Candidate	Votes	%
Republican	Skip Bafalis	325,118	86.36%
Republican	Vernon Davids	51,343	13.64%
Total votes		376,461	100.00%

== General election ==
=== Candidates ===
- Bob Graham, Democratic
- Skip Bafalis, Republican

=== Results ===
1982 Florida gubernatorial election
Party	Candidate	Votes	%
Democratic	Bob Graham (incumbent)	1,739,553	64.70%
Republican	Skip Bafalis	949,013	35.30%
Total votes		2,688,566	100.00%
Democratic hold			

== Bibliography ==
- Morris, Allen (1985). The Florida Handbook, 1985-86. Tallahassee, FL: The Peninsular Publishing Company.
