= Adele Khoury Graham =

American educator

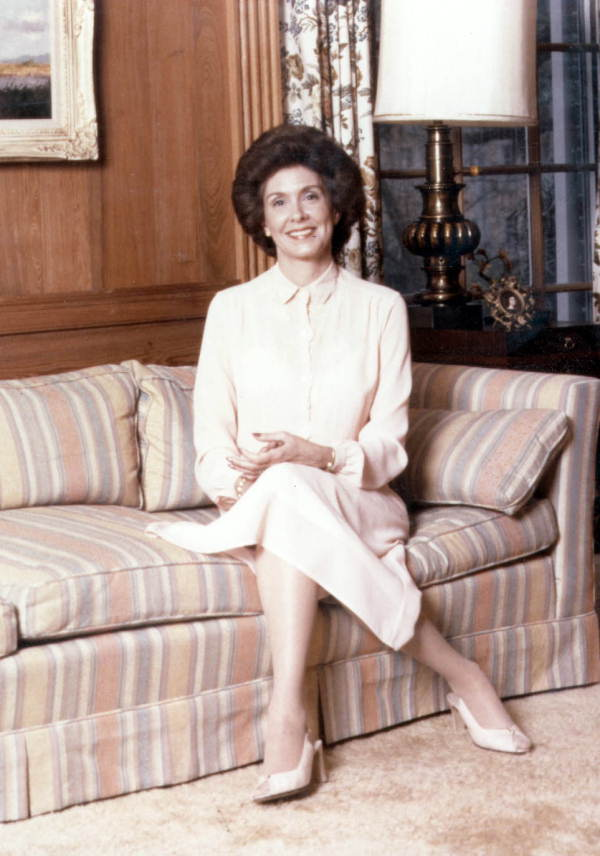

First Lady of Florida
- In role January 2, 1979 – January 3, 1987
- Governor: Bob Graham
- Preceded by: Donna Lou Askew
- Succeeded by: Margie Mixson

Personal details
- Born: Adele Khoury; April 4, 1938 (age 88) Miami, Florida, U.S.
- Spouse: Bob Graham (m. 1959; died 2024)
- Children: 4, including Gwen Graham
- Education: University of Florida (A.A.); Boston University (B.S.)

Adele Khoury Graham (born April 4, 1938) is an American educator and the former First Lady of Florida from 1979 to 1987. She was the widow of the 38th Governor of Florida and former United States Senator Bob Graham.

Adele Graham was the First Lady of the state of Florida from 1979 to 1987. She spent her career as public school teacher in Massachusetts and Miami, Florida. In all, the Grahams have four children and 11 grandchildren.

== Life and career ==
Adele Khoury Graham was born and raised in Miami, Florida. Her parents, Mildred (Moore) and Gabriel Robert Khoury, both moved to Florida in the 1920s. Her mother came from Ohio. Her father was born in Beirut, Lebanon, and spent his younger years, after immigrating, in the state of Georgia.

While at the University of Florida, she became engaged to Bob Graham. They married during her junior year and Bob's senior year. Then they moved to Boston, where he attended Harvard Law School and Adele graduated from Boston University. She taught English and history in the public schools in Wellesley, Massachusetts until Bob graduated from law school. In 1962, during her second year of teaching, she was selected as Massachusetts Teacher of the Year.

Returning to Miami, Adele became involved in civic affairs. She served as a board member with Beaux Arts at the Lowe Art Museum, the Board of Public Television, and Channel 2. She also organized a county-wide school volunteer resource guide for the Junior League, among other activities.

The first of the couple's four daughters, Gwen, was born in 1963. Cissy followed in 1964. At this time, Adele Graham began 25 years of service as a school volunteer.

She campaigned with her husband for his election to the Florida House and Florida Senate. During each session of the legislature, the entire family would move to Tallahassee. During the legislative years, Suzanne was born in 1967 and Kendall was born in 1969 in Tallahassee. The two years of campaigning for Governor were busy and productive, and the entire family took part. In 1978, Graham's husband was elected as the 38th Governor of Florida, and the family moved into the Governor's Mansion.

As First Lady of Florida, she became a leading advocate for the elderly. Her personal experiences with her older parents and their health needs led her to become a lobbyist, which had positive results. Florida began providing home-based services to older Floridians through the Community Care for the Elderly program. The ratings system and standards for nursing homes were improved. Under her leadership, Florida became the first state to license the Hospice program. In 1980, Graham served as Honorary Chairperson for the Governor's Conference on Aging and was an official to the 1981 White House Conference on Aging.

As an advocate for school volunteerism, she visited all 67 counties in Florida to promote school partnerships. The number of senior volunteers in Florida increased 100%.

As project chairman for the National Association of Partners in Education, she co-authored a book, Finish for the Future, that identifies outstanding private sector initiatives in public schools for dropout prevention.

Graham participated in establishing a dropout prevention partnership program at her alma mater, Miami Edison High School, and successfully raised money to help high school students tutor younger students.

Historic preservation has been among her interests. During the family's tenure in Tallahassee, she restored the Governor's Mansion and added a Florida sunroom to the state home. Along with Mary Call Collins, she helped to save the historic Union Bank, and participated in saving Miami Edison Middle School, which is now registered on the National Trust for Historic Preservation.

Her husband's public service continued in the United States Senate. During these years, as well as when she was First Lady, Graham served as Vice President of the Florida House, the state's embassy in the nation's capitol. She was also an active member of International Neighbor's Club # One in Washington, D.C.

Graham was awarded an Honorary Degree of Doctors of Laws from Barry University in recognition of her dedicated service as a wife, mother and educator. In 2005, she was named "A Woman of Impact" in Greater Miami, and the University of Florida honored her as an "Alumna of Outstanding Achievement."

== Education ==
Graham attended high school at Miami Edison High School. She was educated at the University of Florida and graduated from Boston University.

Graham's mother was of Scotch-Irish descent, and her father came from a family of Maronite Christians from Beirut, Lebanon.

Honorary titles
Preceded by Donna Lou Askew	First Lady of Florida; January 2, 1979 – January 3, 1987	Succeeded by Margie Mixson
