= Embry Kidd =

American judge (born 1983)

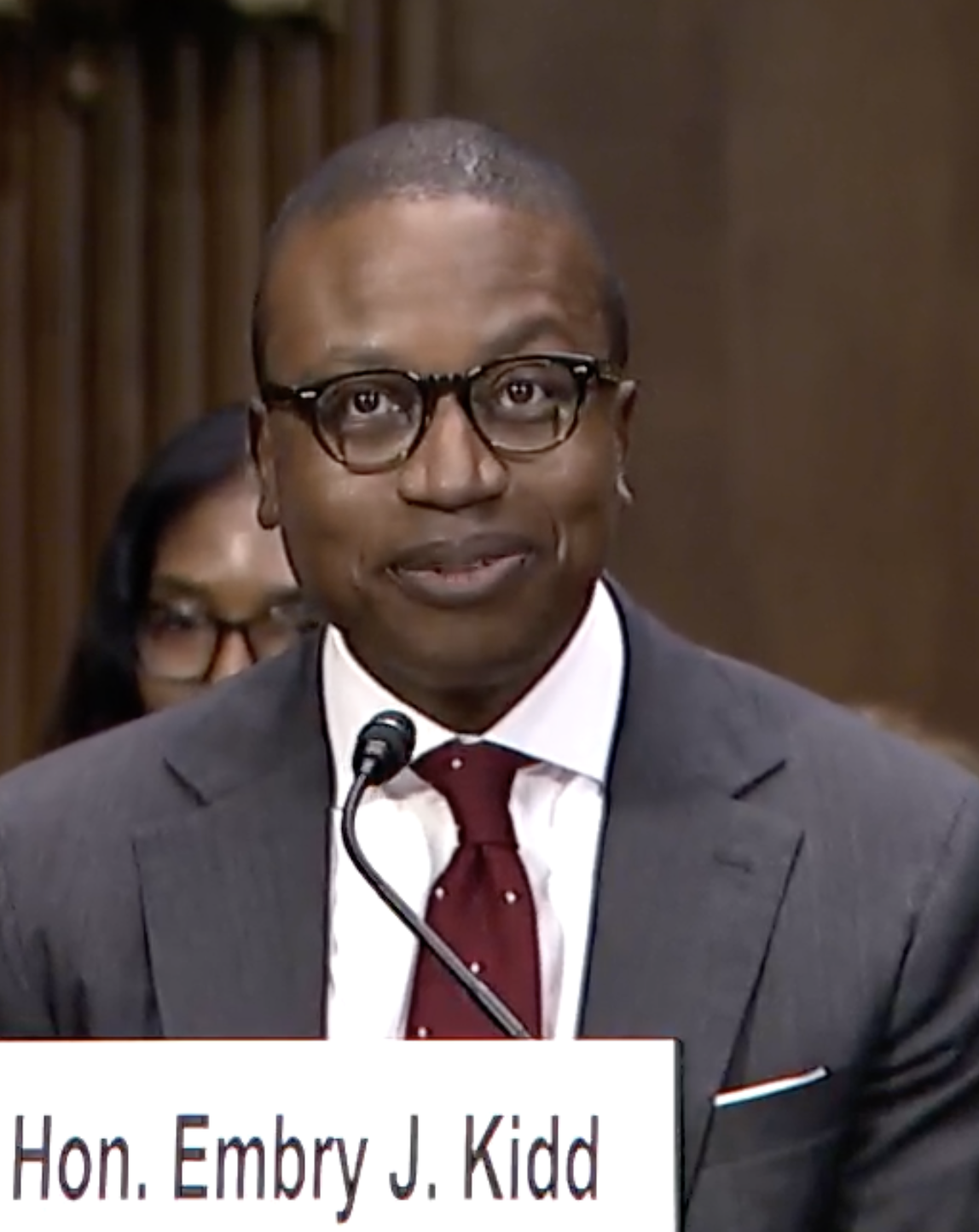

Judge of the United States Court of Appeals for the Eleventh Circuit
- Incumbent
- Assumed office January 2, 2025
- Appointed by: Joe Biden
- Preceded by: Charles Wilson

Personal details
- Born: Embry Jerode Kidd; 1983 (age 42–43) Birmingham, Alabama, U.S.
- Education: Emory University (BA); Yale University (JD)

Embry Jerode Kidd (born 1983) is an American lawyer who serves as a United States circuit judge of the United States Court of Appeals for the Eleventh Circuit. He previously served as a United States magistrate judge of the United States District Court for the Middle District of Florida.

== Education ==
Kidd was born in 1983 in Birmingham, Alabama. He attended Emory University on a full-tuition scholarship, graduating in 2005 with a Bachelor of Arts with high honors. He then attended the Yale Law School, where he was an editor of The Yale Law Journal and the Yale Journal of Law and Policy, as well as editor-in-chief of the Yale Journal of Law and the Humanities. He graduated in 2008 with a Juris Doctor.

== Career ==
After law school, Kidd was a law clerk to Judge Roger Gregory of the United States Court of Appeals for the Fourth Circuit from 2008 to 2009. From 2009 to 2014, he was an associate at Williams & Connolly in Washington, D.C. From 2014 to 2019, he served as an assistant United States attorney in the United States Attorney's Office for the Middle District of Florida. From 2022 through 2024, he taught as an adjunct professor at the Florida A&M University College of Law.

=== Federal judicial service ===
Kidd assumed office as a United States magistrate judge on July 25, 2019.

==== Court of appeals service ====
On May 8, 2024, President Joe Biden announced his intent to nominate Kidd to serve as a United States circuit judge of the United States Court of Appeals for the Eleventh Circuit. On May 24, 2024, his nomination was sent to the Senate. President Biden nominated Kidd to the seat vacated by Judge Charles R. Wilson, who subsequently assumed senior status on December 31, 2024. On June 5, 2024, a hearing on his nomination was held before the Senate Judiciary Committee. During his confirmation hearing, he was questioned by Republican Senators about his record and his views about a controversial law review article written by a law school classmate. On June 20, 2024, it was discovered that Kidd had withheld two overturned rulings from the U.S. Senate which involved child sex crimes. Republicans accused Kidd of being deceptive and extreme in his views. On July 11, 2024, his nomination was reported out of committee by a party line 11–10 vote. On November 14, 2024, the United States Senate invoked cloture on his nomination by a 49–44 vote, with Senator Joe Manchin voting against the motion. On November 18, 2024, his nomination was confirmed by a 49–45 vote, with Senator Manchin voting against his confirmation. He received his judicial commission on January 2, 2025.

== See also ==
- List of African American jurists
- List of African American federal judges
- Joe Biden judicial appointment controversies

Legal offices
Preceded by Charles Wilson	Judge of the United States Court of Appeals for the Eleventh Circuit; 2025–present	Incumbent
