= Joseph W. Hatchett =

American judge (1932–2021)

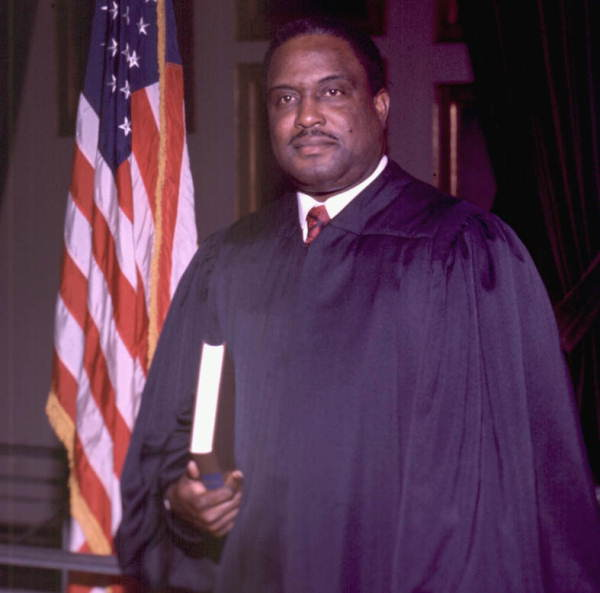

Chief Judge of the United States Court of Appeals for the Eleventh Circuit
- In office September 20, 1996 – May 14, 1999
- Preceded by: Gerald Bard Tjoflat
- Succeeded by: R. Lanier Anderson III

Judge of the United States Court of Appeals for the Eleventh Circuit
- In office October 1, 1981 – May 14, 1999
- Appointed by: operation of law
- Preceded by: Seat established
- Succeeded by: Charles R. Wilson

Judge of the United States Court of Appeals for the Fifth Circuit
- In office July 13, 1979 – October 1, 1981
- Appointed by: Jimmy Carter
- Preceded by: Seat established by 92 Stat. 1629
- Succeeded by: Seat abolished

Justice of the Florida Supreme Court
- In office September 2, 1975 – July 18, 1979
- Preceded by: David McCain
- Succeeded by: Parker Lee McDonald

Magistrate Judge of the United States District Court for the Middle District of Florida
- In office 1971–1975

Personal details
- Born: Joseph Woodrow Hatchett; September 17, 1932 Clearwater, Florida, U.S.
- Died: April 30, 2021 (aged 88) Tallahassee, Florida, U.S.
- Education: Florida A&M University (BA); Howard University School of Law (JD)

Military service
- Allegiance: United States
- Branch/service: United States Army
- Years of service: 1954-1956

Joseph Woodrow Hatchett (September 17, 1932 – April 30, 2021) was an American lawyer and judge. He worked in private practice, was a United States circuit judge of the United States Court of Appeals for the Fifth Circuit and Eleventh Circuit, and served on the Florida Supreme Court.

== Education and career ==
Hatchett was born in Clearwater, Florida, and attended segregated Pinellas High School. His brother and sister also pursued careers in public service.

Hatchett graduated from Florida A&M University with a Bachelor of Arts degree in 1954. He served in the United States Army as a lieutenant from 1954 to 1956. He graduated from Howard University School of Law with a Juris Doctor in 1959. He was in the private practice of law in Daytona Beach from 1959 to 1966. He was a cooperating attorney for the NAACP Legal Defense Fund from 1960 to 1966. He served in the United States Marine Corps Reserve as a lieutenant colonel and judge advocate from 1977 to 1988. He was a consultant for the Daytona Beach Urban Renewal Department from 1963 to 1966. He was an Assistant United States Attorney for the Middle District of Florida from 1966 to 1971. He was First Assistant United States Attorney from 1967 to 1971. He was a special hearing officer for conscientious objectors in the United States Department of Justice from 1967 to 1968.

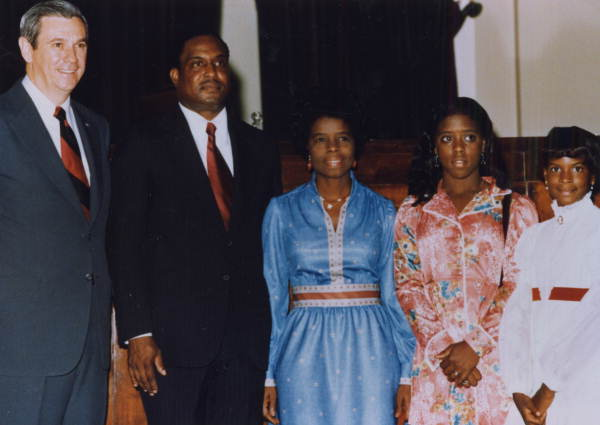
Hatchett's family with Florida governor Reubin Askew, who had just appointed him to the state Supreme Court

In 1975, Governor Reubin Askew appointed Hatchett to an associate justice seat on the Florida Supreme Court, replacing David McCain, who had resigned from the court while being investigated for corruption. Retained in office in the 1976 general election, Hatchett served until 1979. He was the first African American to serve as a Florida Supreme Court Justice, and the first successfully retained on the Florida Supreme Court in a statewide election. Governor Askew noted at the time of his appointment that Hatchett's race was a "major consideration" in his selection, coming only a few years after the appointment of Thurgood Marshall as the first black U.S. Supreme Court justice.

== Federal judicial service ==
Hatchett served as a United States Magistrate of the United States District Court for the Middle District of Florida from 1971 to 1975 before being appointed to the Florida Supreme Court.

Hatchett was nominated by President Jimmy Carter on May 17, 1979, to the United States Court of Appeals for the Fifth Circuit, to a new seat authorized by 92 Stat. 1629. He was confirmed by the United States Senate on July 12, 1979, and received his commission on July 13, 1979. His service terminated on October 1, 1981, due to reassignment to the Eleventh Circuit. Hatchett was the first African American to serve on a Federal Appeals Court in the Deep South.

Hatchett was reassigned by operation of law on October 1, 1981, to the United States Court of Appeals for the Eleventh Circuit, to a new seat authorized by 94 Stat. 1994. He served as Chief Judge from 1996 to 1999. His service terminated on May 14, 1999, due to retirement. He was Member of the Judicial Conference of the United States from 1997 to 1999.

== Post-judicial career ==
In April 2018, Hatchett became an attorney with the law firm Akerman LLP (formerly Akerman Senterfitt) in Tallahassee, Florida.

He died on April 30, 2021.

== Honors ==
Hatchett held an honorary Doctor of Laws (LL.D.) degree from four institutions, including Florida Memorial College (1978), Stetson Law School (1980), Florida A&M University (1996) and Howard University (1998).

An effort to honor Hatchett by renaming the United States Courthouse in Tallahassee after him, S. 2938, passed in the U.S. House of Representatives on June 24, 2022. President Joe Biden signed the measure into law through the Bipartisan Safer Communities Act on June 25, 2022. It is now the Joseph Hatchett United States Courthouse.

== See also ==
- List of African-American federal judges
- List of African-American jurists

Political offices
Preceded by David McCain	Justice of the Florida Supreme Court; 1975–1979	Succeeded by Parker Lee McDonald
Legal offices
Preceded by Seat established by 92 Stat. 1629	Judge of the United States Court of Appeals for the Fifth Circuit; 1979–1981	Succeeded by Seat abolished
Preceded by Seat established	Judge of the United States Court of Appeals for the Eleventh Circuit; 1981–1999	Succeeded by Charles R. Wilson
Preceded by Gerald Bard Tjoflat	Chief Judge of the United States Court of Appeals for the Eleventh Circuit; 1996–1999	Succeeded by R. Lanier Anderson III
