= Bob Graham 2004 presidential campaign =

American political campaign

- Campaign: 2004 United States presidential election (Democratic Party primaries)
- Candidate: Bob Graham; United States Senator from Florida (1987–2005); Governor of Florida (1979–1987)
- Affiliation: Democratic Party
- EC formed: February 27, 2003
- Announced: May 6, 2003
- Suspended: October 6, 2003

Website
- grahamforpresident.com (archived - May 26, 2003)

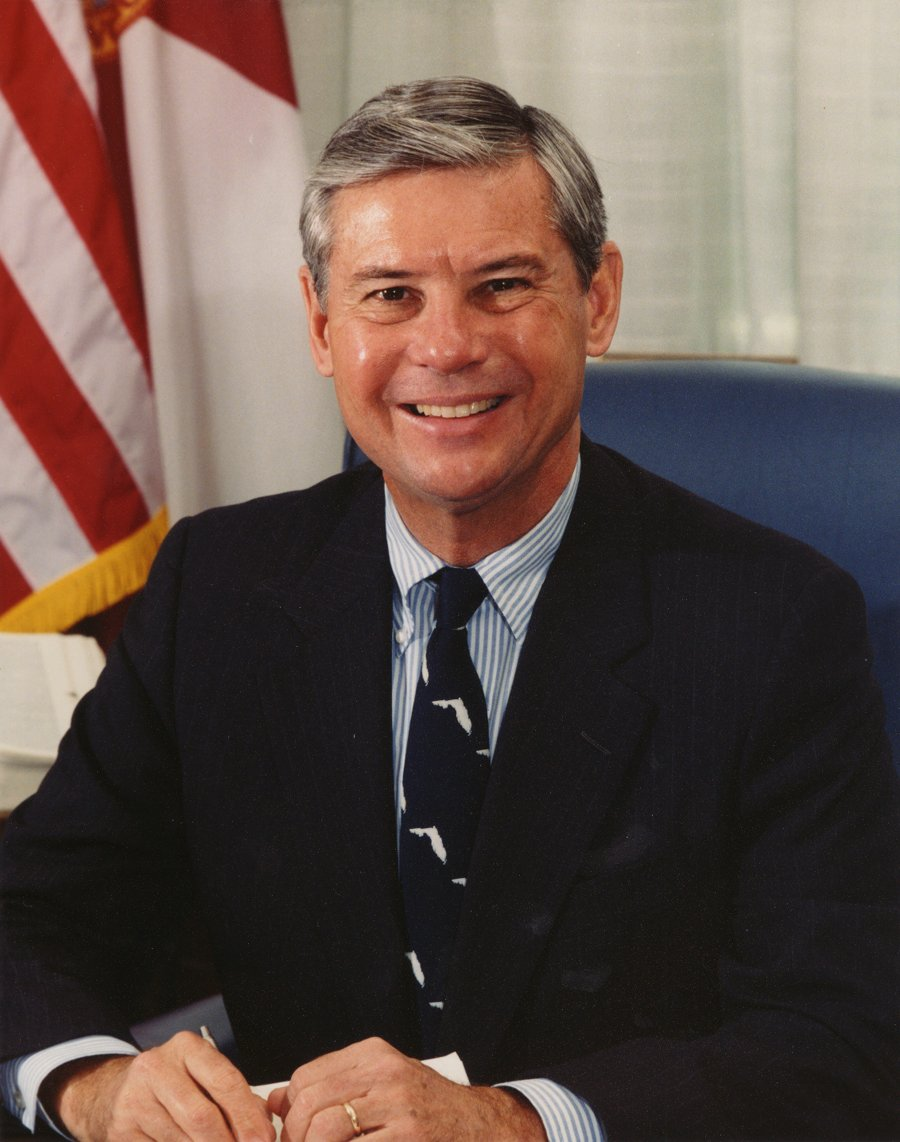
Senator Bob Graham (D-FL)

Bob Graham was a candidate for President of the United States in the 2004 Democratic Party presidential primaries.

At the time of the campaign, Graham was the senior United States senator from Florida. His campaign exploratory committee began on February 27, 2003, and on May 6, he announced his formal entry into the race. He dropped out on October 6, 2003.

== Background ==
Graham's name had a long presence in presidential and vice presidential politics, due to his popularity as governor and senator. In 1984 there was a movement to draft him for vice president on a ticket headed by Walter Mondale, but this effort finally went for nothing. He was also seriously considered by three successive presidential nominees (Michael Dukakis in 1988, Bill Clinton in 1992 and Al Gore in 2000) as their running-mate, each time appearing on their finalist list. He also harbored Presidential ambitions for years.

Graham's relatively low-key national profile was significantly raised after the September 11 attacks. He served as a chairman of the United States Senate Select Committee on Intelligence and had a steady stream of TV appearances during the war on terrorism, soon becoming one of the best-known politicians.

He also represented a key swing state, Florida, which decided the 2000 presidential election results. Winning Florida four years later might possibly give Democrats the White House. Graham had won re-election in 1998 in a landslide (with 62.47% of the vote), and had never lost any election before (many of them by a similarly high margin).

Graham's potential nomination was considered by many as appealing, due to his moderate stance. He also would appeal to the Democratic core due to his opposition to the early Iraq War (he voted against the authorization of use of military force in 2002), and his pro-environmental record. Senator Graham held a reputation as a bright man in politics, with a good sense of humor, and he was never implicated in any scandal.

Among his political cons, however, were his cited lack of charisma, his relatively older age (67 in 2004) and recent medical problems.

== Campaign ==
His campaign began on February 27, 2003, when he filed papers to form an exploratory committee, after delaying his intent to announce on February 3 due to having heart surgery on January 31. On May 6, he formally announced his entering into the race for President of the United States in the 2004 election on the Democratic ticket.

His candidacy did not find ground, overshadowed by earlier front-runners. He performed very poorly in polls, regularly taking last place. He also cited huge fundraising problems. Howard Dean took the role of key opposition against the Iraqi war among Democratic candidates, even if Graham had been initially predicted for this role (he was the only one of the 2004 Democratic candidates who voted against authorization).

He dropped out on October 6, 2003, the first major candidate to do so, and did not win a single vote in the primaries.

Graham was mentioned as a possible running-mate for John Kerry, an eventual nominee (mostly in order to win Florida), but the Massachusetts senator finally selected John Edwards. Graham decided to not seek a fourth Senate term and retired from active politics on January 3, 2005.

== Endorsements ==
=== Members of Congress ===
- Senator Bill Nelson of Florida
- Representative Allen Boyd of Florida
- Representative Corrine Brown of Florida
- Representative Jim Davis of Florida
- Representative Peter Deutsch of Florida
- Representative Alcee Hastings of Florida
- Representative Kendrick Meek of Florida
- Former Representative Jim Bacchus of Florida
- Former Representative Ben Jones of Georgia

=== Other individuals ===
- Former Governor and Lieutenant Governor Wayne Mixson of Florida
- Former Speaker of the Florida House of Representatives Jon Mills
- State Senate Minority Leader Ron Klein of Florida
- Chairman of the Florida Democratic Party Scott Maddox
- Mayor Alex Penelas of Miami, Florida
- Former Florida First Lady Rhea Chiles
- Florida State Senator Rod Smith
