= Peter Oppenheim =

American lawyer and political advisor

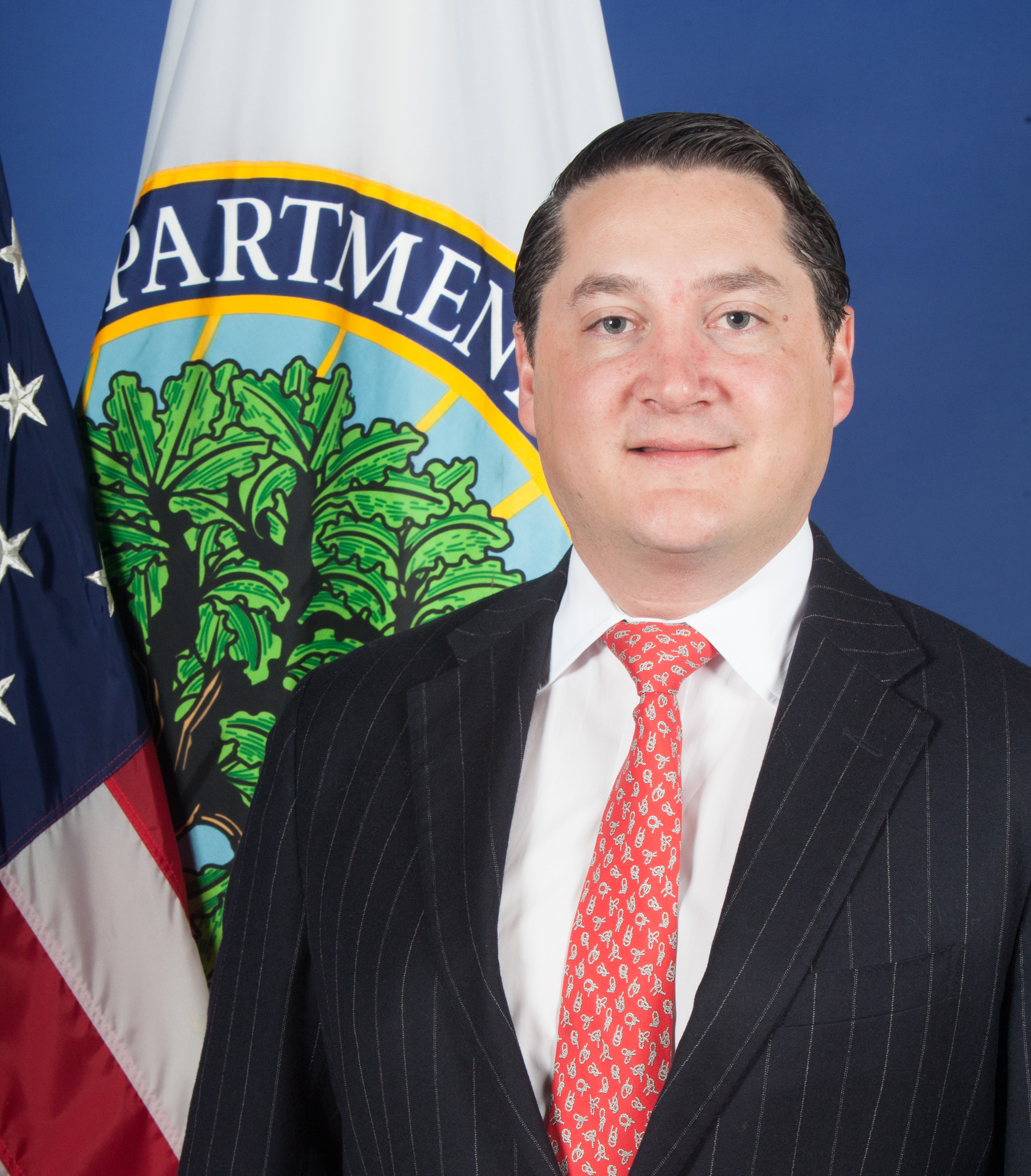

Assistant Secretary of Education for Legislation and Congressional Affairs
- In office December 1, 2017 – June 12, 2019
- President: Donald Trump
- Secretary: Betsy DeVos
- Preceded by: Julius L. Horwich
- Succeeded by: Gwen Graham

Personal details
- Born: Peter Louis Oppenheim; September 1, 1973 (age 52)
- Education: Colby College; Washington College of Law

Peter Louis Oppenheim (born September 1, 1973) is an American lawyer and political advisor who currently serves as General Counsel for the United States Senate Committee on Health, Education, Labor, and Pensions. Prior to assuming his current role, he served as Assistant Secretary of Education for Legislation and Congressional Affairs at the United States Department of Education.

== Biography ==
Oppenheim was an aide to U.S. Senator Lamar Alexander, advising him on education, labor, and pension policy. While working for Alexander, he assisted the senator in drafting the Every Student Succeeds Act, which was signed into law in 2015. He has also worked for the Carmen Group, as a public policy research assistant for Newt Gingrich, as a finance coordinator for the Republican Governors Association, and as a project manager for the Republican National Committee.

According to Education Week, Oppenheim "has a reputation for being able to work across the aisle."
