= Bill Pearce (politician) =

American politician in Florida

B. C. "Bill" Pearce
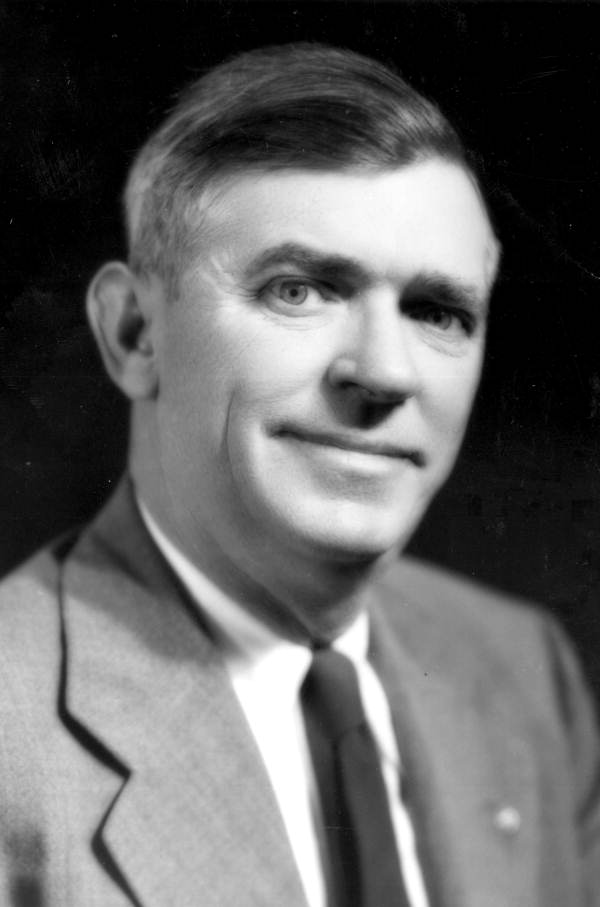
- Pearce in 1947

Member of the Florida Senate from the 26th district
- In office 1947–1965

Member of the Florida House of Representatives from Putnam County
- In office 1933–1934

Personal details
- Born: Basil Charles Pearce; November 29, 1894 Columbia, Alabama, U.S.
- Died: August 2, 1968 (aged 73) Palatka, Florida, U.S.
- Party: Democratic
- Children: one
- Occupation: farmer

Basil Charles "Bill" Pearce (November 29, 1894 – August 2, 1968) was an American politician in the state of Florida.

Pearce was born in Columbia, Alabama. He resided in East Palatka, Florida and was a farmer. Pearce also was a veteran of World War I, having served in France with the United States Army Corps of Engineers. He served in the Florida State Senate from 1947 to 1965 as a Democratic member for the 26th district. He also served briefly in the Florida House of Representatives, from 1933 to 1934. He was a member of the Pork Chop Gang, a group of legislators from rural areas that dominated the state legislature due to malapportionment and used their power to engage in McCarthyist tactics.
