= David McCain =

American judge (1931–1986)

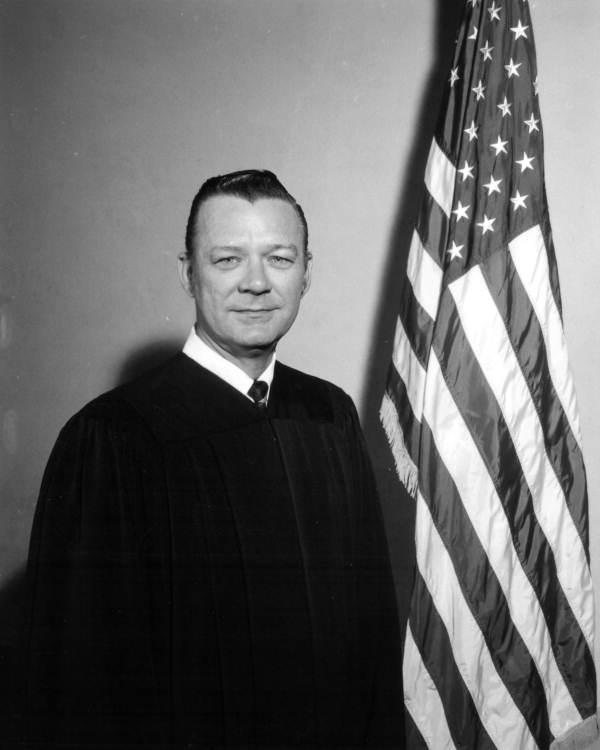
- McCain in 1970

Justice of the Florida Supreme Court
- In office December 14, 1970 – August 31, 1975
- Appointed by: Claude R. Kirk Jr.
- Preceded by: B. Campbell Thornal
- Succeeded by: Joseph W. Hatchett

Personal details
- Born: July 23, 1931 Sebastian, Florida, U.S.
- Died: November 11, 1986 (aged 55) Jacksonville, Florida, U.S.

David Lucius McCain (July 23, 1931 – November 11, 1986) was a justice of the Supreme Court of Florida from December 14, 1970, to August 31, 1975, when he resigned after being accused of taking bribes. He then became an accused drug smuggler, and was for several years a fugitive, until his death.

== Early life, education, and career ==
Born in Sebastian, Florida, McCain graduated from the University of Florida in 1955 and entered the practice of law, where he was successful as a trial lawyer. In 1966, he joined the Republican Party to support the candidacy of Claude R. Kirk Jr., who won the gubernatorial race and appointed McCain to the Florida Fourth District Court of Appeal. This comes on the heels of McCain attempted to run for a seat in the Florida House of Representatives; where after he lost, he switched his party affiliation in 1962. McCain ran for a seat on the Florida Supreme Court in 1968.

== Judicial service ==
McCain ran for a seat on the Florida Supreme Court in 1968, but was defeated by Justice Adkins. When Justice Thornal died two years later, Governor Kirk appointed McCain to that seat. McCain was discovered to be taking bribes, and resigned from the court days before the beginning of an impeachment trial.

== Later life and death ==
Following his resignation from the court, McCain was disbarred, and was accused of being involved in drug smuggling as part of Operation Everglades. He was indicted on four felony counts, but never convicted and skipped bail in 1983, becoming a fugitive for the remainder of his life.

While living under the name "Thomas Mills", McCain discovered that he had cancer, and contemplated turning himself in, but died before he had the chance, in Jacksonville, Florida at the age of 55. His body was discovered in a Jacksonville apartment rented under the name, Thomas Mills, but authorities determined that the body was that of McCain.

Political offices
Preceded by B. Campbell Thornal	Justice of the Florida Supreme Court; 1970–1975	Succeeded by Joseph W. Hatchett
