= Parker Lee McDonald =

American judge

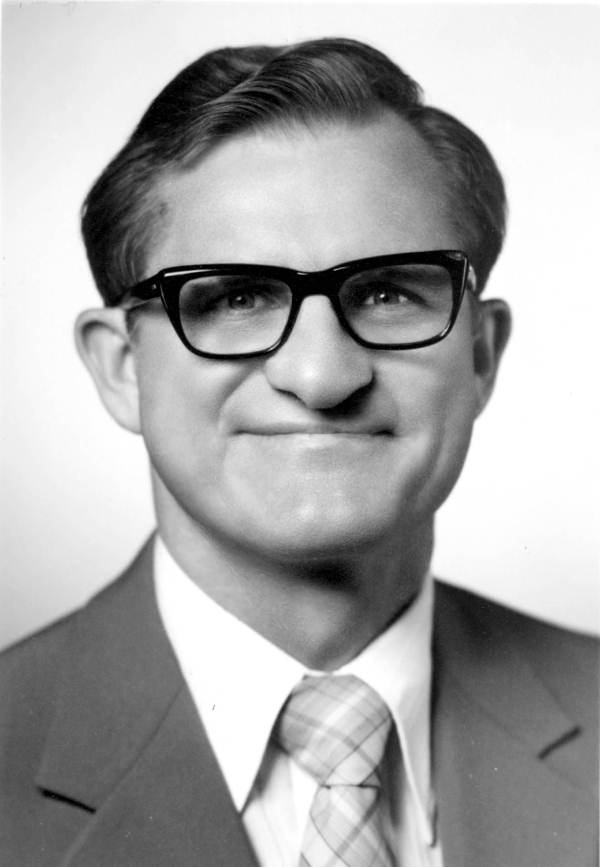

Justice for the Florida Supreme Court
- In office October 26, 1979 – May 31, 1994
- Preceded by: Joseph W. Hatchett
- Succeeded by: Charles T. Wells

Personal details
- Born: May 23, 1924 Sebring, Florida
- Died: June 24, 2017 (aged 93) Tallahassee, Florida

Parker Lee McDonald (May 23, 1924 – June 24, 2017) was a justice of the Florida Supreme Court.

He was a judge from the U.S. state of Florida. McDonald served as a Florida Supreme Court justice from 1979 to 1994, and was chief justice from 1986 to 1988.

McDonald graduated from the University of Florida with his bachelor's degree in business administration, where he was a member of the Chi Phi fraternity. He received his law degree from the University of Florida as well. McDonald died on June 24, 2017, at his home in Tallahassee, Florida.
