= Bob Graham =

American politician (1936–2024)

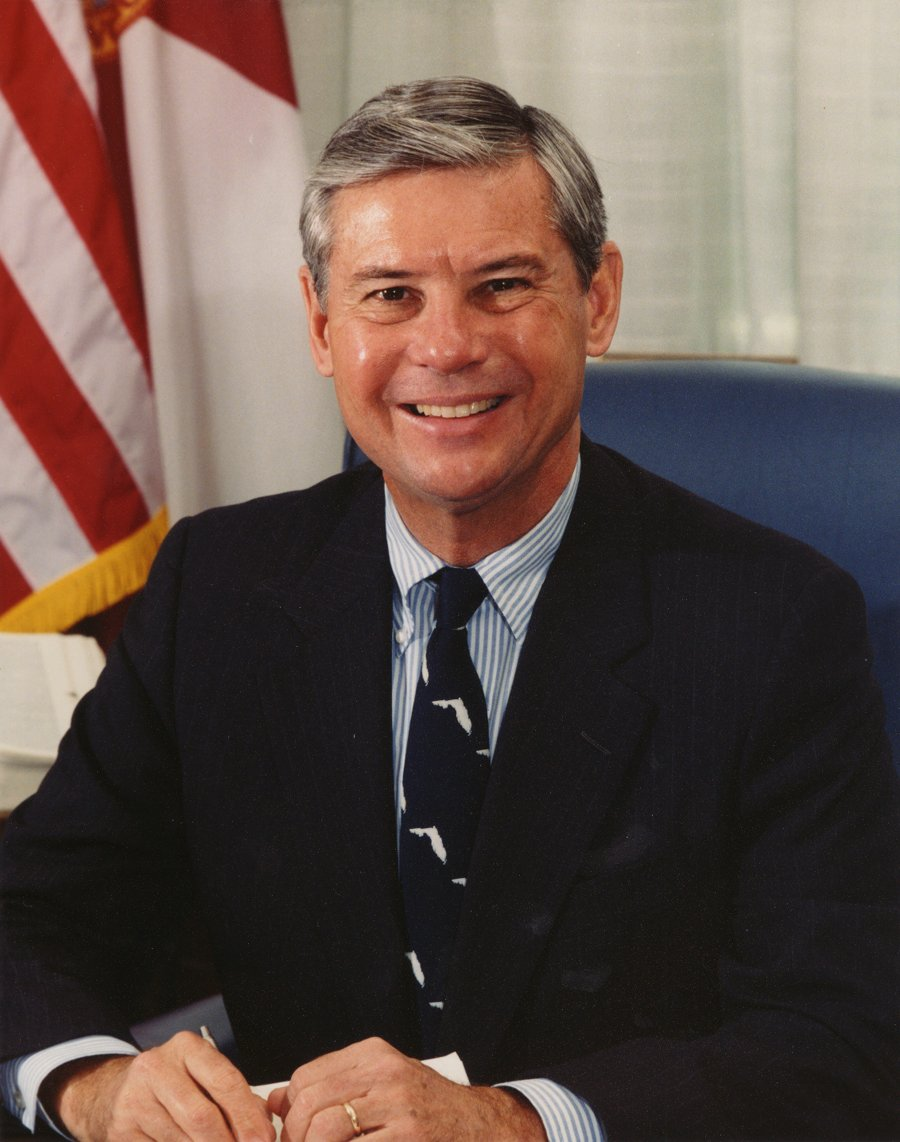
- Official portrait, 1993

United States Senator from Florida
- In office January 3, 1987 – January 3, 2005
- Preceded by: Paula Hawkins
- Succeeded by: Mel Martínez
Committee positions
Chair of the Senate Intelligence Committee
In office June 6, 2001 – January 3, 2003
| Preceded by | Richard Shelby |
| Succeeded by | Pat Roberts |
In office January 3, 2001 – January 20, 2001
| Preceded by | Richard Shelby |
| Succeeded by | Richard Shelby |
Ranking Member of the Senate Intelligence Committee
In office January 20, 2001 – June 6, 2001
| Preceded by | Richard Bryan |
| Succeeded by | Richard Shelby |

38th Governor of Florida
- In office January 2, 1979 – January 3, 1987
- Lieutenant: Wayne Mixson
- Preceded by: Reubin Askew
- Succeeded by: Wayne Mixson

Member of the Florida Senate
- In office November 3, 1970 – November 7, 1978
- Preceded by: Richard Stone
- Succeeded by: John Hill
- Constituency: 48th district (1970–1972); 33rd district (1972–1978)

Member of the Florida House of Representatives
- In office November 8, 1966 – November 3, 1970
- Preceded by: Constituency established
- Succeeded by: Sherman Winn
- Constituency: Dade County Group 16 (1966–1967); 105th district (1967–1970)

Personal details
- Born: Daniel Robert Graham; November 9, 1936 Coral Gables, Florida, U.S.
- Died: April 16, 2024 (aged 87) Gainesville, Florida, U.S.
- Party: Democratic
- Spouse: Adele Khoury (m. 1959)
- Children: 4, including Gwen
- Relatives: Ernest Graham (father); Phil Graham (half-brother); Katharine Graham (sister-in-law); Jimmy Carter (fourth cousin)
- Education: University of Florida (BA); Harvard University (LLB)

Daniel Robert Graham (November 9, 1936 – April 16, 2024) was an American politician and lawyer who served as the 38th governor of Florida from 1979 to 1987 and represented Florida in the United States Senate from 1987 to 2005. He was a member of the Democratic Party.

Born in Coral Gables, Florida, Graham won election to the Florida House of Representatives after graduating from Harvard Law School. After serving in both houses of the Florida Legislature, Graham won the 1978 Florida gubernatorial election, and was reelected in 1982. In the 1986 Senate elections, Graham defeated incumbent Republican Senator Paula Hawkins. He helped found the Democratic Leadership Council and eventually became Chairman of the Senate Intelligence Committee. Graham ran for the 2004 Democratic presidential nomination, but dropped out before the first primaries. He declined to seek reelection in 2004 and retired from the Senate.

Graham co-chaired the National Commission on the BP Deepwater Horizon Oil Spill and Offshore Drilling. He was also a member of the Financial Crisis Inquiry Commission and the CIA External Advisory Board. He founded the Bob Graham Center for Public Service at his undergraduate alma mater, the University of Florida. He also served as Chairman of the Commission on the Prevention of WMD proliferation and terrorism. Through the WMD policy center he advocated for the recommendations in the Commission's report, "World at Risk".

== Early life ==
Graham was born in Coral Gables, Florida, to Hilda Elizabeth (née Simmons), a schoolteacher, and Ernest R. Graham, a Florida state senator, mining engineer, and dairy/cattleman. He was the youngest of four children. His older half-brother, Phil Graham, was publisher and co-owner of The Washington Post. He married Adele Khoury, of Miami Shores, in 1959. They had four children. One of their daughters, Gwen Graham, was a U.S. Representative from Florida from 2015 to 2017. In 2021, Gwen Graham was confirmed as Assistant Secretary of the United States Department of Education.

Bob Graham attended Miami Senior High School from 1952 to 1955; he was student body president his senior year. He was International Trustee of the Key Club, the Kiwanis service organization. While at Miami High, Graham was the recipient of the Sigma Chi Award, the school's highest honor. He received a bachelor's degree in 1959 in political science from the University of Florida, where he was a member of the Epsilon Zeta chapter of Sigma Nu fraternity and was inducted into Phi Beta Kappa, the University of Florida Hall of Fame, and Florida Blue Key. He earned a Bachelor of Laws from Harvard Law School in 1962.

== Political career ==
Graham was elected to the Florida Senate in 1970, from Dade County. Redistricted into a seat encompassing portions of northern Dade and southern Broward County, Graham was reelected to District 33 in 1972 and 1976.

=== Workdays ===
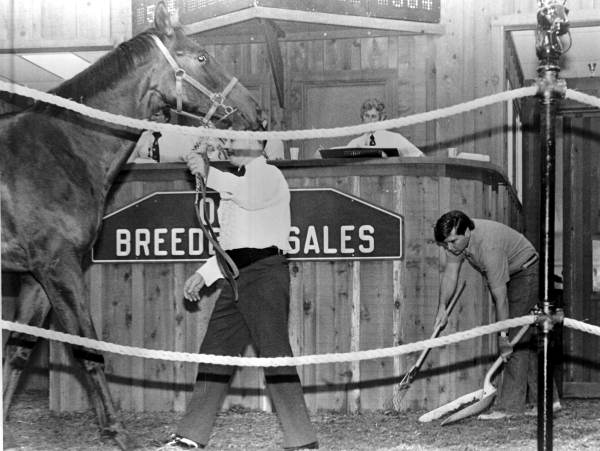
State Senator Bob Graham during workday as a "Pooper scooper" for Ocala Breeders Sales on October 9, 1977.

Graham's campaign trademark was to work full eight-hour days at various jobs representing Florida's constituents. In 1974, Graham was on the Education Committee when it traveled to local Florida jurisdictions. After a public meeting in Miami, a frustrated English teacher, M. Sue Riley, said to Graham, "The main problem with the Education Committee is no one has any experience in education." Taken aback, Graham responded, "Well, what can I do about that?" Riley then arranged for Graham to teach a semester of civics at Miami Carol City Senior High School. Three years later, Graham used his "workday" idea to kick-start his gubernatorial campaign. Throughout 1977 and into 1978, Graham conducted 100 workdays, including bellhop, tomato picker, and road construction paver. To stay legitimate, he worked an entire day, kept the press at a distance, and performed all aspects of the job. Graham performed more than 400 workdays during his political career.

=== Governor of Florida ===
Graham was elected Governor of Florida in 1978 after a seven-way Democratic primary race in which he initially placed second to Robert Shevin. His supporters at the time dubbed themselves "Graham crackers."

In his first month as governor, Graham established a 22-member Florida Tax Commission, headed by Lieutenant Governor Wayne Mixson, to recommend policy to "make taxes more fair". In January 1979, he appointed Florida state senators Buddy MacKay and Ken Myers; Florida state representatives Gwen Margolis and Carl Ogden; businessman Dick Wells and others to the commission.

Graham emphasized education and focused on improving the state's public universities. In addition, Graham's administration focused on economic diversification and environmental policies. During his tenure as governor, the state added 1.2 million jobs, and for the first time in state history, Floridians' per capita income exceeded the U.S. average.

Graham also launched the most extensive environmental protection program in Florida history, focused on preserving endangered lands. During his tenure, thousands of acres of threatened and environmentally important lands were brought into state ownership for permanent protection. His keystone accomplishment was the establishment of the Save the Everglades program, which has now been joined by the federal government in a commitment to restore the Everglades.

Graham left the governorship with an 83% approval rating. According to The New York Times, he was one of Florida's most popular politicians.

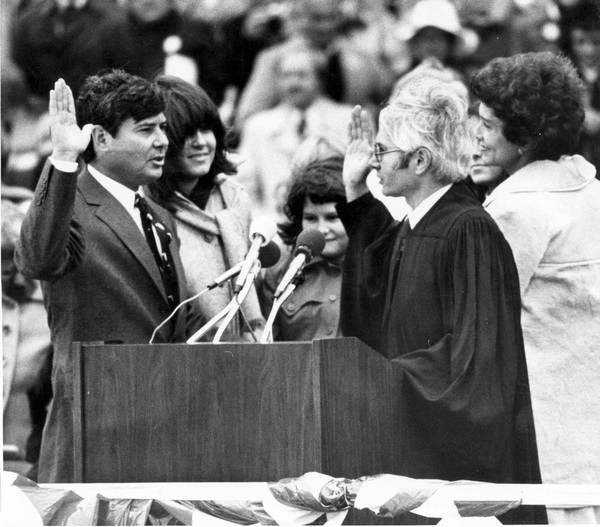
Graham sworn in as governor, January 1979

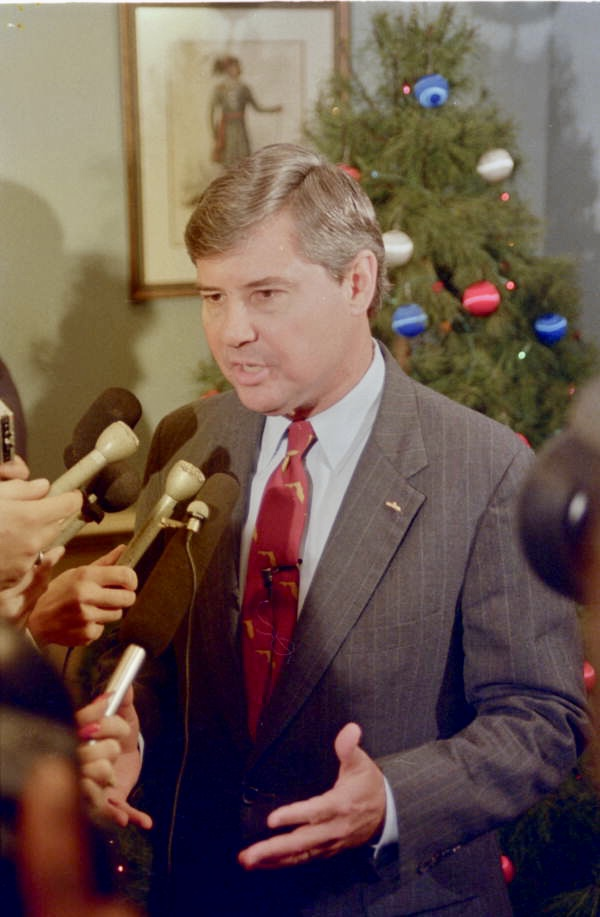
Graham delivering his last public address as governor before assuming his Senate seat

=== U.S. Senator ===
Graham was elected to the U.S. Senate in 1986, defeating incumbent Senator Paula Hawkins, 55% to 45%. He was reelected in 1992 (over Bill Grant, 66% to 34%) and 1998 (over Charlie Crist, 63% to 37%) and chose not to seek reelection in 2004. Upon retiring from the Senate in January 2005, Graham had served 38 consecutive years in public office.

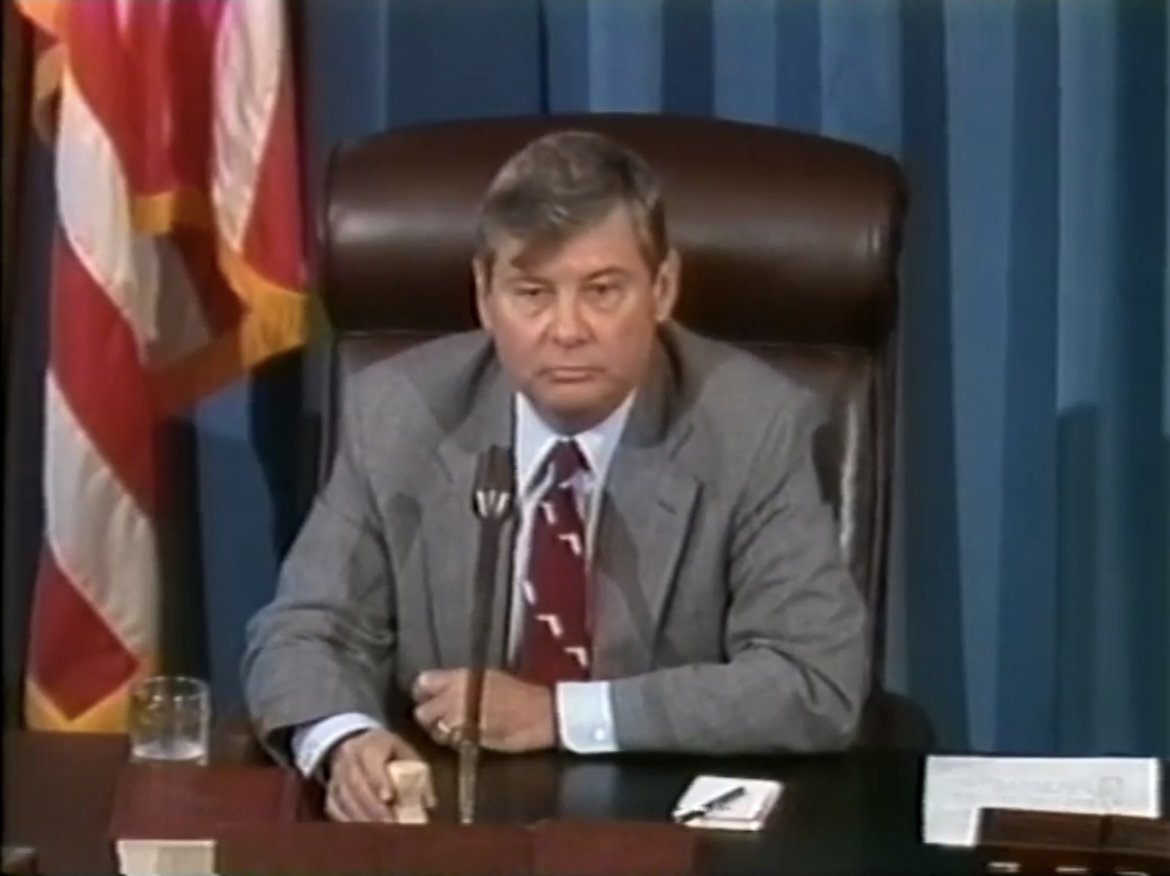
Graham presiding over the U.S. Senate during the vote on Supreme Court nomination for Robert Bork, October 1987

Graham served 10 years on the U.S. Senate Select Committee on Intelligence, which he chaired during and after 9/11 and the run-up to the Iraq war. He led the joint congressional investigation into 9/11. As chair of the Intelligence Committee, Graham opposed the War in Iraq and was one of the 23 senators to vote against President George W. Bush's request for authorization of the use of military force. After meeting with military leaders in February 2002 and requesting and reviewing a National Intelligence Estimate, he said he "felt we were being manipulated and that the result was going to distract us from where our real enemies were". He continued to oppose the Iraq War, saying in 2008: "I'm afraid I never wavered from my belief that this was a distraction that was going to come to a bad end in Iraq and an even worse end in Afghanistan".

In 2004, Graham published Intelligence Matters: The CIA, the FBI, Saudi Arabia and the Failure of America's War on Terror.

Graham had a well-known habit of meticulously logging his daily activities (some as mundane as when he ate a tuna sandwich or rewound a tape of Ace Ventura) on color-coded notebooks, which Salon.com suggested in 2003 may have harmed his standing as a possible vice presidential candidate. The notebooks are now housed at the University of Florida library.

=== Presidential and vice presidential politics ===
Graham was considered as a Democratic nominee for Vice President of the United States in 1988, 1992, 2000, and 2004. He was a finalist on Bill Clinton's shortlist of running mates in 1992, and was also considered by Al Gore in 2000.

==== 2004 presidential election ====
In December 2002, Graham announced his candidacy for President of the United States in the 2004 election. However, he withdrew from the race in October 2003, several months after heart surgery, and retired from the Senate the following year.

== After politics ==
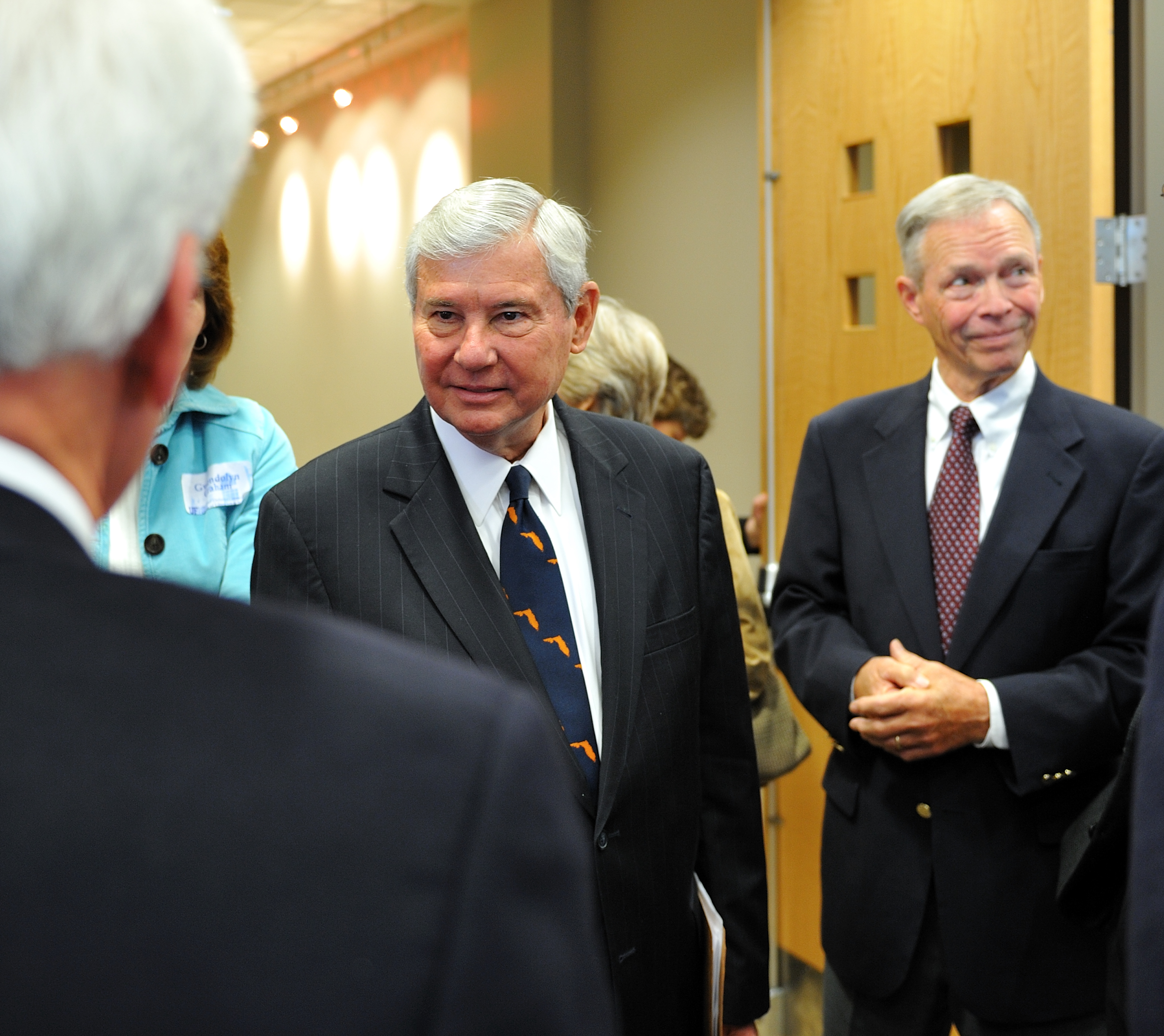
Graham (center), with former Florida Governor Buddy MacKay (right) at the dedication ceremony for Pugh Hall, home of the Graham Center for Public Service at the University of Florida

Graham spent the 2005–2006 academic year at Harvard University, where he was a fellow at the Institute of Politics. He and his wife lived among undergraduates in Mather House for the year. As a fellow, Graham taught a weekly study group about effective citizenship. During his time at Harvard, Graham began work on a book about effective citizenship, which would later become America, the Owner's Manual. Later, he would credit his undergraduate assistants at Harvard, as well as professors Archon Fung, David King, and Robert D. Putnam, as having helped him understand and conceive of the ideas that would become the book.

After his year at Harvard, Graham focused on founding a center to train future political leaders at the University of Florida, where he earned his bachelor's degree in political science in 1959.

The Bob Graham Center for Public Service is housed within the College of Liberal Arts and Sciences at the University of Florida. It provides students with opportunities to train for future leadership positions, and allows them to engage with policy makers and scholars in the university community. On February 9, 2008, The James and Alexis Pugh Hall, funded by longtime friends of the Graham family, was dedicated in the historic area of campus. Pugh Hall serves as the Center's home as well as the university's oral history and African and Asian languages programs.

In 2009, Graham published America, The Owner's Manual: Making Government Work for You, a book about inspiring and teaching citizens to effectively participate in democracy. In 2016, Sen. Graham and co-author Chris Hand released an update to America: The Owner's Manual, entitled America, The Owner's Manual: You Can Fight City Hall — And Win.

In the years after his retirement from the Senate, Graham published almost 70 op-eds on state and national issues. He was also a member of the Inter-American Dialogue, a think tank based in Washington, D.C.

In 2011, Graham published his only novel, the thriller The Keys to the Kingdom. He also wrote four nonfiction books, Workdays: Finding Florida on the Job, Intelligence Matters, World at Risk, and America: The Owner's Manual, and an illustrated children's book, Rhoda the Alligator.

== Death ==
Graham's health declined after a stroke in 2020. On April 16, 2024, he died at a retirement community in Gainesville, Florida, at the age of 87. His body lay in state in Florida's Historic Capitol before being buried in a private family service. He is buried in Oakland Cemetery, Tallahassee, Florida.

== Honors ==
On May 6, 2006, at the spring commencement for the College of Liberal Arts and Sciences, the University of Florida awarded Graham an honorary doctorate, the Doctor of Public Service.

On November 18, 2005, the Florida Legislature renamed the Sunshine Skyway Bridge, which was rebuilt during Graham's time as governor, the Bob Graham Sunshine Skyway Bridge.

Florida House of Representatives
| New constituency | Member of the Florida House of Representatives from the Dade County Group 16 district 1966–1967 | Constituency abolished |
| New constituency | Member of the Florida House of Representatives from the 105th district 1967–1970 | Succeeded by Sherman Winn |
Florida Senate
| Preceded by Richard Stone | Member of the Florida Senate from the 48th district 1970–1972 | Constituency abolished |
| Preceded by Philip Lewis | Member of the Florida Senate from the 33rd district 1972–1978 | Succeeded by John Hill |
Party political offices
| Preceded by Reubin Askew | Democratic nominee for Governor of Florida; 1978, 1982 | Succeeded by Steve Pajcic |
| Preceded by Max Baucus, Joe Biden, David L. Boren, Barbara Boxer, Robert Byrd, Dante Fascell, Bill Gray, Tom Harkin, Dee Huddleston, Carl Levin, Tip O'Neill, Claiborne Pell | Response to the State of the Union address 1985; Served alongside: Bill Clinton, Tip O'Neill | Succeeded by Tom Daschle, Bill Gray, George Mitchell, Chuck Robb, Harriett Woods |
| Preceded by Bill Gunter | Democratic nominee for U.S. Senator from Florida (Class 3); 1986, 1992, 1998 | Succeeded by Betty Castor |
| Preceded by Chuck Robb | Chair of the Democratic Senatorial Campaign Committee; 1993–1995 | Succeeded by Bob Kerrey |
| New office | Chair of the Senate New Democrat Coalition; 2000–2003 | Succeeded by Tom Carper; Mary Landrieu |
Political offices
| Preceded by Reubin Askew | Governor of Florida; 1979–1987 | Succeeded by Wayne Mixson |
U.S. Senate
| Preceded by Paula Hawkins | United States Senator (Class 3) from Florida; 1987–2005; Served alongside: Lawton Chiles, Connie Mack, Bill Nelson | Succeeded by Mel Martinez |
| Preceded by Richard Shelby | Chair of the Senate Intelligence Committee; 2001–2003 | Succeeded by Pat Roberts |
| Preceded by Arlen Specter | Ranking Member of the Senate Veterans' Affairs Committee; 2003–2005 | Succeeded by Daniel Akaka |
Government offices
| New office | Chair of the National Commission on the BP Deepwater Horizon Oil Spill and Offshore Drilling; 2010–2011; Served alongside: William Reilly | Position abolished |
