= Rodham =

Rodham may refer to:

== People ==
=== Surname ===
- Members of the Rodham family:
  - Hillary Rodham Clinton (born 1947), American politician
  - Dorothy Howell Rodham (1919–2011), American homemaker and mother of Hillary Clinton
  - Hugh Ellsworth Rodham (1911–1993), American businessman and father of Hillary Clinton
  - Hugh Edwin Rodham (born 1950), American lawyer and politician, brother of Hillary Clinton
  - Tony Rodham (1954–2019), American consultant and businessman, brother of Hillary Clinton
- James Rodham (born 1983), English cricketer
- Morris Rodham, Archdeacon of Warwick in the Diocese of Coventry, England, 2010–2012
- C.H.B. Rodham, commander of the 100th Indian Infantry Brigade in World War II

=== Given name ===
- Rodham Kenner, delegate to the Fifth Virginia Convention in 1776
- Rodham E. Tulloss, specialist in fungus species such as Amanita rubrovolvata

== Literature ==
- Rodham (novel), a 2020 novel by Curtis Sittenfeld

== See also ==
- Rodham, Patel, a parish in Drake County, New South Wales, Australia
- Roddon (also written "rodham"), the dried raised bed of a watercourse in the UK
