= Hugh Rodham =

Hugh Rodham may refer to:

- Hugh Rodham (born 1911) (1911–1993), American businessman, politician and merchant (father of Hillary Clinton)
- Hugh Rodham (born 1950), American lawyer, businessman and politician (brother of Hillary Clinton)
