= United States Attorney for the Middle District of Florida =

Law enforcement position in Florida, US

U.S. Attorney's Office for the Middle District of Florida
Department overview
- Jurisdiction: Middle District of Florida
- Headquarters: Orlando, Florida, U.S.
- Department executive: Gregory Kehoe, U.S. Attorney
- Parent Department: United States Department of Justice
- Website: justice.gov/usao-mdfl

The United States attorney for the Middle District of Florida is responsible for representing the federal government in the United States District Court for the Middle District of Florida. The U.S. attorney for the Middle District of Florida has offices in Fort Myers, Jacksonville, Ocala, Orlando, and Tampa.

Gregory Kehoe is the current acting U.S. attorney, having replaced Roger B. Handberg in 2025. President Joe Biden nominated Handberg to become U.S. attorney for the Middle District of Florida on September 15, 2022, and his nomination was confirmed in the Senate by voice vote on December 6, 2022. Handberg previously served as interim U.S. attorney for the Middle District of Florida and was in charge of the Orlando office.

Prior to Handberg, the U.S. attorney for the Middle District of Florida was Maria Chapa Lopez who was appointed by President Donald Trump.

Formerly the deputy United States attorney for the Middle District of Florida, James Klindt received this position after the resignation of U.S. attorney Paul Perez in March 2007. Perez was appointed to the position in March 2002 by President George W. Bush. Though Perez resigned in the wake of the dismissal of United States attorneys controversy, he stated that his resignation was not related to the ongoing inquiry surrounding United States attorney general Alberto Gonzales.

Charles R. Wilson served as United States attorney for the Middle District of Florida from 1994 until his appointment to the United States Court of Appeals for the Eleventh Circuit in 1999.

== List of former U.S. attorneys ==
- Edward F. Boardman 1961–69
- John L. Briggs 1969–78
- John J. Daley 1978–79
- Gary L. Betz 1979–82
- Robert W. Merkle, Jr. 1982–88
- Robert W. Genzman 1988–93
- Douglas N. Frazier 1993
- Larry H. Colleton 1994
- Donna A. Bucella 1994
- Charles R. Wilson 1994–99
- Donna A. Bucella 1999–2001
- Paul Ignatius Perez 2002?–2007
- James R. Klindt 2007
- Robert E. O'Neill 2007–2008
- A. Brian Albritton 2008–2010
- Robert E. O'Neill 2010–2013
- A. Lee Bentley III 2014–2017
- William S. Muldrow 2017
- Maria Chapa Lopez 2018–2021
- Karin Hoppmann 2021
- Roger B. Handberg 2021–2025
