= Lake Winola, Pennsylvania =

- census-designated place
- Location of Lake Winola within the state of Pennsylvania Lake Winola (the United States)
- Country: United States
- State: Pennsylvania
- County: Wyoming

Area
  - Total: 1.83 sq mi (4.74 km^{2})
  - Land: 1.54 sq mi (3.99 km^{2})
  - Water: 0.29 sq mi (0.75 km^{2})

Population (2020)
  - Total: 597
  - Density: 387.3/sq mi (149.54/km^{2})
- Time zone: UTC-5 (Eastern (EST))
  - Summer (DST): UTC-4 (EDT)
- FIPS code: 42-41080

Lake Winola is a census-designated place located in Overfield Township, Wyoming County, in the state of Pennsylvania. The community is located along Pennsylvania Route 307. As of the 2010 census the population was 748 residents.

== Demographics ==
Historical population
Census	Pop.	Note	%±
2020	597		—
U.S. Decennial Census

== Notable people ==
- Hillary Clinton — former First Lady of the United States, U.S. Secretary of State and U.S. Senator from New York. Her father Hugh E. Rodham was born and lived in nearby Scranton, and Hillary Clinton spent much of her childhood at Lake Winola with her brothers Hugh and Tony.
- Hugh Rodham — lawyer and former Democratic Party politician, brother of Hillary Clinton.
- Tony Rodham — consultant and businessman, brother of Hillary Clinton.
