= Northern Electric Railway =

Northern Electric Railway may refer to:

- Northern Electric Railway (California), a predecessor of the Sacramento Northern Railway, an interurban in northern California
- Scranton, Montrose and Binghamton Railroad, an interurban in northeastern Pennsylvania
