= Buddy MacKay =

American politician (1933–2024)

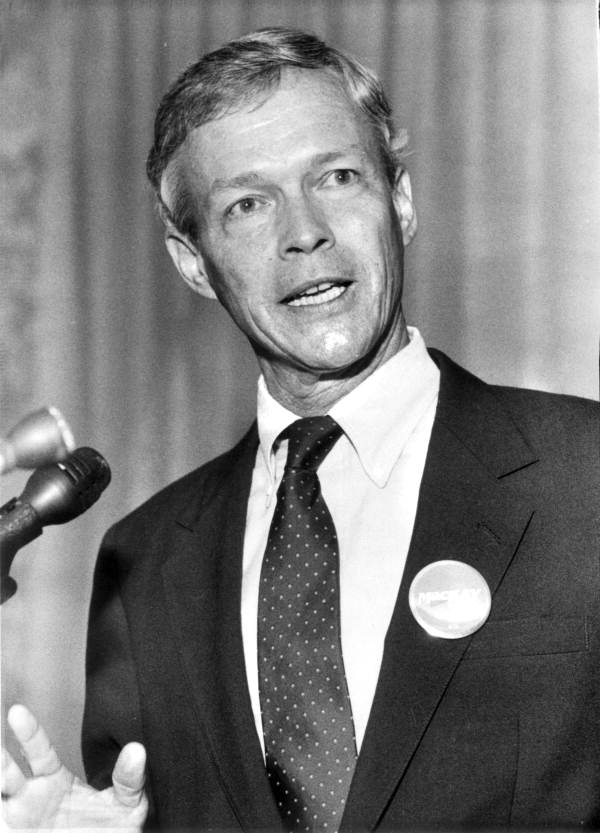
- MacKay in 1988

United States Special Envoy for the Americas
- In office March 5, 1999 – January 20, 2001
- President: Bill Clinton
- Preceded by: Mack McLarty
- Succeeded by: Otto Reich

42nd Governor of Florida
- In office December 12, 1998 – January 5, 1999
- Lieutenant: Vacant
- Preceded by: Lawton Chiles
- Succeeded by: Jeb Bush

14th Lieutenant Governor of Florida
- In office January 8, 1991 – December 12, 1998
- Governor: Lawton Chiles
- Preceded by: Bobby Brantley
- Succeeded by: Frank Brogan

Member of the U.S. House of Representatives from Florida's 6th district
- In office January 3, 1983 – January 3, 1989
- Preceded by: Bill Young
- Succeeded by: Cliff Stearns

Member of the Florida Senate from the 6th district
- In office November 5, 1974 – November 4, 1980
- Preceded by: Jim Williams
- Succeeded by: George Kirkpatrick

Member of the Florida House of Representatives
- In office November 5, 1968 – November 5, 1974
- Preceded by: Bill Chappell
- Succeeded by: Wayne McCall
- Constituency: 30th district (1968–1972); 32nd district (1972–1974)

Personal details
- Born: Kenneth Hood MacKay Jr. March 22, 1933 Ocala, Florida, U.S.
- Died: December 31, 2024 (aged 91) Ocklawaha, Florida, U.S.
- Party: Democratic
- Spouse: Anne Selph (m. 1960)
- Children: 4
- Education: University of Florida (BA, BS, LLB)

Military service
- Branch/service: United States Air Force
- Years of service: 1955–1958
- Rank: Captain

Kenneth Hood "Buddy" MacKay Jr. (March 22, 1933 – December 31, 2024) was an American politician and diplomat who served as the 42nd governor of Florida from December 12, 1998, to January 5, 1999, upon the death of Lawton Chiles. A member of the Democratic Party, he previously served as the 14th lieutenant governor of Florida from 1991 to 1998. During his career, he also served as a state legislator and as a United States representative and special envoy. McKay is to date the last Democratic Governor of Florida, and until his death in 2024, the last living one. (Note: 44th Governor Charlie Crist, a Democrat since 2012, served as a Republican during his term of office (2007-11))

== Early life ==
MacKay was born to a citrus-farming family in Ocala, Florida, the son of Julia Elizabeth (Farnum) and Kenneth Hood MacKay. He served in the United States Air Force during the 1950s, and then attended the University of Florida, where he was tapped into Florida Blue Key and eventually received a law degree. MacKay was inducted into the University of Florida Hall of Fame (the most prestigious honor a student can receive from UF) and was a member of The Board. He married Anne Selph in 1960; the couple has four sons.

== Political career ==
MacKay was elected to the Florida House of Representatives in 1968, and to the Florida Senate in 1974.

In 1980, he ran for U.S. Senate and came third in the Democratic Party primary, therefore failing to qualify for the runoff.

Two years later in 1982, he ran for the U.S. House of Representatives and won. From 1983 to 1989 he served for three terms in the United States House of Representatives.

In 1988 he received the Democratic nomination for the United States Senate, but lost in a very close race for that office to Connie Mack III.

=== Lieutenant governorship ===
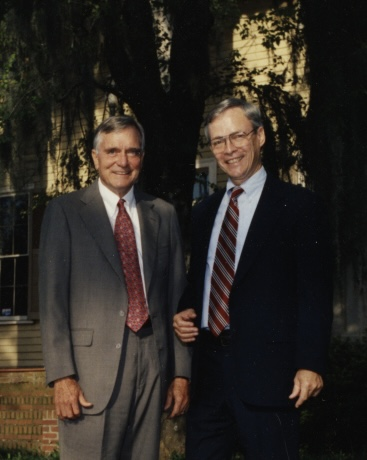
Lawton Chiles and MacKay at the Florida Democratic Party headquarters, 1991

MacKay won the 1990 Democratic primary for lieutenant governor on the ticket headed by former U.S. Senator Lawton Chiles, who had held the Senate seat MacKay had unsuccessfully sought two years earlier. They won the election and were re-elected in 1994, the latter campaign being a close contest against the Republican ticket headed by Jeb Bush.

As lieutenant governor, MacKay was co-chair of the Florida Commission on Education, Reform and Accountability. He was regarded as the most significant and powerful lieutenant governor in Florida's history.

MacKay was a strong supporter of the use of capital punishment, as was Chiles. When he was asked during the 1998 gubernatorial election campaign about his positions on use of the death penalty and electric chair in Florida, he replied: "I support the death penalty and support the use of the electric chair so long as it operates in a reliable fashion." However he suggested that Florida should change its mode of execution after Pedro Medina's botched execution, saying: "The last thing we want to do is generate sympathy for these killers."

=== Gubernatorial campaign ===
In 1998, MacKay sought to succeed the term-limited Chiles as governor, easily winning the Democratic nomination with his full support. However, MacKay secured only 44.7% of the vote, losing to Republican nominee Jeb Bush, who had narrowly lost the 1994 contest but secured 55.3% of the vote in 1998.

=== Governorship ===
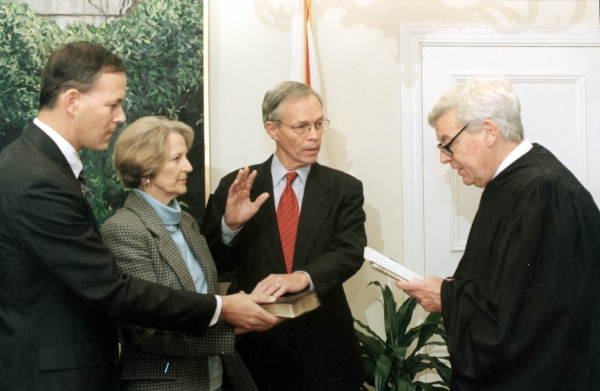
MacKay taking the oath of office, 1998

Despite his defeat, MacKay still became Chiles' successor when Chiles died unexpectedly on December 12, 1998. That day, MacKay was in Boston with his wife. When they returned to their hotel room, they found a message about Chiles' death, asking MacKay to get on a plane to Atlanta, where they were picked up by a state crew and flown through thick fog to Tallahassee. At 12:30 a.m. the next day, the 65-year-old MacKay was sworn in as Florida's 42nd governor at his Capitol office for the 24 days remaining in Chiles' term.

"There's no great pleasure in this," said MacKay about taking a job he had sought, but got for a short time after his political partner's death. He also stated how sorry he was that he would be unable because of the short time and lack of mandate to take care of issues he had long prioritized, such as education and health care.

Despite keeping a low public profile during his time as governor, MacKay made at least 56 appointments to various boards and to various offices, including two judgeships. He granted six pardons to female prisoners and was involved in such issues as the negotiation plan for the Everglades, and moderated some other disputes. Perhaps his most visible act as governor was signing Peggy Quince's nomination to the Florida Supreme Court. Quince was Chiles' last pick for the bench and it fell to MacKay, and then Bush, to sustain her nomination.

Having been defeated in the 1998 election, MacKay was succeeded by Jeb Bush on January 5, 1999.

== Diplomacy ==
MacKay with other officials at the 1999 Summit of the Americas in Miami; L–R: Frank Brogan (FL. lt. gov.), MacKay, Katherine Harris (FL. SOS), Alex Penelas (Miami-Dade mayor), Joe Carollo (Miami mayor), and Luis J. Lauredo

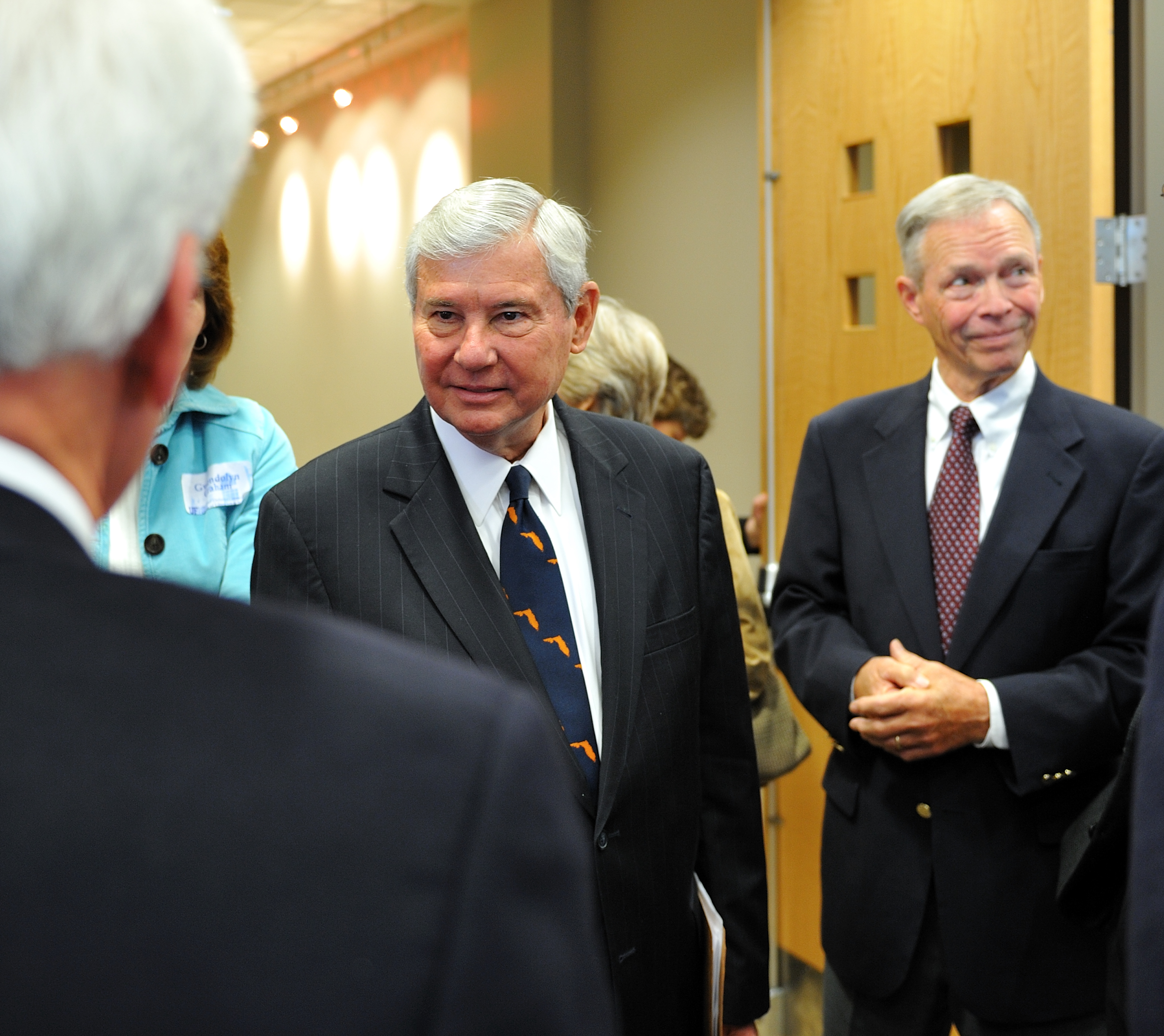
Bob Graham with MacKay, 2008

After his governorship ended, MacKay retired from active politics, but remained publicly active.

MacKay was appointed by President Clinton as a special envoy for the Americas, being the second person to hold this position. During his tenure he traveled to 26 countries in the Americas, working on issues such as the Free Trade Area of the Americas (FTAA), the North American Free Trade Agreement (NAFTA), the Caribbean Basin Initiative (CBI), hemispheric security, strengthening the rule of law, labor standards, environmental policies and human rights.

=== Governors’ forum ===
He attended a “Day with Florida Governors” symposium, organized by the University of Central Florida and Louis Frey Institute on March 27, 2006, with Governor Bush and former governors Claude Roy Kirk Jr., Reubin Askew, Bob Graham and Bob Martinez; Wayne Mixson, who served for three days after Graham's resignation, did not attend.

== Personal life and death ==
MacKay's memoir about his political career, How Florida Happened, was published by the University Press of Florida in March 2010.

MacKay died at his home in Ocklawaha, Florida, on the afternoon of December 31, 2024.

== Electoral history ==
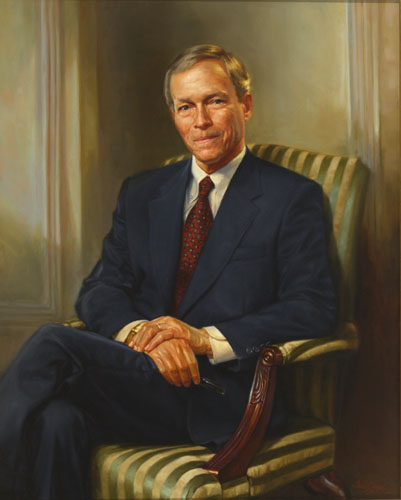
Official portrait, 2001

Florida Senate, 6th district (1974)

- Buddy MacKay (D) – 26,418 (75.32%)
- Charles E. Curtis (R) – 8,655 (24.68%)

Florida Senate, 6th district (1978)

- Buddy MacKay (D, Inc.) – elected unopposed

United States Senate election in Florida, 1980 (Democratic primary)

- Richard Stone (Inc.) – 355,287 (32.08%)
- Bill Gunter – 335,859 (30.33%)
- Buddy MacKay – 272,538 (24.61%)
- Richard A. Pettigrew – 108,154 (9.77%)
- James L. Miller – 18,118 (1.64%)
- John B. Coffey – 17,410 (1.57%)

Florida's 6th congressional district, 1982

- Buddy MacKay (D) – 85,825 (61.35%)
- Ed Havill (R) – 54,059 (38.65%)

Florida's 6th congressional district, 1984

- Buddy MacKay (D, Inc.) – 167,409 (99.30%)
- Eric Tarnley (write-in) – 1,174 (0.70%)

Florida's 6th congressional district, 1986

- Buddy MacKay (D, Inc.) – 143,598 (70.16%)
- Larry Gallagher (R) – 61,069 (29.84%)

United States Senate election in Florida, 1988 (Democratic primary)

- Bill Gunter – 383,721 (38.00%)
- Buddy MacKay – 263,946 (26.14%)
- Dan Mica – 179,524 (17.78%)
- Pat Frank – 119,277 (11.81%)
- Claude Roy Kirk Jr. – 51,387 (5.09%)
- Fred Rader – 11,820 (1.17%)

Florida United States Senate election, 1988 (Democratic runoff)

- Buddy MacKay – 369,266 (52.00%)
- Bill Gunter – 340,918 (48.00%)

Florida United States Senate election, 1988

- Connie Mack III (R) – 2,051,071 (50.42%)
- Buddy MacKay (D) – 2,016,553 (49.57%)
- Adam Straus (write-in) – 585 (0.01%)

Democratic primary for lieutenant governor, 1990

- Buddy MacKay – 746,325 (69.49%)
- Tom Gustafson – 327,731 (30.51%)

Florida gubernatorial election, 1990

- Lawton Chiles/Buddy MacKay (D) – 1,995,206 (56.51%)
- Bob Martinez/J. Allison DeFoor (R) – 1,535,068 (43.48%)

Democratic primary for lieutenant governor, 1994

- Buddy MacKay (Inc.) – 603,657 (72.17%)
- James H. King – 232,757 (27.83%)

Florida gubernatorial election, 1994

- Lawton Chiles/Buddy MacKay (D, Inc.) – 2,135,008 (50.75%)
- Jeb Bush/Tom Feeney (R) – 2,071,068 (49.23%)

Florida gubernatorial election, 1998

- Jeb Bush/Frank Brogan (R) – 2,191,105 (55.27%)
- Buddy MacKay/Rick Dantzler (D) – 1,773,054 (44.72%)

Source: Our Campaigns – Candidate – Kenneth "Buddy" MacKay Jr.

== Notes ==
Florida House of Representatives
Preceded by Bill Chappell	Member of the Florida House of Representatives from the 30th district 1968–1972	Succeeded by Gary Cunningham
Preceded by L. E. Brown	Member of the Florida House of Representatives from the 32nd district 1972–1974	Succeeded by Wayne McCall
Florida Senate
Preceded by Jim Williams	Member of the Florida Senate from the 6th district 1974–1980	Succeeded by George Kirkpatrick
U.S. House of Representatives
Preceded by Bill Young	Member of the U.S. House of Representatives from Florida's 6th congressional district 1983–1989	Succeeded by Cliff Stearns
Party political offices
Preceded by Lawton Chiles	Democratic nominee for U.S. Senator from Florida (Class 1); 1988	Succeeded by Hugh Rodham
Preceded by Franklin B. Mann	Democratic nominee for Lieutenant Governor of Florida; 1990, 1994	Succeeded by Rick Dantzler
Preceded by Lawton Chiles	Democratic Party nominee for Governor of Florida; 1998	Succeeded by Bill McBride
Political offices
Preceded by Bobby Brantley	Lieutenant Governor of Florida; 1991–1998	Succeeded by Frank Brogan
Preceded by Lawton Chiles	Governor of Florida; 1998–1999	Succeeded by Jeb Bush
Diplomatic posts
Preceded by Mack McLarty	United States Special Envoy for the Americas; 1999–2001	Succeeded by Otto Reich
