= Roddam (surname) =

Roddam is a surname. Notable people with the surname include:

- Franc Roddam (born 1946), British film director, businessman, screenwriter, television producer, and publisher
- Robert Roddam (1719–1808), British Royal Navy admiral

== See also ==
- Roddam, Anantapur district, India
- Roddam, Northumberland, England
- Roddon, a dried up old river bed, especially East Anglia
- Roddam Narasimha (1933–2020), Indian aerospace scientist and fluid dynamicist
- Rodham
