= Lake Winola =

Lake in Pennsylvania, United States

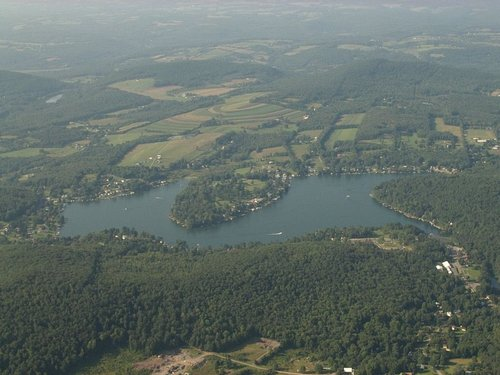

- Location within Pennsylvania Location within the United States
- Location: Overfield Township, PA
- Coordinates: 41°30′45″N 75°50′45″W
- Surface area: 185 acres (0.75 km^{2})
- Max. depth: 69.8 feet (21.3 m)
- Website: lakewinola.org

Lake Winola is a public 185-acre (0.75 km^{2}) glacial lake in Overfield Township, Wyoming County, Pennsylvania, United States. The lake is composed of an eastern and western basin, separated by a peninsula entering the lake from north to south. The lake is managed by the Pennsylvania Fish and Boat Commission and operates a public boat launch located along the southeast corner of the lake. Motorized boats are permitted on the Lake, but are required to navigate counter-clockwise. The Scranton Canoe Club is located on Point Road (peninsula) offering club members a nine-hole golf course and lakeside dining.

== Geography ==
Lake Winola covers 185 acres (0.75 km^{2}) with an average depth of 33.7 feet (10.3 m) and a maximum depth of 69.8 feet (21.3 m) in the center of the western cove. The lake bottom is steeply sloped moving from the shoreline to the open waters and composed of an average 4 feet (1.2 m) of sediment. The thickest amount of sediment (21 feet (6.4 m)) has been deposited in the southeastern section of the lake. The lake bottom also yields eight different types of aquatic vegetation. The dominant species is the Broad-leaved Pondweed while two invasive exotic plant species, the Eurasian Watermilfoil and Curly-leaf Pondweed, are also present.

== History ==
The Scranton, Montrose and Binghamton Railroad, also known as the Northern Electric trolley line, built a branchline from Factoryville to Lake Winola which opened in May, 1908. Following this, Northern Electric purchased 50 acres (0.20 km^{2}) of lakefront property on which a dance pavilion and a small amusement park were built. Summer visitors and residents could also take boat rides on the lake, operated by a small steamboat. Costing just 45 cents one way from the city of Scranton to the lake. This solidified the lake as a popular destination for local residents in the summers for many years. The trolley line operated until the fall of 1930, when it was replaced with bus service which was operated by the Northern Electric since 1927. Through time the dance pavilion, amusement park and steamboat rides were phased out leaving only a few foundations as reminders.

Lake Winola was a childhood vacation spot for Hillary Clinton and her family. In 2013, she released her co-ownership of the family cottage at the lake to her brothers Hugh and Tony.

== Images ==
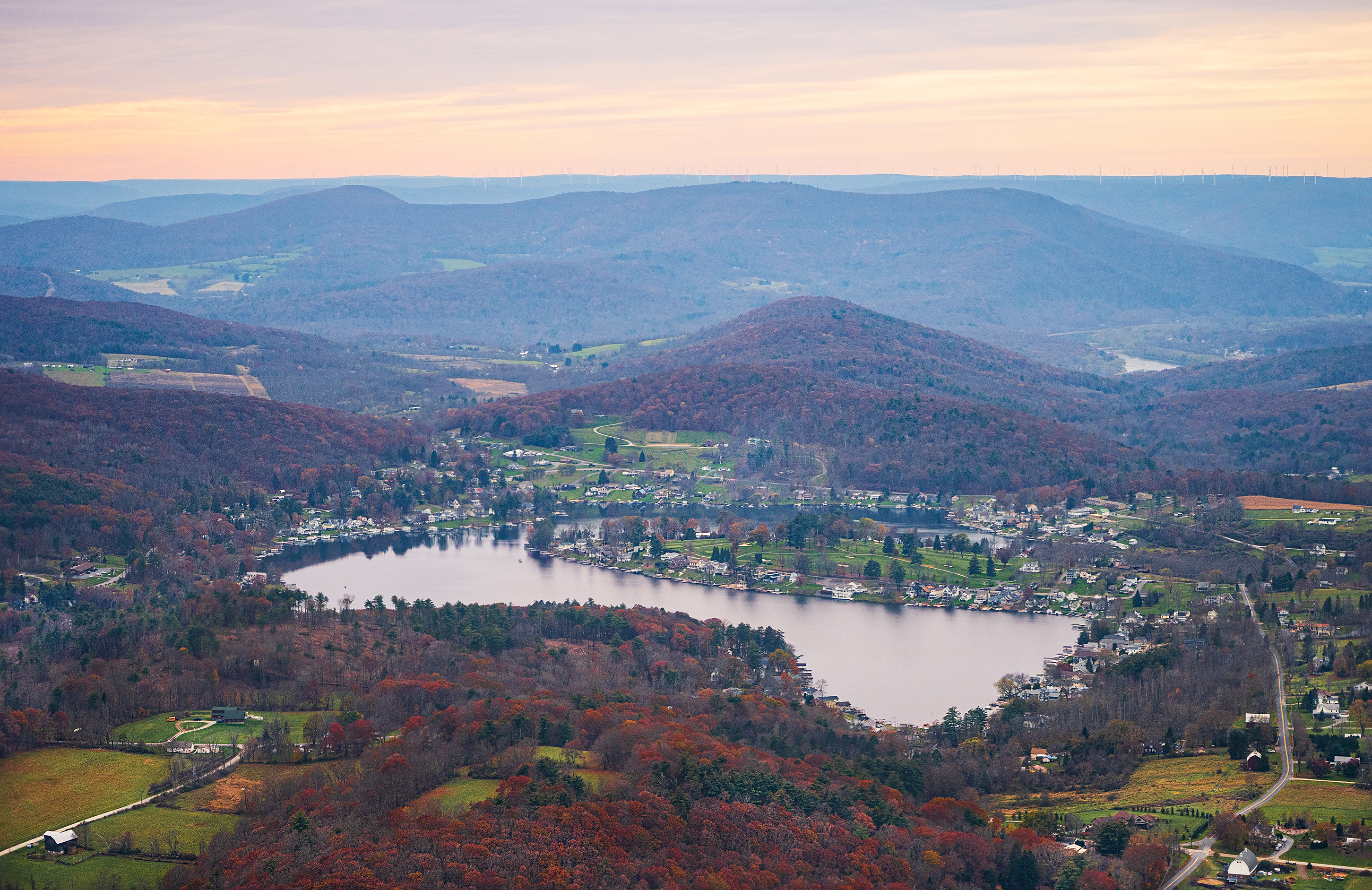
Lake Winola from above

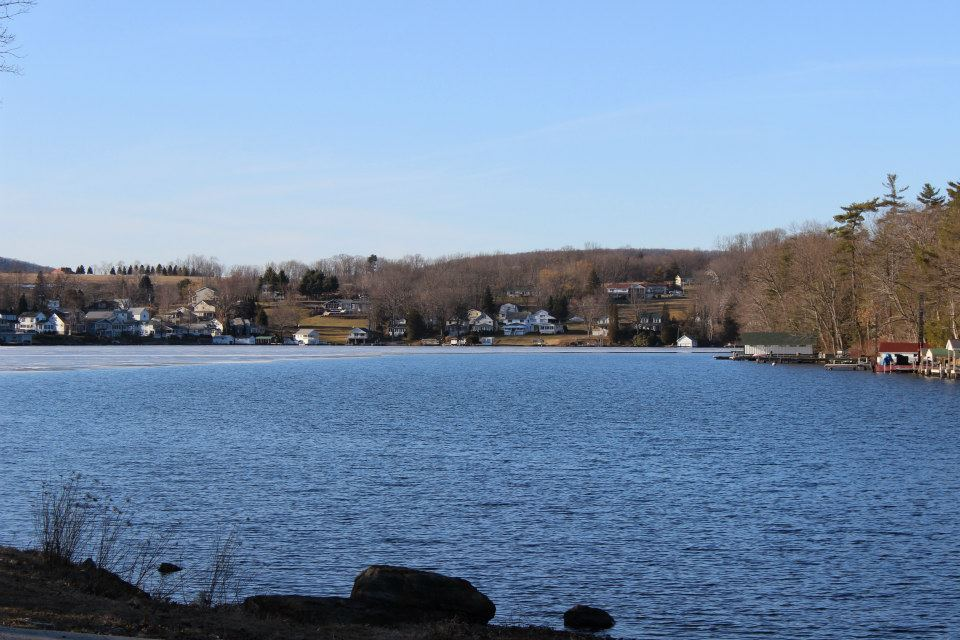
Lake Winola in March

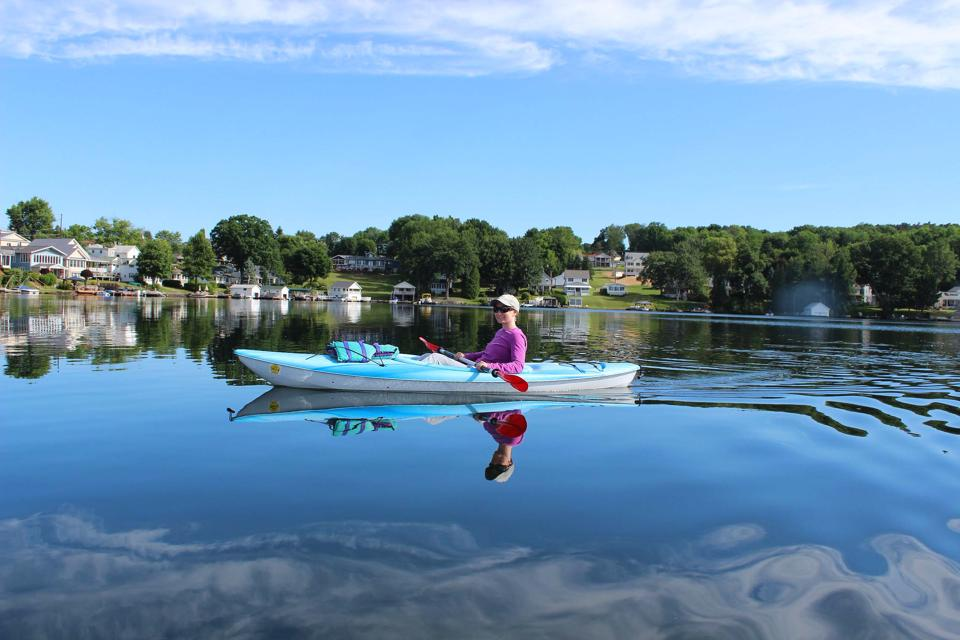
Kayaker on the Lake

== Surrounding communities ==
- Factoryville, PA
- Dalton, PA

== See also ==
- List of lakes in Pennsylvania
