= Almon Glenn Braswell =

Convicted businessman pardoned by Clinton

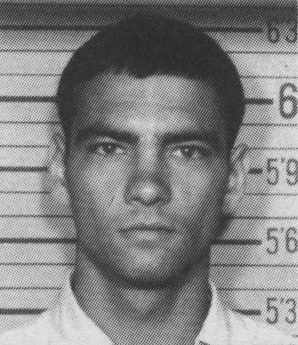
- Photo from Braswell's ID, issued 1965
- Born: March 11, 1943; Albany, Georgia, U.S.
- Died: October 28, 2006 (aged 63); Miami Beach, Florida, U.S.
- Occupation: Business owner
- Criminal charges: Mail fraud, perjury
- Criminal penalty: 3 years in federal prison
- Criminal status: Pardoned
- Spouse: Renee Covington (div. 1999)

Almon Glenn Braswell (March 11, 1943 – October 28, 2006) was a business owner who founded Gero Vita International Inc. He is most noted for being one of the 140 people pardoned in the Bill Clinton pardons controversy of January 2001.

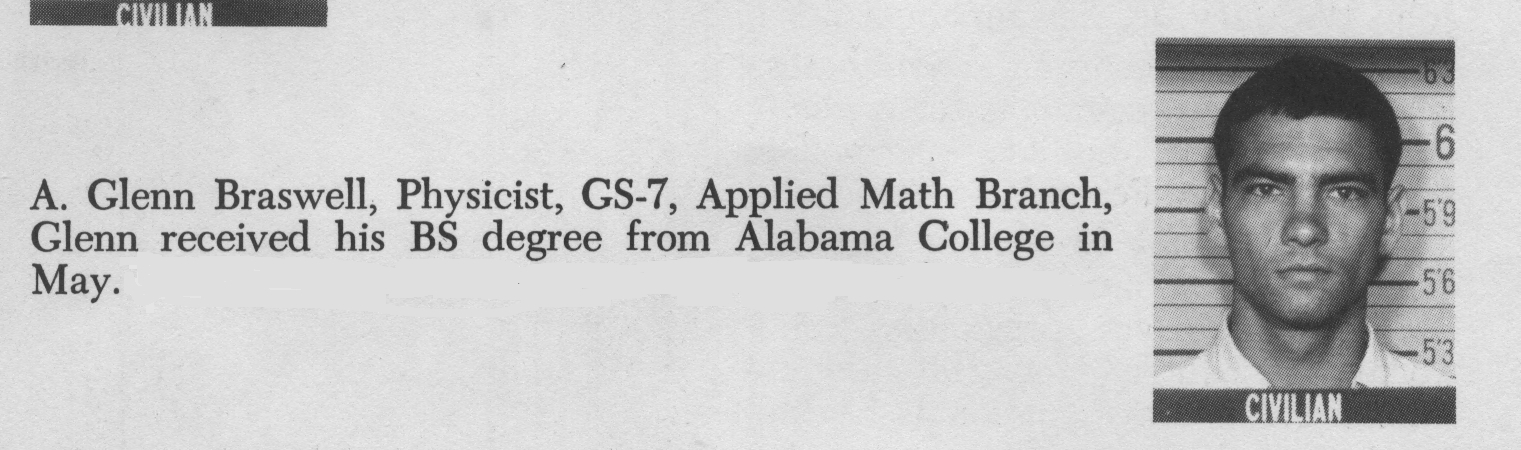
Glenn's Navy hire-in ID photo, published on The Underseer July 16, 1965

== Criminal charges ==
=== Unsubstantiated treatment for baldness ===
In 1983, Braswell was convicted of mail fraud and perjury in relation to false claims about a baldness treatment and sentenced to three years in federal prison. He was later pardoned by President Bill Clinton in January 2001, on Clinton's last day in office. It was later revealed that Clinton's brother-in-law Hugh Rodham had been paid $200,000 by Braswell to lobby for the pardon. Rodham eventually returned the money.

During the 1990s, Braswell operated out of Canada, using the Gero Vita brand.

=== IRS and FTC investigations ===
In 2003, Braswell was arrested again and charged with owing the Internal Revenue Service $10.5 million in taxes. Under a plea agreement, Braswell received an 18-month prison sentence. His company Gero Vita has also been taken to court by the Federal Trade Commission. His activities have been documented for many years by Stephen Barrett of Quackwatch.

== Death ==
Braswell (at age 63) was found dead Saturday, October 28, 2006, in his Miami Beach condominium by his employees.

== See also ==
- List of people pardoned or granted clemency by the president of the United States
