= 1994 United States Senate election in Florida =

- November 8, 1994
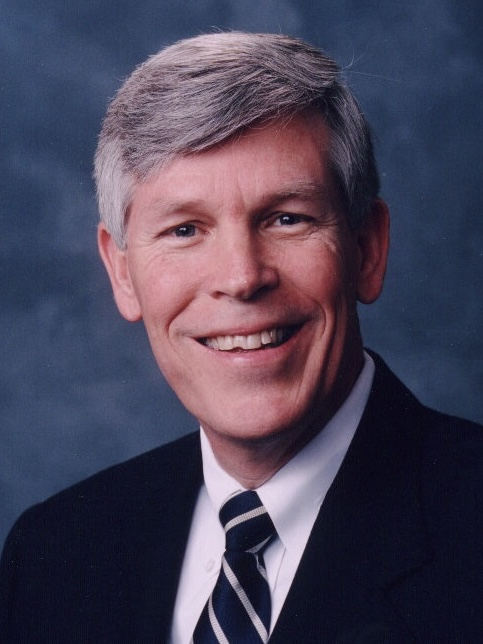

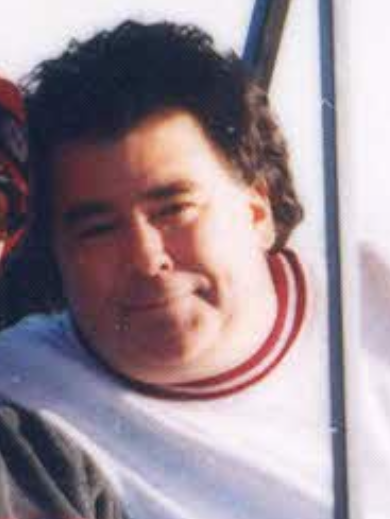
Nominee	Connie Mack III	Hugh Rodham
Party	Republican	Democratic
Popular vote	2,895,200	1,210,577
Percentage	70.50%	29.48%
- Mack: 50–60% 60–70% 70–80% 80–90% >90% Rodham: 50–60% 60–70% 70–80% 80–90% >90% Tie: 50% No votes
U.S. senator before election
Connie Mack III
Republican
Elected U.S. Senator
Connie Mack III
Republican

The 1994 United States Senate election in Florida was held November 8, 1994. Incumbent Republican U.S. Senator Connie Mack III won re-election easily, earning a second term and carrying every county in the state.

With his victory, Mack became the first Republican ever to win reelection to the United States Senate from Florida. As of 2026, this is the last time that a U.S. Senate candidate carried all counties in Florida. This is also the last time that Broward County and Gadsden County have voted Republican in a statewide race. Mack won by 1.7 million votes. This is also the largest raw vote margin for a statewide race in Florida to date in 2026.

== Republican primary ==
=== Candidates ===
- Connie Mack III, incumbent U.S. Senator

=== Results ===
Republican primary results
Party	Candidate	Votes	%
Republican	Connie Mack III (incumbent)	Unopposed	100.0

== Democratic primary ==
=== Candidates ===
- Arturo Perez
- Hugh Rodham, public defender and brother to First Lady Hillary Clinton
- Ellis Rubin, criminal defense attorney
- Mike Wiley, talk radio personality and advocate of UFO conspiracy theories

=== Results ===
Initial primary results by county: Rodham: 20–30%; 30–40%; 40–50%; Wiley: 20–30%; 30–40%; 40–50%; 50–60%; Perez: 30–40%

Primary runoff results by county: Rodham: 50–60%; 60–70%; 70–80%; 80–90%; Wiley: 50–60%; 60–70%; 70–80%

Democratic primary results
Party	Candidate	Votes	%
Democratic	Hugh Rodham	255,605	33.78
Democratic	Mike Wiley	188,551	24.92
Democratic	Ellis Rubin	161,386	21.33
Democratic	A. Perez	151,121	19.97
Total votes		756,663	100

Democratic primary runoff results
Party	Candidate	Votes	%
Democratic	Hugh Rodham	221,424	58.09
Democratic	Mike Wiley	159,776	41.91
Total votes		381,200	100

== General election ==
=== Candidates ===
- Connie Mack III (R), incumbent U.S. Senator
- Hugh Rodham (D), public defender and brother to first lady Hillary Clinton

=== Campaign ===
Rodham left the public defenders office to run for the United States Senate in Florida in 1994. He won the Democratic Party nomination by defeating Mike Wiley in a runoff election, after earlier finishing first in a four-person primary field with 34 percent. After the first primary, the third-place finisher, flamboyant Miami lawyer and perennial losing candidate Ellis Rubin, joined forces with Rodham as a "senior executive consultant" and hatchet man. In the presence of Rodham at a press conference, Rubin levelled the accusation that Wiley was hiding his Jewish faith by changing his name from his birth name, Michael Schreibman, and that Wiley "changed his name before the campaign to deceive voters about his Jewish religion." Wiley accordingly refused to endorse Rodham after the runoff. Rodham then lost by a 70%-30% margin to incumbent Senator Republican Connie Mack III in the general election. Although Bill and Hillary Clinton both campaigned for him, his organization was unable to take advantage of their help, he had few funds, almost no television commercials, and little support from the Florida Democratic party establishment in a year that saw Republican gains everywhere. After the election, Rubin switched allegiance again and charged Rodham with election law violations in the first primary; the Federal Election Commission eventually dismissed the allegations.

=== Results ===
General election results
Party	Candidate	Votes	%	±%
Republican	Connie Mack III (incumbent)	2,895,200	70.50	+20.10
Democratic	Hugh Rodham	1,210,577	29.48	−20.12
Write-in		1,039	0.02	
Majority		1,684,623	41.02	+40.22
Total votes		4,106,816	100.00	
Republican hold		Swing		

== See also ==
- 1994 United States Senate elections
