= A. Lee Bentley III =

American lawyer (born 1959)

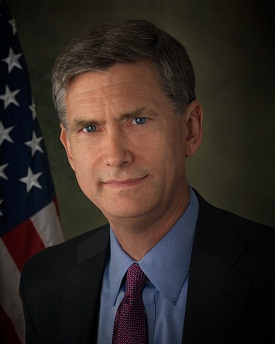

United States Attorney for the Middle District of Florida
- In office December 16, 2014 – March 10, 2017
- President: Barack Obama; Donald Trump
- Preceded by: Robert E. O'Neill
- Succeeded by: Maria Chapa Lopez

Personal details
- Born: Arthur Lee Bentley III; January 26, 1959 (age 67) Tuscaloosa, Alabama, U.S.
- Education: University of Georgia (BBA); University of Virginia (JD)

Arthur Lee Bentley III (born January 26, 1959) is an American lawyer who was the United States Attorney for the Middle District of Florida from 2014 until 2017. In January 2018, he joined Bradley Arant Boult Cummings LLP, a law firm which has an office based in Tampa, Florida.

== Early life and education ==
Bentley was born in Tuscaloosa, Alabama. He graduated from the University of Georgia and earned his Juris Doctor degree in 1983 from the University of Virginia School of Law, where he was a member of the Order of the Coif and an editor of the Virginia Law Review.

== Career ==
Following law school, Bentley clerked for Supreme Court Justice Lewis F. Powell Jr. in the 1984 Term, and for U.S. Court of Appeals for the Fourth Circuit Chief Judge Clement Haynsworth.

Prior to joining the U.S. Attorney's Office in 2000, Bentley spent ten years in private practice with Hogan & Hartson in Washington, D.C. and was Special Assistant U.S. Attorney in the U.S. District Court for the Southern District of Florida, an Attorney-Advisor in the Office of Legal Counsel with the U.S. Department of Justice.

=== United States Attorney's Office ===
In 2000, Bentley joined the U.S. Attorney's Office for the Middle District of Florida. In July 2013 when U.S. Attorney Robert E. O'Neill resigned to take a position in the private sector with the Freeh Group, Bentley became the Acting U.S. Attorney for the Middle District of Florida. He was formally nominated by President Barack Obama in June 2014 on the bi-partisan recommendation of Florida's U.S. Senators, Republican Marco Rubio and Democrat Bill Nelson. Bentley was unanimously confirmed by the U.S. Senate on December 16, 2014.

In July 2016, Bentley's office charged Democratic Congresswoman Corrine Brown of Florida with 24 counts of federal corruption, accusing Brown and her Chief of Staff Ronnie Simmons of using Brown's position in Congress to solicit more than $800,000 for what federal prosecutors call a "sham education charity." In February 2017, Simmons pleaded guilty to federal charges and agreed to testify against Brown at her upcoming trial.

== See also ==
- 2017 dismissal of U.S. attorneys
- List of law clerks for the first seat of the Supreme Court of the United States
