= Roger B. Handberg =

American lawyer

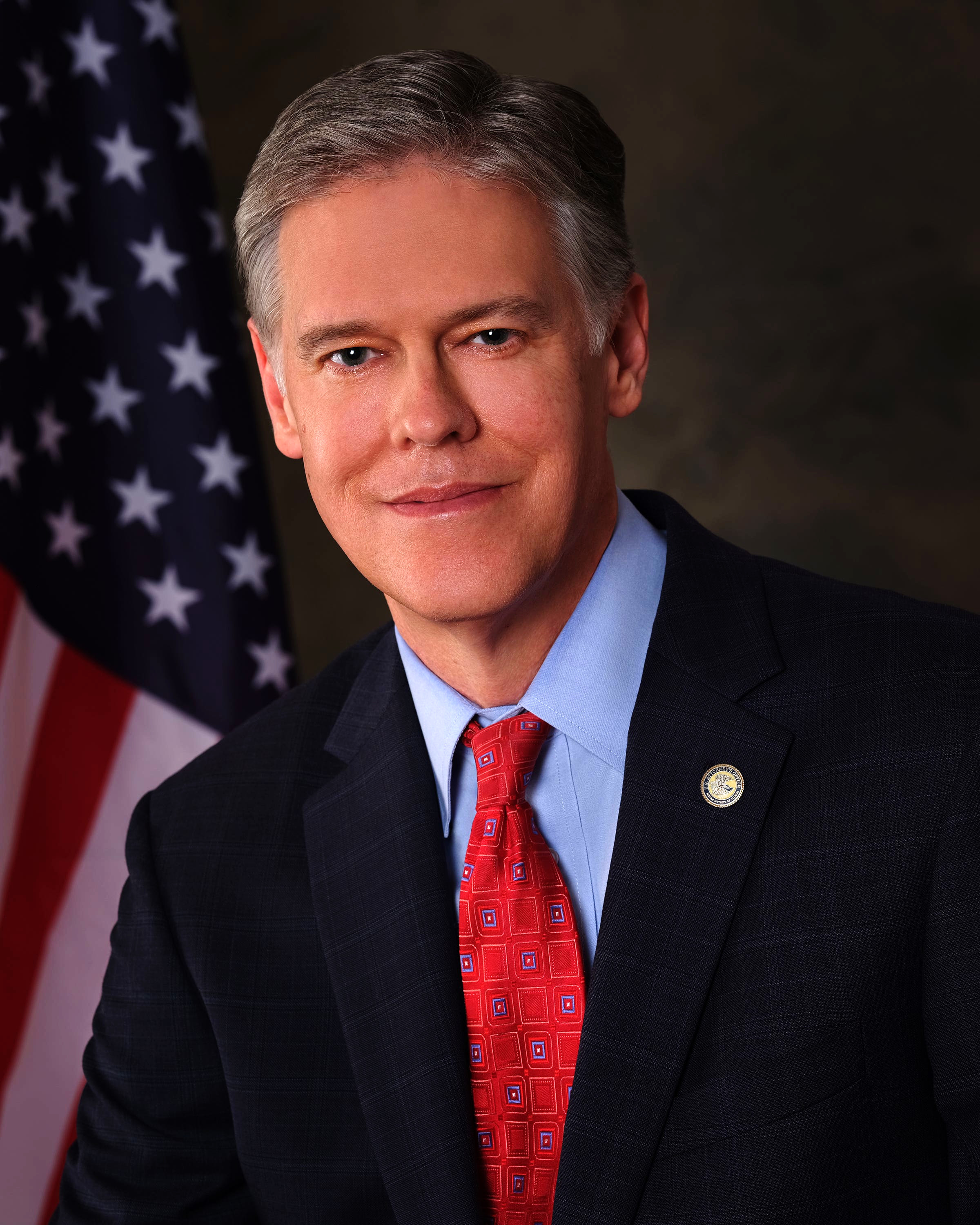

United States Attorney for the Middle District of Florida
- In office December 25, 2021 – February 18, 2025 (Interim: December 25, 2021 – December 8, 2022)
- President: Joe Biden; Donald Trump
- Preceded by: Maria Chapa Lopez
- Succeeded by: Sara C. Sweeney (acting)

Personal details
- Education: University of North Carolina at Chapel Hill (BA); Harvard University (JD)

Roger Bernard Handberg III is an American lawyer who served as the United States attorney for the Middle District of Florida from 2021 to 2025.

== Education ==
Handberg earned a Bachelor of Arts from the University of North Carolina at Chapel Hill in 1991 and a Juris Doctor from Harvard Law School in 1994.

== Career ==
From 1994 to 1999, Handberg worked as an associate at King & Spalding in Atlanta. From 1999 to 2002, he served as a senior assistant attorney general in the Florida Attorney General's Office. Handberg served as an assistant United States attorney for the Middle District of Florida from 2002 to 2021.

=== U.S. attorney ===
Handberg was appointed interim United States attorney by Attorney General Merrick Garland, effective December 25, 2021. On September 15, 2022, President Joe Biden nominated Handberg to be the United States attorney for the Middle District of Florida. On December 1, 2022, his nomination was reported out of the Senate Judiciary Committee by voice vote. On December 6, 2022, his nomination was confirmed in the Senate by voice vote. Handberg was fired as the United States attorney and left office on February 18, 2025.
