= Robert Merkle =

American attorney (1944–2003)

United States Attorney for the Middle District of Florida
- In office 1982–1988
- Preceded by: Gary L. Betz
- Succeeded by: Robert W. Genzman

Personal details
- Born: Robert W. Merkle Jr. 1944
- Died: 2003 (aged 58–59)
- Party: Republican
- Spouse: Angela
- Children: 9
- Education: St. Leo Preparatory School
- Occupation: Attorney

Robert W. Merkle, Jr. (1944–2003) was an American attorney who served as U.S. Attorney in the Middle District of Florida from 1982 to 1988. He also ran for governor of Florida and in the Republican primary for a U.S. Senate seat. He prosecuted drug lords, politicians, and judges.

== Early life ==
Merkle went to St. Leo Preparatory School outside Tampa where he was an accomplished athlete. He received a football scholarship to Notre Dame where he played fullback during his junior year before being sidelined by injuries his senior year.

== Career ==
He worked as a prosecutor for the Justice Department and as an assistant state attorney in the Pasco-Pinellas county circuit before being appointed U.S. attorney in April 1982. He was an outspoken opponent of abortion.

He lost to Connie Mack III in the Republican Primary for the 1988 United States Senate election in Florida.

He was U.S. Attorney for the Middle District of Florida.

== Personal life ==
Merkle was Catholic. He and his wife, Angela, had nine children.

Legal offices
Preceded by Gary L. Betz	United States Attorney for the Middle District of Florida; 1982–1988	Succeeded by Robert W. Genzman
