= Wayne McCall =

American politician

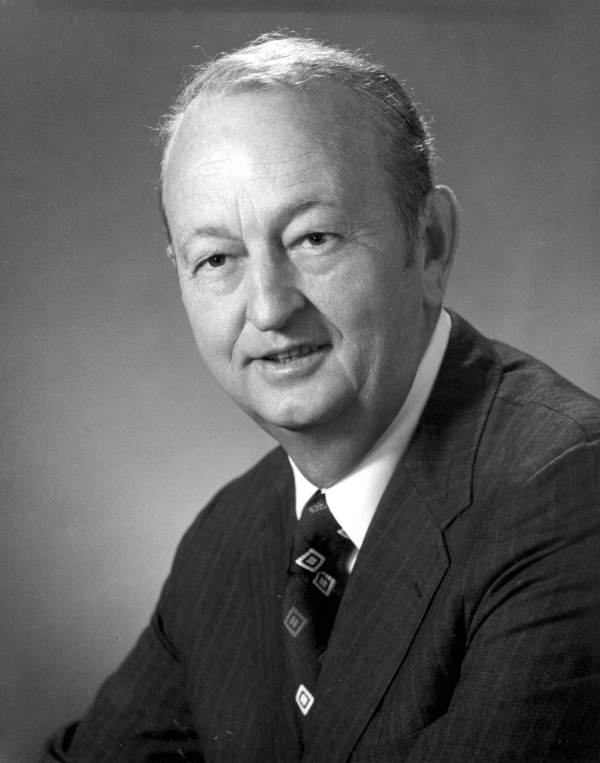
- McCall in 1974

Member of the Florida House of Representatives from the 32nd district
- In office 1974–1980
- Preceded by: Buddy MacKay
- Succeeded by: Chris Meffert

Personal details
- Born: October 16, 1918 Panama City, Florida, U.S.
- Died: April 11, 1980 (aged 61)
- Party: Democratic
- Education: College of South Georgia; University of Florida; Emory University

Wayne C. McCall (October 16, 1918 – April 11, 1980) was an American politician. He served as a Democratic member for the 32nd district of the Florida House of Representatives.

== Life and career ==
McCall was born in Panama City, Florida. He attended the College of South Georgia, the University of Florida and Emory University.

In 1974, McCall was elected to represent the 32nd district of the Florida House of Representatives, succeeding Buddy MacKay. He served until 1980, when he was succeeded by Chris Meffert.

McCall died on April 11, 1980, at the age of 61.
