= Connie Mack III =

American politician (born 1940)

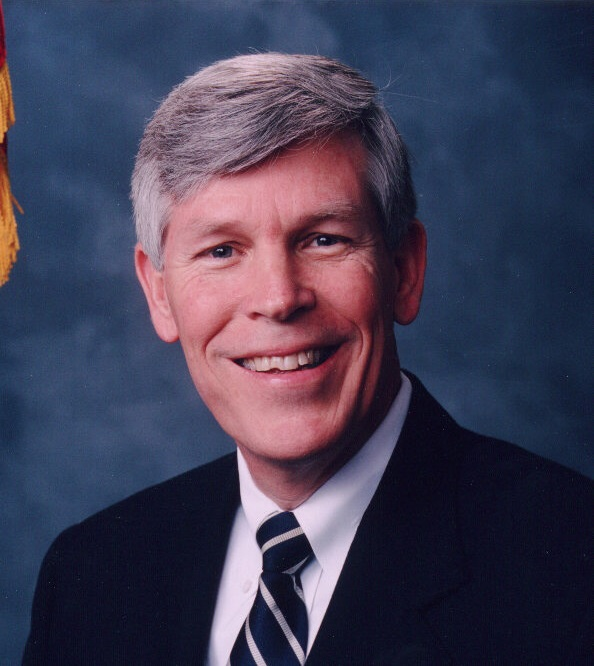

United States Senator from Florida
- In office January 3, 1989 – January 3, 2001
- Preceded by: Lawton Chiles
- Succeeded by: Bill Nelson

Member of the U.S. House of Representatives from Florida's 13th district
- In office January 3, 1983 – January 3, 1989
- Preceded by: William Lehman
- Succeeded by: Porter Goss

Personal details
- Born: Cornelius Alexander McGillicuddy III; October 29, 1940 (age 85) Philadelphia, Pennsylvania, U.S.
- Party: Republican
- Spouse: Ludie Hobbs
- Children: Connie Mack IV
- Relatives: Connie Mack (grandfather); Morris Sheppard (grandfather); Tom Connally (step-grandfather); Earle Mack (paternal uncle); Roy Mack (paternal uncle)
- Education: University of Florida (BBA)

Cornelius Alexander McGillicuddy III (born October 29, 1940), also known as Connie Mack III, is an American politician who served as a member of the United States House of Representatives from Florida's 13th congressional district from 1983 to 1989 and then as a United States Senator from 1989 to 2001. He served as chairman of the Senate Republican Conference from 1997 to 2001.

He was twice considered for the Republican vice-presidential nomination by Bob Dole in 1996 and George W. Bush in 2000. He is the grandson of Connie Mack (1862–1956), former owner and manager of baseball's Philadelphia Athletics and a member of the Baseball Hall of Fame. "The Macks" were once considered one of the major political dynasties in the United States.

== Early life, education, and family ==
Mack was born Cornelius Alexander McGillicuddy III in Philadelphia, Pennsylvania in 1940, the son of Cornelius Alexander McGillicuddy Jr. and Susan (née Sheppard) McGillicuddy. He graduated from the University of Florida with a BBA in 1966. He is a member of the Sigma Alpha Epsilon fraternity and Florida Blue Key.

His paternal grandfather was Connie Mack (1862–1956), former owner and manager of baseball's Philadelphia Athletics and member of the Baseball Hall of Fame. Mack's maternal grandfather was Morris Sheppard, U.S. Senator and Representative from Texas. His maternal step-grandfather was Tom Connally, who also served as U.S. Senator from Texas; Mack's widowed grandmother married Connally the year after Sheppard died. Mack's father's line were Irish immigrants. Mack's maternal great-grandfather was John Levi Sheppard, who served as a U.S. Representative from Texas.

== Congressional career ==
=== Elections ===
==== U.S. House elections ====
Mack made his first run for public office in 1982, when he ran in the Republican primary for the 13th district, a newly created district along the Gulf Coast that stretched from Sarasota to Naples. The old 13th, represented by Democrat William Lehman, had been renumbered as the 17th district. Mack led the field in a crowded four-way Republican primary with 28 percent of the vote and won a run-off election in October against State Representative Ted Ewing 58% to 42%. In the November general election, he won with 65% of the vote. In 1984, he won re-election unopposed and in 1986 won with 75% of the vote.

==== 1988 U.S. Senate election ====
Incumbent Democratic U.S. Senator Lawton Chiles decided to retire. After three terms in the U.S. House, Mack decided to run for the U.S. Senate. He won the primary with 62% of the vote against Robert Merkle. In the general election, he defeated Democratic U.S. Congressman Buddy MacKay with just 50% of the vote.

==== 1994 U.S. Senate election ====
In the general election, Mack defeated Democratic attorney Hugh Rodham (brother of Hillary Clinton) 71% to 29%, winning every county in the state. He was the only Republican Senator in Florida history to be elected to more than one term until Marco Rubio did so in 2016.

=== Tenure ===
During his congressional career, Mack supported the passage of laws dealing with health care, fiscal policies, modification of the tax code, and public housing reform. A cancer survivor, Mack has also been a strong advocate for cancer research, early detection and treatment. Mack led a bipartisan congressional effort to double funding for biomedical research through the National Institutes of Health and worked to secure the necessary appropriations. He also secured Medicare coverage for clinical trials and was a leading Republican advocate of the Women's Health Initiative. He worked to strengthen and reform the Food and Drug Administration.

Mack retired in 2000. Democrat Bill Nelson, the Florida State Treasurer and a former U.S. Representative, won the open seat. Mack's son, U.S. Congressman Connie Mack IV, ran unsuccessfully against Nelson in 2012.

== Awards ==
- 1999, he received the National Coalition for Cancer Research Lifetime Achievement Award.
- 1992, he received the American Cancer Society's Courage Award and the Susan G. Komen Breast Cancer Foundation's Betty Ford Award.

== Post-congressional career ==
In 2005, Connie Mack III was appointed by President George W. Bush as Chairman of the President's Advisory Panel for Federal Tax Reform. Since early 2007, Mack has served as the Senior Policy Advisor to Liberty Partners of Tallahassee, a Florida-based lobbying firm.

On April 15, 2010, Mack resigned as campaign chairman for Charlie Crist's race for the U.S. Senate.

== Representation in other media ==
- In 2005, Mack was featured in Castles in the Sun, a documentary about the development of Cape Coral. His father Connie Mack, Jr. had worked as a public relations man for Leonard and Jack Rosen, the brothers who developed Cape Coral as a waterfront resort. The producer interviewed Connie Mack III at his Palm Island, Florida home.

U.S. House of Representatives
Preceded by William Lehman	Member of the U.S. House of Representatives from Florida's 13th congressional district 1983–1989	Succeeded by Porter Goss
U.S. Senate
Preceded by Lawton Chiles	U.S. Senator (Class 1) from Florida; 1989–2001; Served alongside: Bob Graham	Succeeded by Bill Nelson
Party political offices
Preceded by Trent Lott	Vice Chair of the Senate Republican Conference; 1995–1997	Succeeded by Paul Coverdell
Preceded by Thad Cochran	Chair of the Senate Republican Conference; 1997–2001	Succeeded by Rick Santorum
Preceded by Van Poole	Republican nominee for U.S. Senator from Florida (Class 1); 1988, 1994	Succeeded by Bill McCollum
U.S. order of precedence (ceremonial)
Preceded by Mark Pryor as Former U.S. Senator	Order of precedence of the United States as Former U.S. Senator	Succeeded by Bob Kasten as Former U.S. Senator
