= Scranton, Montrose and Binghamton Railroad =

Overview
- Other name: Northern Electric
- Status: partially abandoned, part rail-trail
- Locale: Lackawanna County, Pennsylvania, Wyoming County, Pennsylvania, Susquehanna County, Pennsylvania
- Termini: Scranton, Pennsylvania; Montrose, Pennsylvania
- Stations: Scranton, Chinchilla, Clarks Summit, Dalton, Factoryville, Nicholson, Hop Bottom (Foster), Brooklyn, Montrose; Lake Winola

Service
- Type: Electric railway
- System: overhead wire
- Depot(s): 227 Wyoming Ave, Scranton, PA, or Dalton, Chinchilla, PA
- Rolling stock: 45-foot cars from J.G. Brill
- Ridership: 1915: 2,222,872

History
- Opened: July 1, 1907
- Closed: September 21, 1932

Technical
- Line length: 49.00 mi (78.86 km)
- Track gauge: 4 ft 8 1/2 in (1,435 mm) standard gauge
- Electrification: Brookside Power Plant, La Plume, PA
- Operating speed: scheduled average 30 mph (48 km/h), maximum 60 mph (97 km/h)

The Scranton, Montrose and Binghamton Railroad Company was an interurban railway, commonly referred to as the Northern Electric railway, which ran between downtown Scranton, Pennsylvania, and its suburbs to the northwest, including Clarks Summit, Dalton, Factoryville and Montrose.

== History ==
=== Formation ===
Incorporated on January 20, 1904, to succeed the Dalton Street Railway, actual construction began in Scranton on West Market Street in mid-March 1906. The approach was to incrementally build northward from Scranton to Binghamton, with the initial stretch ending in Dalton.

Except for poles and power lines, the infrastructure work was largely completed a year later. After the 45-foot trolley cars from the Brill Company arrived and the power house started generating power, the first revenue car left Dalton at 5:00AM on July 1, 1907, and arrived at the terminal on Linden St. in Scranton shortly before 6:00AM. Service continued that year at 40-minute intervals in each direction. By the end of 1907, service was extended to Factoryville soon after the viaduct over the Delaware, Lackawanna and Western Railroad (DL&W) in La Plume was installed. A highly anticipated branch to Lake Winola, built by Italian-Americans, opened Memorial Day in 1908. On April 1, 1912, the Scranton terminal moved from Linden St. to the Eagles lodge building on Wyoming Ave. During the summer of 1912, the trolley line reached Nicholson. Service commenced to Foster (also called Hop Bottom) on July 6, 1915. The final leg to Montrose was opened on August 16, 1915. The company intended to complete the line all the way to Binghamton, but those plans never materialized. Competition, primarily from increasing car and truck traffic on newly built highways, dashed that prospect.

=== Operations ===
Like other interurbans throughout the country, its heyday was in the 1910s. Passenger and freight service ran from the depot on Wyoming Ave. in Scranton, from 6:00AM until 11:00PM, every 30 minutes. Service to Lake Winola was run every 60 minutes, starting at 6:30AM, with the last return trip to Scranton leaving the lake at 10:05PM. The trip from downtown Scranton always began on the Scranton Railway line on Providence Road and N. Main Ave. until the trolleys reached Providence Square (the intersection of N. Main Ave. and West Market St.) At that point they traversed Northern Electric tracks up West Market St. to the city line. Beyond that point, it used its own private right-of-way. Electric power for the line was generated at the Brookside power plant in La Plume, near Dalton, with substations at Chinchilla and Foster. A large car barn was built next to the power plant in La Plume, and a smaller one near the substation in Chinchilla. It built two trolley parks with pavilions, roller coasters and carousels; one was in Clarks Summit, the other at Lake Winola.

=== Decline ===
Soon after the DL&W Railroad completed the Pennsylvania Cutoff in 1915 to streamline its operations, it abandoned its old route between Clarks Summit and Hallstead. It then gave the roadbed to the Commonwealth of Pennsylvania for the express purpose of building a new highway. The road, called the Lackawanna Trail, was completed in June 1922 (it is today's US Route 11 between Clarks Summit and Great Bend). Since this new highway largely paralleled the route of the Northern Electric, it almost immediately began to siphon passenger and local freight traffic from the trolley line.

A plan was developed to extend operations using buses in 1926. In May 1927, the company got approval for and started a small bus operation from Scranton through the Abingtons and Lake Winola to Tunkhannock, but kept the trolleys running the bulk of the operation. Scranton Mayor Jermyn threatened to shut down its trolley operation in the city several times in 1928 and 1929 due to its negligence in maintaining the tracks on West Market St.

By 1930, the effects of declining ridership and the Great Depression came to a head. The trolley line was cut back from Montrose, at first to Nicholson, and then to Factoryville. The Lake Winola trolleys were completely discontinued in October, 1930, but the bus line continued to serve the area. The Brookside power plant was also sold that year to the Abington Power Company for much needed cash. By November 1930, the railroad entered receivership due to decreasing revenues, increasing maintenance costs and incompetent management.

Company officials then wanted to proceed with the plan to completely replace the trolleys with buses, but it was not given license to operate the route (it went to Frank Martz Coach Company instead). Trustees planned to end operations on the line in June, 1931, and to scrap the line by October, 1931. Operations were actually suspended on July 20, 1931. The bus line stopped operating several days earlier, its buses having been repossessed by the Mack Truck Co.

Before it was to be scrapped, a group of employees intervened and formed a cooperative to operate the line between Scranton and Factoryville. They began operations in mid-December 1931.

=== Abandonment ===
The City of Scranton and Commonwealth of Pennsylvania decided to begin extensive construction improvements on West Market St. to the city line in Leggett's Gap (also referred to as the Notch) in 1932. The city council insisted that the Northern Electric pay for the cost of realigning its tracks along the road, which was to be widened through the Notch. The railway cooperative could not afford the reconstruction costs and therefore could not comply.

Scranton city officials then proceeded to tear up the rails and effectively blocked its trolleys from crossing the city line at Leggett's Gap on September 20, 1932. At 7:00PM the next day, the last trolley ran from the city line to Factoryville, abruptly and permanently ending 25 years of operation. Final liquidation of its assets occurred at the end of April, 1935. The little money that came from the sale of the assets went primarily to lawyers. Miners National Bank of Wilkes-Barre was left holding a $1,800,000 mortgage on which it never did or could foreclose.

=== Legacy ===
The Pennsylvania Department of Conservation and Natural Resources provided a $566,000 grant in 2011 to restore sections of the route as walking trails. The first 2.64 mile stretch from Clarks Summit to Dalton was opened on October 10, 2014. A second, 1.7-mile segment from LaPlume to Factoryville was opened in August 2017.

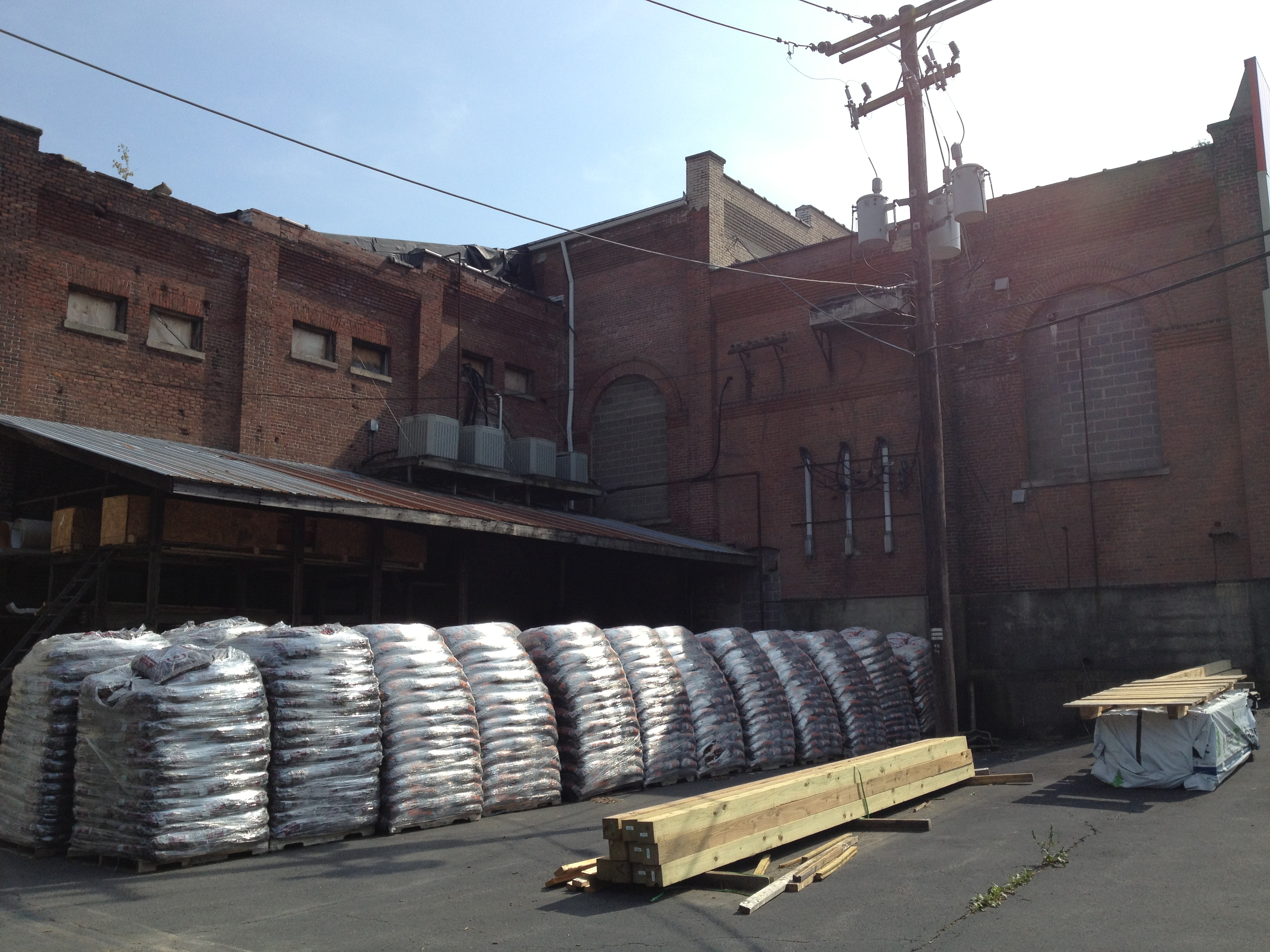
Brookside Power plant in 2013, now a do it yourself center

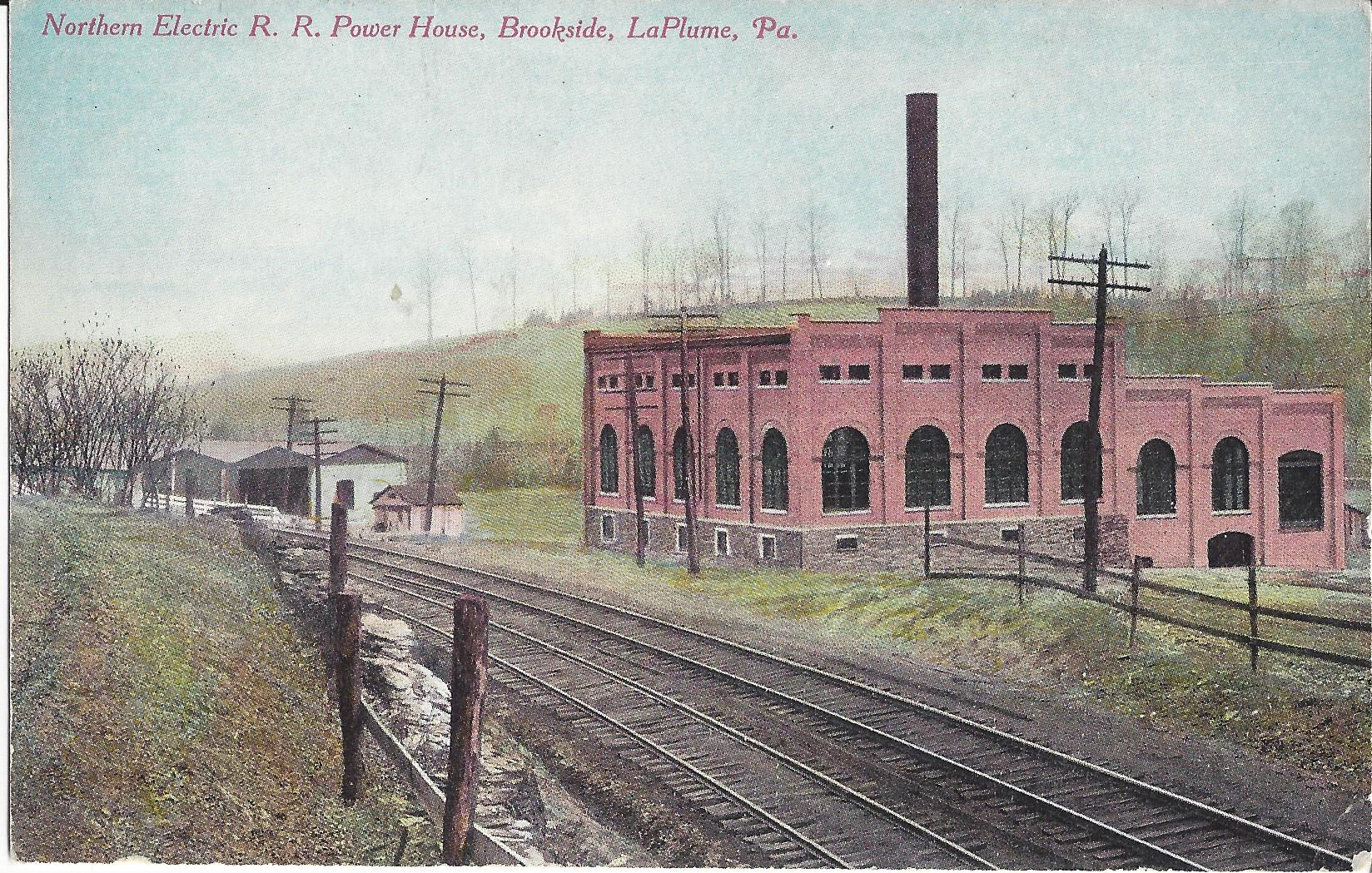
Northern Electric Railway Brookside Power Plant, LaPlume, PA, 1908

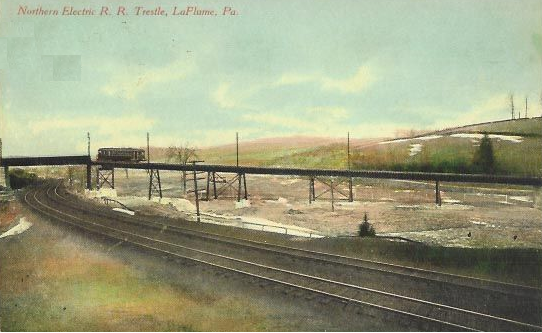
Northern Electric Bridge over DL&W RR in LaPlume, PA 1908

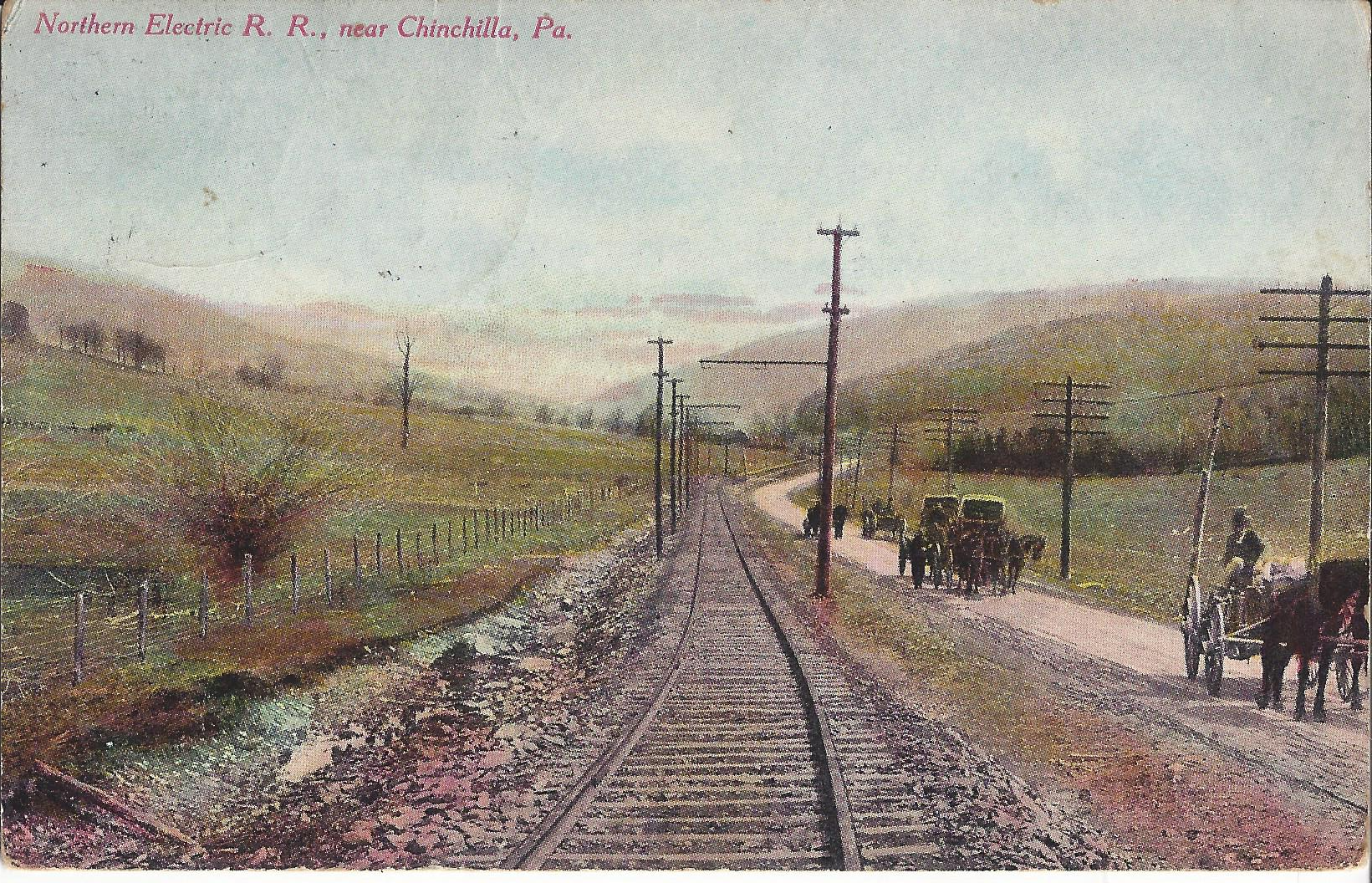
Northern Electric Railway line through Chinchilla, PA, looking east, 1908

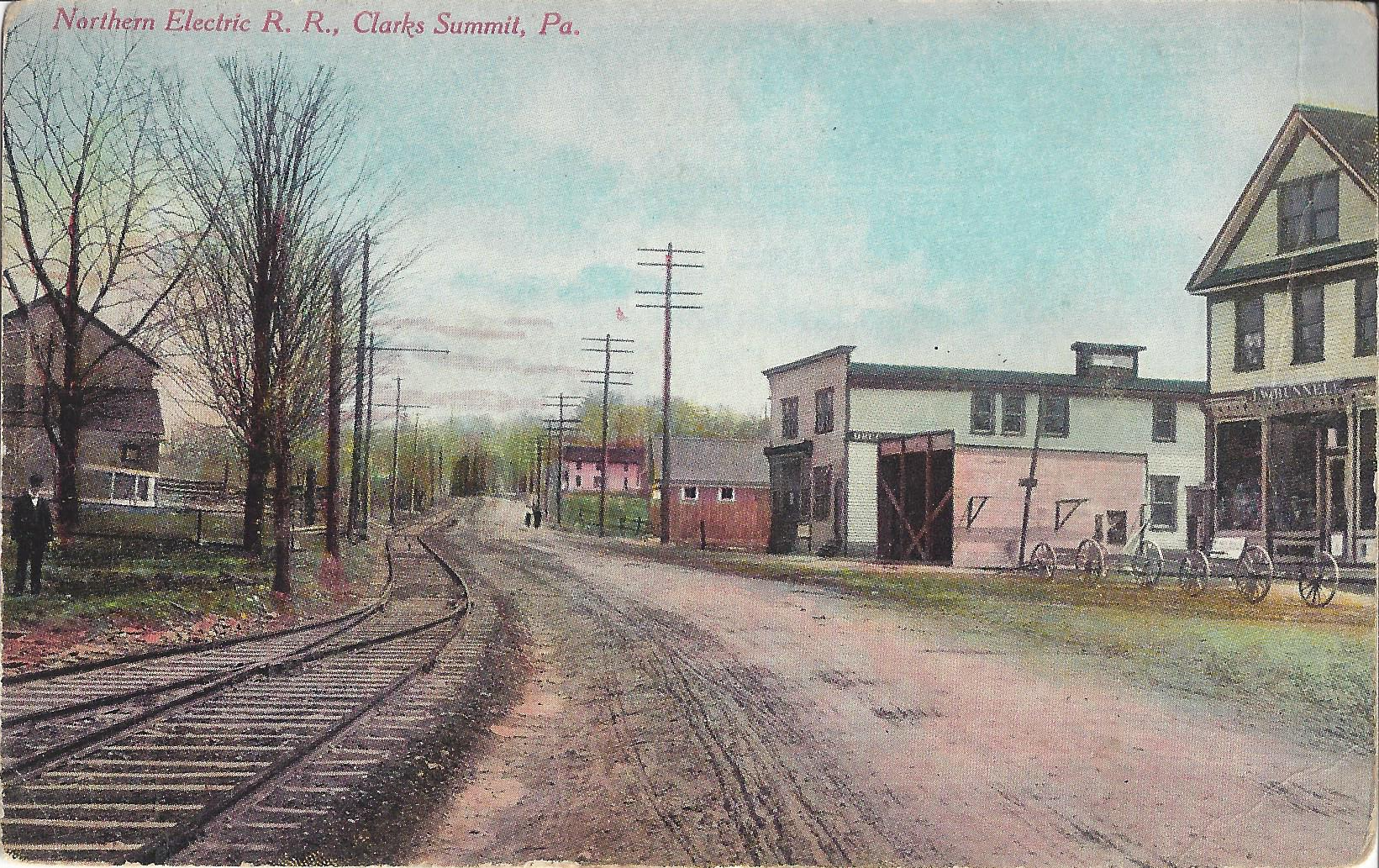
Northern Electric, Clarks Summit, PA, in 1908
