= Overfield Township, Pennsylvania =

Township in Pennsylvania, US

Overfield Township
- Township
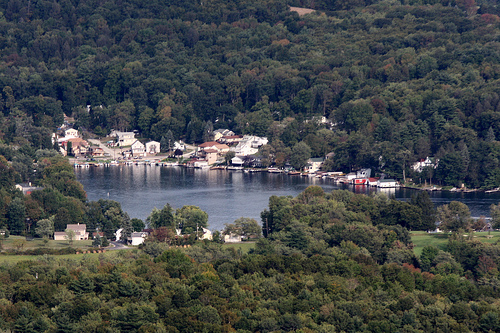
- Aerial view of Lake Winola

- Location of Pennsylvania in the United States
- Coordinates: 41°31′00″N 75°49′59″W
- Country: United States
- State: Pennsylvania
- County: Wyoming

Area
  - Total: 10.26 sq mi (26.58 km^{2})
  - Land: 9.94 sq mi (25.74 km^{2})
  - Water: 0.32 sq mi (0.84 km^{2})
- Elevation: 1,283 ft (391 m)

Population (2020)
  - Total: 1,427 ▼
  - Estimate (2021): 1,435
  - Density: 162.5/sq mi (62.74/km^{2})
- Time zone: UTC-5 (EST)
  - Summer (DST): UTC-4 (EDT)
- Area code: 570
- FIPS code: 42-131-57408
- Website: https://overfieldtwp.com/

Overfield Township is a township in Wyoming County, Pennsylvania, United States. The population was 1,427 at the 2020 census. Lake Winola is located in Overfield Township, as is the census-designated place of the same name.

== Geography ==
According to the United States Census Bureau, the township has a total area of 10.2 square miles (26 km^{2}), of which 9.9 square miles (26 km^{2}) is land and 0.3 square miles (0.78 km^{2}) (3.24%) is water.

== Demographics ==
Historical population
Census	Pop.	Note	%±
2010	1,666		—
2020	1,427		−14.3%
2021 (est.)	1,435		0.6%
U.S. Decennial Census

=== 2000 ===
At the 2000 census there were 1,532 people, 612 households, and 438 families living in the township. The population density was 155.1 inhabitants per square mile (59.9/km^{2}). There were 852 housing units at an average density of 86.3 units per square mile (33.3 units/km^{2}). The racial makeup of the township was 98.56% White, 0.26% African American, 0.07% Asian, 0.07% Pacific Islander, 0.07% from other races, and 0.98% from two or more races. Hispanic or Latino of any race were 0.46%.

Of the 612 households 32.5% had children under the age of 18 living with them, 59.5% were married couples living together, 8.7% had a female householder with no husband present, and 28.4% were non-families. 24.5% of households were one person and 8.7% were one person aged 65 or older. The average household size was 2.50 and the average family size was 2.99.

The age distribution was 25.1% under the age of 18, 6.2% from 18 to 24, 28.1% from 25 to 44, 26.5% from 45 to 64, and 14.1% 65 or older. The median age was 39 years. For every 100 females there were 105.4 males. For every 100 females age 18 and over, there were 102.3 males.

The median household income was $37,898 and the median family income was $45,216. Males had a median income of $31,897 versus $22,143 for females. The per capita income for the township was $19,034. About 7.6% of families and 9.4% of the population were below the poverty line, including 13.6% of those under age 18 and 8.5% of those age 65 or over.

=== 2010 ===
At the 2010 census there were 1,666 people, 704 households, and 466 families living in the township. The population density was 168.3 people per square mile (65.0 people/km^{2}). There were 970 housing units at an average density of 98 units per square mile (38 units/km^{2}). The racial makeup of the township was 98.1% White, 0.6% African American, 0.2% Native American, 0.1% Asian, 0.5% from other races, and 0.5% from two or more races. Hispanic or Latino of any race were 1.6%.

Of the 704 households 26.4% had children under the age of 18 living with them, 51.1% were married couples living together, 9.1% had a female householder with no husband present, and 33.8% were non-families. 26.7% of households were one person and 13% were one person aged 65 or older. The average household size was 2.37 and the average family size was 2.86.

The age distribution was 19.1% under the age of 18, 62.8% from 18 to 64, and 18.1% 65 or older. The median age was 46.5 years.

The median household income was $48,889 and the median family income was $60,875. Males had a median income of $42,708 versus $28,583 for females. The per capita income for the township was $25,158. About 0.7% of families and 2.2% of the population were below the poverty line, including 2.5% of those under age 18 and 3.5% of those age 65 or over.

== Notable people ==
- Hillary Clinton — former First Lady of the United States, U.S. Secretary of State and U.S. Senator from New York. Her father Hugh E. Rodham was born and lived in nearby Scranton, and Hillary Clinton spent much of her childhood at Lake Winola.
