= 1988 United States Senate election in Florida =

US Senate election in Florida on November 8, 1988

- November 8, 1988
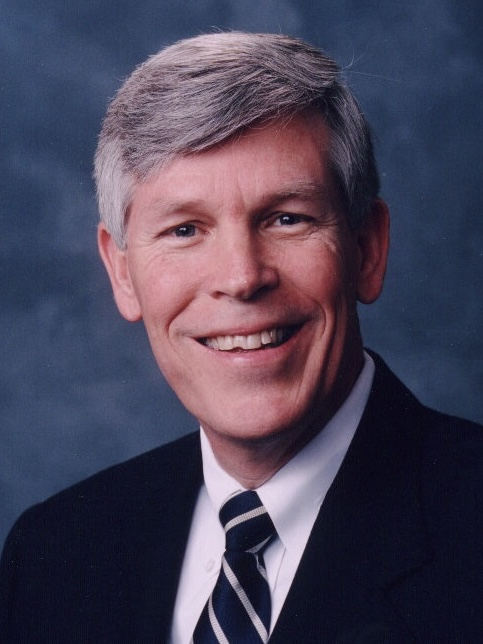

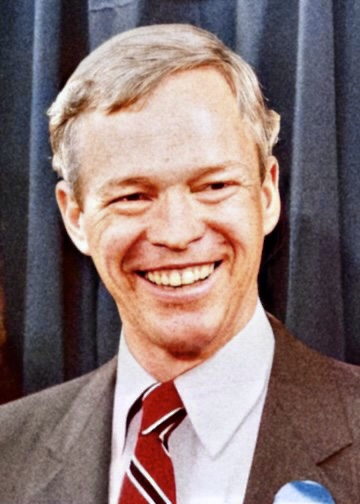
Nominee	Connie Mack III	Buddy MacKay
Party	Republican	Democratic
Popular vote	2,051,071	2,016,553
Percentage	50.42%	49.57%
- County results Mack: 50–60% 60–70% 70–80% MacKay: 50–60% 60–70%
U.S. senator before election
Lawton Chiles
Democratic
Elected U.S. Senator
Connie Mack III
Republican

The 1988 United States Senate election in Florida was held on November 8, 1988. Incumbent Democratic U.S. Senator Lawton Chiles decided to retire instead of seeking a fourth term. Republican Connie Mack III won the open seat, becoming the first Republican to hold this seat since Reconstruction in 1875.

Chiles would later run successfully for Governor of Florida in 1990 and 1994.

== Democratic primary ==
Incumbent U.S. Senator Lawton Chiles announced in December 1987, that he would not seek reelection.

Former Governor Reubin Askew announced his candidacy and was regarded as a likely nominee, but withdrew stating that he was tired of campaigning and did not like fundraising.

=== Candidates ===
- Bill Gunter, Florida State Treasurer
- Pat Frank, State Senator from Tampa
- Claude R. Kirk Jr., former Republican Governor
- Buddy MacKay, U.S. Representative from Ocala
- Dan Mica, U.S. Representative from Lake Worth

=== Results ===
Democratic primary results
Party	Candidate	Votes	%
Democratic	Bill Gunter	383,721	38.00%
Democratic	Buddy MacKay	263,946	26.14%
Democratic	Dan Mica	179,524	17.78%
Democratic	Pat Frank	119,277	11.81%
Democratic	Claude Kirk	51,387	5.09%
Democratic	Fred Rader	11,820	1.17%
Total votes		1,009,675	100.00%

Democratic primary runoff results
Party	Candidate	Votes	%
Democratic	Buddy MacKay	369,266	52.00
Democratic	Bill Gunter	340,918	48.00
Total votes		710,184	100

== Republican primary ==
In 1987, U.S. Representative Connie Mack III announced his campaign for the Republican nomination. Robert Merkle, a former U.S. Attorney, was Mack's only opposition in the Republican primary.

=== Candidates ===
- Connie Mack III, U.S. Representative from Cape Coral
- Robert Merkle, former U.S. Attorney for the Middle District of Florida

==== Speculated ====
- Jeb Bush, Secretary of Commerce of Florida (1987–1988)
- Paula Hawkins, former U.S. Senator (1981–1987)
- Bill McCollum, member of the United States House of Representatives from Florida's 5th congressional district

=== Results ===
Republican primary results
Party	Candidate	Votes	%
Republican	Connie Mack	405,296	61.78
Republican	Robert Merkle	250,730	38.22
Total votes		656,026	100

== General election ==
=== Candidates ===
- Connie Mack III, U.S. Representative (Republican)
- Buddy MacKay, U.S. Representative (Democratic)

=== Campaign ===
This senate election was heavily targeted by both parties. U.S. Representative Mack announced his candidacy back in October 1987. President Ronald Reagan endorsed Mack in June 1988 to allow Mack to focus on the general election, as he easily won the September 6 Republican primary against U.S. Attorney Robert Merkle. In May 1988, MacKay announced he would run for the open seat, and defeated Insurance Commissioner Bill Gunter in a close October 4 runoff primary election.

The general election became very nasty. MacKay tried to portray the Republican as "extremist." Mack attacked his opponent in television ads by connecting him to unpopular Massachusetts Governor and presidential candidate Michael Dukakis. Mack had help from vice presidential candidate Dan Quayle. He also ran ten-second television advertisements that said "Hey Buddy, you're a liberal," a charge MacKay could never escape. The election was so close there was a recount until MacKay conceded eight days after election day.

== Endorsements ==
List of Buddy MacKay endorsements

Statewide officials

- Bill Gunter, Treasurer, Insurance Commissioner, and Fire Marshal of Florida (1976–1989)

== Results ==
General election results
Party	Candidate	Votes	%	±%
Republican	Connie Mack III	2,051,071	50.42%	+12.15%
Democratic	Buddy MacKay	2,016,553	49.57%	−12.15%
Write-in		585	0.01%	
Majority		34,518	0.85%	−22.61%
Turnout		4,068,209		
Republican gain from Democratic				

== See also ==
- 1988 United States Senate elections

== Works cited ==
- Moreland, Laurence; Steed, Robert; Baker, Tod, eds. (1991). The 1988 Presidential Election in the South: Continuity Amidst Change in Southern Party Politics. Praeger Publishers. ISBN 0275931455.
