= Robert E. O'Neill =

American attorney

United States Attorney for the Middle District of Florida
- In office October 5, 2010 – July 8, 2013
- President: Barack Obama
- Preceded by: A. Brian Albritton
- Succeeded by: A. Lee Bentley III

Personal details
- Political party: [Unknown]

Robert E. O'Neill is an American attorney who served as the United States Attorney for the Middle District of Florida from 2010 to 2013.
