= Maria Chapa Lopez =

American attorney

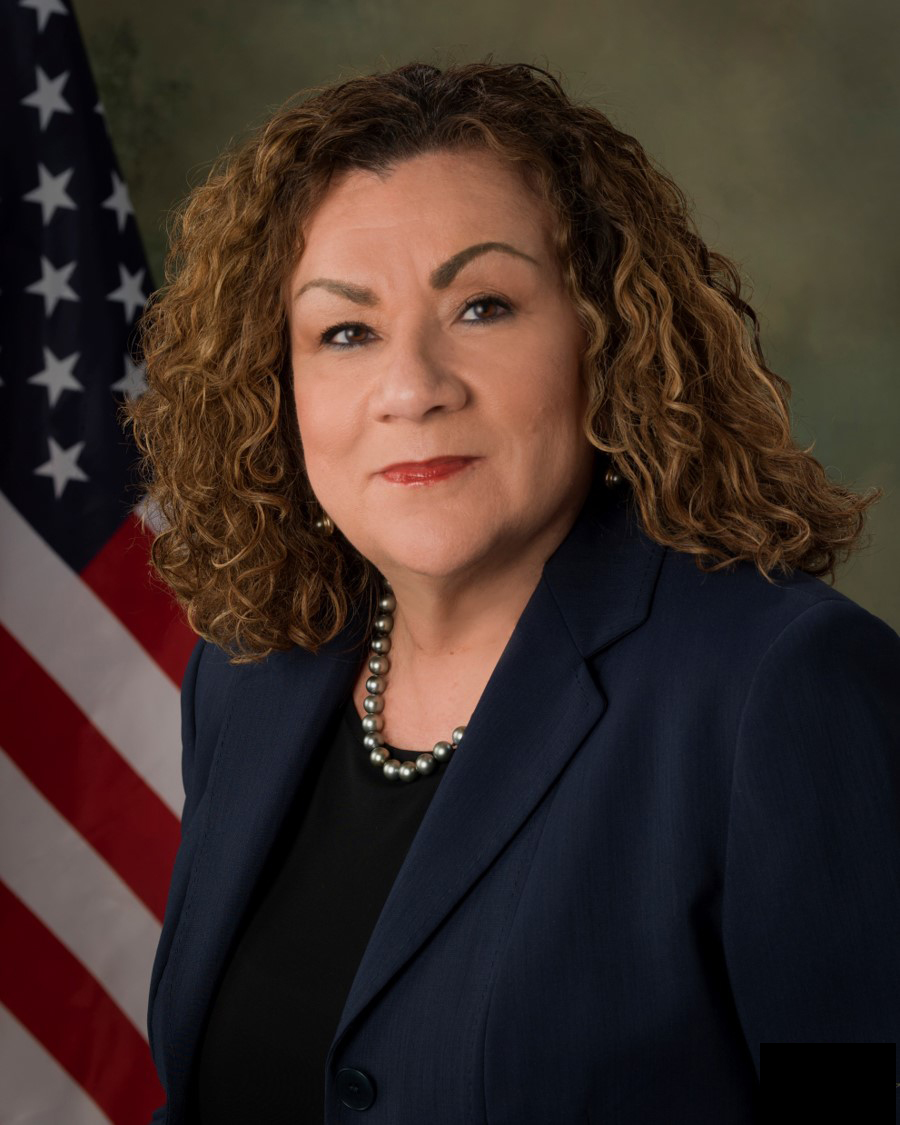

United States Attorney for the Middle District of Florida
- In office January 5, 2018 – February 27, 2021; Interim: January 5, 2018 – September 3, 2018
- President: Donald Trump; Joe Biden
- Preceded by: A. Lee Bentley III
- Succeeded by: Karin Hoppmann (acting)

Personal details
- Education: University of Texas (BA); South Texas College of Law (JD); The JAG School (LLM)

Military service
- Branch/service: United States Army
- Rank: Lieutenant colonel

Maria Chapa Lopez is an American attorney who served as the United States attorney for the Middle District of Florida from 2018 to 2021.

== Early life and education ==
Chapa Lopez's parents were born in Mexico and immigrated to the United States, settling in Chicago in the 1950s. When Chapa Lopez was a child, her family moved to Odessa, Texas. According to Chapa Lopez, she spent summers with her grandparents in Mexico while growing up.

Chapa Lopez received her Bachelor of Arts from the University of Texas, and her Juris Doctor from South Texas College of Law, thereafter joining the United States Army and earning her Master of Laws from the JAG School at the University of Virginia.

== Career ==
=== Early career ===
Chapa Lopez spent more than a decade as a judge advocate in the United States Army, leaving at the rank of lieutenant colonel.

From April 2000 to April 2016, she worked as an assistant United States attorney in the U.S. Attorney's Office for the Middle District of Florida, prosecuting complex transnational and domestic drug trafficking organizations, large-scale money laundering cases, and complex opioid cases. From April 2016 to January 2018, she was the U.S. Department of Justice Deputy Attaché in the U.S. Embassy in Mexico City.

=== U.S. Attorney for the Middle District of Florida ===
On January 3, 2018, United States attorney general Jeff Sessions announced the appointment of Chapa Lopez to serve as interim U.S. attorney after the resignation of A. Lee Bentley III.

On May 10, 2018, President Trump announced his intent to nominate Chapa Lopez to be the United States attorney for the Middle District of Florida. On May 15, 2018, her nomination was sent to the Senate. On July 12, 2018, her nomination was reported out of committee by a voice vote. On August 28, 2018, her nomination was confirmed in the United States Senate by voice vote. She was sworn into office on September 4, 2018.

Chapa Lopez resigned on February 27, 2021, following the presidential transition of Joe Biden.

=== Board of Veterans Appeals ===
On June 1, 2026, President Trump nominated Chapa Lopez for a six-year term as Chairman of the Board of Veterans Appeals.

== Personal life ==
Chapa Lopez is married to a deputy sheriff with the Hillsborough County Sheriff's Office, whom she met while they were both in the U.S. Army.

According to Chapa Lopez, she is a fan of the conceptual artist Jesus Ortiz.

Chapa Lopez speaks English and Spanish.
