= Dorothy Howell Rodham =

American mother of Hillary Rodham Clinton (1919–2011)

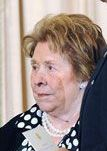
- Rodham in 2009
- Born: Dorothy Emma Howell; June 4, 1919; Chicago, Illinois, U.S.
- Died: November 1, 2011 (aged 92); Washington, D.C., U.S.
- Education: Oakton Community College (AA)
- Known for: Being the mother of Hillary Clinton
- Political party: Democratic
- Spouse: Hugh Rodham (m. 1942; died 1993)
- Children: Hillary; Hugh; Tony
- Relatives: Bill Clinton (son-in-law); Chelsea Clinton (granddaughter); Marc Mezvinsky (grandson-in-law)

Dorothy Emma Howell Rodham (June 4, 1919 – November 1, 2011) was an American homemaker and the mother of former first lady, U.S. senator, United States secretary of state, and 2016 Democratic Party presidential nominee Hillary Clinton.

== Early life ==
Dorothy Howell was born in Chicago on June 4, 1919, the elder of two daughters of Edwin John Howell, Jr., a Chicago firefighter, and Della Murray. She had a younger sister, Isabelle (born 1924). Her ancestry consisted of Welsh, English, Scottish, French, and distant Dutch heritage; her paternal grandfather was an immigrant from Bedminster, Bristol in England, and many of her recent forebears had lived in Canada.

Her childhood has been described as Dickensian. The family lived as boarders in a crowded house. The parents were dysfunctional and unhappy and sometimes prone to violent fights; they moved Dorothy around various schools, and paid only occasional attention to the children, before divorcing in 1927.

President Barack Obama after a ceremony in the White House on the life of Dorothy Rodham, November 1, 2011 (0:59)
Video of President Obama discussing the life of Dorothy Rodham.

Audio version:

The children were then sent on a train by themselves, unsupervised (Dorothy was eight years old, Isabelle only three), to live with their paternal grandparents in the Los Angeles suburb of Alhambra, California. The sisters endured harsh and unloving treatment from their grandparents. The grandmother favored black Victorian dress and punished the girls for trifling acts. After Dorothy was caught trick-or-treating one Halloween, an activity the grandparents forbade, she was confined to her room for an entire year except for attending school, and reportedly not even allowed to eat in the kitchen or play in the yard.

Dorothy left home at the young age of fourteen in the depths of the Great Depression, working as a housekeeper, cook, and nanny for a San Gabriel, California family, being paid $3 a week. Encouraged by her employer to read and go to school, Dorothy attended Alhambra High School, where she joined several clubs and benefited from two teachers.

After graduating from Alhambra in 1937, she moved to Chicago for a failed reunion with her mother, who by then had married Max Rosenberg. Subsequently, she moved into her own apartment there and took office jobs to support herself. She later said, "I'd hoped so hard that my mother would love me that I had to take the chance and find out. When she didn't, I had nowhere else to go." Hillary Rodham Clinton later attributed her interest in children's welfare to her mother's life as well as her belief that caring adults outside of family can fill a child's emotional voids.

== Marriage and family ==
While applying for a job as a clerk typist at a textile company, she met a traveling salesman named Hugh Ellsworth Rodham, eight years her senior, in 1937. After a lengthy courtship, they married in early 1942.

Their first child and only daughter, Hillary, was born on October 26, 1947. (In 1995, Hillary Clinton said her mother had named her after Sir Edmund Hillary, co-first mountaineer to scale Mount Everest, and that was the reason for the less-common "two L's" spelling of her name. However, the Everest climb did not take place until 1953, more than five years after she was born. In October 2006, a Clinton spokeswoman said she was not named after the mountain climber. Instead, this account of her name's origin "was a sweet family story her mother shared to inspire greatness in her daughter, to great results I might add.")

At the time of Hillary's birth, they were living in a one-bedroom apartment in the Edgewater neighborhood of Chicago. The second child, a son named Hugh, was born in 1950 and during that year, the growing Rodham family moved into a two-story, three-bedroom house in suburban Park Ridge, Illinois. The couple's third child, a son named Tony, was born in 1954. Dorothy was a full-time homemaker, not only raising the three children but taking pride in her decorating sense, as she provided the house with cozy furniture, antiques, stained-glass windows, and attractive curtains from her husband's business.

Dorothy encouraged Hillary to have a love for learning and to pursue an education and a career, though she had never done so herself. As she later recalled, "I never saw any difference in gender, as far as capabilities or aspirations were concerned. Just because [Hillary] was a girl didn't mean she should be limited." In contrast to her husband's staunch Republican views, Dorothy Rodham was, as her daughter later wrote, essentially a Democrat, "although she kept it quiet in Republican Park Ridge." She taught Sunday school at the First United Methodist Church of Park Ridge.

During the 1970s, once her children were grown up, Rodham took courses at Oakton Community College in a variety of subjects, receiving high grades and earning an associate's degree in liberal arts. She was among the first mothers of that generation to return to school.

In 1987, Rodham and her husband moved to Little Rock, Arkansas, to be closer to their daughter and help care for their young granddaughter, Chelsea. She took courses in subjects that happened to interest her, focusing on psychology but including logic and child development, although she never gained a further degree. Her daughter later wrote in her 2003 memoir Living History, "I'm still amazed at how my mother emerged from her lonely early life as such an affectionate and levelheaded woman."

== Later life ==
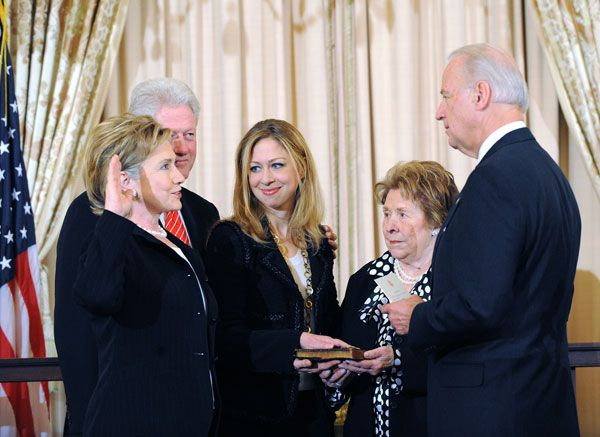
At Hillary Rodham Clinton's swearing in as U.S. Secretary of State on January 21, 2009

Her husband Hugh Rodham died in 1993, shortly after their daughter became First Lady of the United States. Dorothy Rodham remained active but valued her privacy and almost never spoke to the media. She spent more time at the White House and accompanied Hillary and Chelsea on visits to France, India, and China; she also enjoyed life in Washington, D.C.

At the 1996 Democratic National Convention, when Bill Clinton was nominated for re-election, she appeared in a video message, saying "Everybody knows there is only one person in the world who can really tell the truth about a man, and that's his mother-in-law." Following the Lewinsky scandal she was reportedly angry at Bill, but encouraged Hillary to seek her own political career.

When her daughter was elected to the U.S. Senate in 2000, she moved to Washington, D.C., living along Connecticut Avenue. She appeared on The Oprah Winfrey Show in 2004. Once living alone became too much for her, in 2006, she moved into the Clintons' large Whitehaven house in the Kalorama neighborhood of Washington, D.C. There she would often sit and discuss the day when her daughter came home from work.

Starting in December 2007, she made a rare public appearance in Iowa and other early primary states to campaign for Hillary Clinton's 2008 presidential campaign. She appeared at some events concerning women's issues and also appeared in a Clinton campaign television advertisement. She was seen wiping away a tear when her daughter conceded her presidential bid in June 2008, but then was in attendance when her daughter was sworn in as Secretary of State on January 21, 2009. In her final years, her health began to fail due to heart problems.

Rodham died at George Washington University Hospital on November 1, 2011, in Washington, D.C., with Secretary Clinton cancelling a trip overseas, to be by her side; no cause was given. Other family members were present as well. A small memorial service was held for her at Whitehaven.

== Legacy ==
The William J. Clinton Presidential Center held an exhibit featuring Dorothy Howell Rodham and Virginia Dell Kelley, the mother of Bill Clinton, in 2012. It was introduced by a video from Chelsea Clinton in which she talked about the influence her grandmothers had had on her.

In her 2014 memoir Hard Choices, Hillary Rodham Clinton wrote of Dorothy Howell Rodham, "No one had a bigger influence on my life or did more to shape the person I became." The struggles that she went through became a major theme of the June 2015 kickoff event to Clinton's 2016 presidential campaign. They were repeated when Clinton gave a victory speech upon clinching the Democratic nomination in early June 2016, saying, "I wish she could see her daughter become the Democratic nominee for President of the United States."
