= John B. Coffey =

John Brindley Coffey (May 8, 1921 – November 26, 2013) was a Lieutenant Colonel in the USAAF who flew with the Hell's Angels in the 303d Bombardment Group in World War II and was deputy chairman and then Chairman of the USAAF NATO Planning Liaison Group during the Cold War.

== Early life ==
He was born in Rossville, Georgia, United States, to Robert L. Coffey, a brick manufacturer and Curie Ethel Brindley, a milliner. He is the 2nd of three sons, between Robert L. Coffey, Jr. born 1918, and William B. Coffey born 1923. Both his brothers became pilots in the USAAF, and both died in plane crashes.

After the failure of his business during the Great Depression, Robert Coffey, Sr. moved the family first to Philadelphia and finally to Johnstown, Pennsylvania, where he found work as supervisor in a coal mine. John Coffey followed his father into the mine and became a member of the UMWA.

== Military career ==
He joined the USAAF in 1939, in Santa Ana, California, training as a glider pilot in Pittsburg, Kansas. In 1943 the glider pilot program was winding down; he became a cadet/navigator and received training in Albuquerque, Santa Ana, and Sacramento before shipping out.

Stationed in Molesworth, England, one of the first Eighth Air Force stations attached to the USAAF, he was assigned to the 303d Bombardment Group, 427th Bombardment Squadron. In two B-17 Flying Fortress tours, he was credited with 35 bombing missions over Nazi Germany. Midway through the missions, after developing and conducting a navigational training curriculum for pilots, he was promoted to lead navigator.

In 1948 he left active service, and returned to the United States, and while still in the Military Reserves, enrolled in the University of Miami on the GI Bill. There he met Valerie Kendall, and they were married in 1949. They honeymooned in Havana, Cuba, and had three sons: Christopher, Kendall, and Kevin.

== Cold War ==
In 1950 at the beginning of the Korean War, he was recalled to active duty and began training in the new technologies that the Strategic Air Command in the early years of the Cold War was developing under the leadership of then-Lieutenant General Curtis LeMay. The stated mission was being able to strike anywhere in the world. To do so demanded development and integration in the areas of jet engines, in-air refueling, ballistic missiles, and ultimately nuclear missiles.

Lt. Col. Coffey became part of War Planning Operations and was stationed variously at Loring Air Force Base, Robins Air Force Base, and Westover Air Force Base, headquarters of the Eighth Air Force, where he was on the IG team inspecting Strategic Air Command facilities for standards.

In 1966 he was redeployed overseas and assigned to Lindsey Air Station in Wiesbaden, Germany, headquarters for United States Air Forces in Europe – Air Forces Africa (USAFE), while the family found housing at Finthen Army Airfield in Mainz. While in Mainz his skills as a community liaison prompted an invitation for him to join the Reitercorps of the Mainzer Ranzengarde, a local equestrian club, an honor normally reserved for Germans.

As Deputy of Operations, headquarters, USAFE, he served as Chief of the Special Plans Branch where he was responsible for HQ USAFE "planning for all aspects of unconventional warfare in the European theater, supervision and coordination of all Berlin contingency planning, involving frequent and very sensitive high-level coordination and conferences with military and civilian planners of four nations." He created an operational planning concept covering all aspects of conventional warfare that became a basic reference for the work of the USAFE Force Employment Panel on which Lt. Col. Coffey was assistant chairman and coordinator. The panel's determinations largely affected strategy and tactics for U.S. and NATO war planning in Europe.

In 1969 he officially retired and was transferred back to Homestead Air Force Base and then into civilian life.

Among the decorations Lt. Col. Coffey received were the Air Force Commendation Medal, the First Oak Leaf Cluster to the Air Force Commendation Medal, and the Meritorious Service Medal.

== Private life ==
In 1977 the Coffeys moved to Moore Haven, Florida, where they bought a ranch and raised cattle. In 1980 he entered the Democratic primary for the U.S. Senate but did not qualify for the runoff which went to Bill Gunter. Gunter ultimately lost to Republican Paula Hawkins, the only woman elected to the US Senate from Florida.

He became active in local politics and served as a Glades County Commissioner from 1982 to 1990, and as Commissioner Chairman for two years. He also played a prominent role in the movement to preserve public access for Fisheating Creek when private interests threatened to abolish it.

Valerie Coffey died in 2005, and Lt. Col. Coffey died on November 26, 2013, in West Palm Beach, Florida.
