= Tony Rodham =

American consultant and businessman; brother of Hillary Rodham Clinton

- Born: August 8, 1954; Chicago, Illinois, U.S.
- Died: June 7, 2019 (aged 64)
- Occupation: Businessman
- Known for: Brother of Hillary Rodham Clinton
- Political party: Democratic
- Spouses: Nicole Boxer (m. 1994; div. 2001) Megan Madden (m. 2005)
- Children: 3
- Parent(s): Hugh Rodham; Dorothy Howell
- Relatives: Hillary Clinton (sister); Hugh Rodham (brother); Chelsea Clinton (niece); Bill Clinton (brother-in-law)

Anthony Dean Rodham (August 8, 1954 – June 7, 2019) was an American consultant and businessman who was the youngest brother of Hillary Clinton and brother-in-law of former U.S. President Bill Clinton.

== Early life and education ==
Born in Chicago on August 8, 1954, Rodham was raised in a United Methodist family in suburban Park Ridge, Illinois. His father, Hugh Ellsworth Rodham (1911–1993), was of Welsh and English descent. He managed a successful small business in the textile industry. His mother, Dorothy Emma Howell (1919–2011), was a homemaker of English, Scottish, French Canadian, and Welsh descent. He was the younger brother of Hillary and Hugh.

Attending Maine South High School in Park Ridge, Rodham was known as what one writer later termed a "fun-loving jock" and was not as academically oriented as his sister had been.

Rodham subsequently attended Iowa Wesleyan College and the University of Arkansas, although he never received a degree from either school.

== Career ==
=== Early career ===
Rodham worked on future brother-in-law Bill Clinton's 1974 nomination campaign for Congress. He then worked at a metal equipment company in Texas, sold insurance in Chicago, acted as a repossessor in Chicago, where shots were fired at him in the notorious Cabrini–Green housing project, and worked as a prison guard, a job that Bill Clinton helped him get. He moved to South Florida in 1983, where he shared a condominium with his brother Hugh, and worked as a process server and private detective until 1992.

=== 1992–2006 ===
In 1992, during Bill Clinton's first presidential campaign, Rodham began working for the Democratic National Committee, coordinating constituency outreach. In 1993, he and his brother Hugh ignited a small controversy when they tried to solicit corporate donations for Clinton's inaugural parties; they dropped the effort after a public outcry.

By 1994, Rodham had left his position at the Democratic National Committee and described himself as "a consultant ... [in] all kinds of businesses. I'm a general consultant. I just bring different peoples together. I help them negotiate deals. I solve problems for people." In 1997, Rodham tried to arrange meetings between Paraguayan President Juan Carlos Wasmosy and Bill Clinton, and also powerful Moscow mayor Yuri Luzhkov and the president. In 1998, he paid a visit to dictatorial Prime Minister Hun Sen of Cambodia. In each of these cases, there was criticism that he was giving an unauthorized impression of White House approval to these foreign figures, or was seeking financial gain for himself.

In 1999, Rodham and his brother Hugh Rodham entered into an $118 million venture to grow and export hazelnuts from the Republic of Georgia. The U.S. State Department and National Security Advisor Sandy Berger became upset, however, when the Rodhams' local business connection in Batumi turned out to be Aslan Abashidze, a major political opponent of Georgian President Eduard Shevardnadze, then a key U.S. ally in the region. Moreover, Rodham flew to Rome to become godfather to Abashidze's grandson. After initial resistance, Berger and the Clintons prevailed upon the Rodham brothers to drop the deal. Rodham would not state what his financial stake in the venture was.

Episodes such as these led Hillary Clinton's White House staff to refer to Rodham and his brother as "the Brothers Rodham", extending the American tradition of troublesome presidential siblings to the brother-in-law category. One senior White House official would be quoted as saying, "You never wanted to hear their name come up in any context other than playing golf."

In March 2001, it was revealed that Rodham had helped gain a March 2000 presidential pardon for Edgar Allen Gregory Jr., and his wife, Vonna Jo, a Tennessee couple in the carnival business who had been convicted of bank fraud. The pardon was granted over the objections of the U.S. Justice Department. Rodham acknowledged talking to Bill Clinton about a pardon; he said he received no money for his work, but he did have financial ties to the couple as a consultant. His actions gained much public focus and criticism, as they came on the heels of the general Bill Clinton pardons controversy and his brother Hugh's own involvement in taking money for work done towards pardons. Hillary Clinton, who had strongly criticized Hugh Rodham's involvement and requested he return his money, said that Tony Rodham was not paid for his work. The Republican-controlled House Committee on Oversight and Government Reform investigated the matter and concluded that Tony Rodham had in fact been paid. One aspect of the case dragged out into 2007, as Tony Rodham battled a bankruptcy court's order that he repay over $100,000 in loans from the now-deceased Edgar Gregory.

=== 2007–2019 ===
As of mid-2007, Tony Rodham was helping Hillary Clinton raise funds in Pennsylvania for her 2008 presidential campaign. By the end of 2007, he was back in the news for owing Nicole Boxer about $158,000 in back alimony, child support, and related payments following a court judgment. This earned him renewed unfavorable publicity, including the headline "HILL'S BROTHER A DEADBEAT" in the New York Post. In May 2008, he expressed disgust with how the Democratic National Committee was handling the Michigan and Florida primary delegate issue between Clinton and Barack Obama, and said he did not know who he would vote for if his sister were not nominated.

By the early 2010s, after a string of unsuccessful ventures in oil and gas, water, housing, pharmaceuticals, and tutoring, Rodham was in financial distress, behind on his mortgage payments, facing home foreclosure, and being sued by his lawyer in the child support case for lack of payment. He said in a legal proceeding that while the Clintons had helped him in the past, including paying for his son's school tuition, that was over: "Hillary and Bill are done. I mean, look at what they've done for me. They've given me money all the time."

Nevertheless, Bill Clinton did help him get a job with longtime Clinton associate Terry McAuliffe to find foreign investors for GreenTech Automotive, a firm owned by McAuliffe and lawyer Charlie Wang. Rodham did not play a large, hands-on role in this effort, however, and a trip to China that he made to recruit investors went sour due to Chinese resentment of various Clinton administration actions, including the 1999 United States bombing of the Chinese embassy in Belgrade. GreenTech declared Chapter 11 bankruptcy in February 2018.

Rodham found himself in the news again in 2013 when it was disclosed that Alejandro Mayorkas, the director of the United States Citizenship and Immigration Services and President Obama's nominee for United States Deputy Secretary of Homeland Security, was being investigated by the Department of Homeland Security Office of Inspector General for Mayorkas' role in helping Gulf Coast Funds Management secure approval for participating in the EB-5 visa program for foreign investors. Rodham had been president and CEO of Gulf Coast Funds Management, a financing firm, since 2010 or so. The firm had been granted the go-ahead even though the original application had been denied and an appeal had been rejected. At least one of the visas that Rodham's firm was trying to acquire was for Huawei Technologies, a Chinese telecommunications company sometimes accused of close connections with Chinese intelligence operations.

In 2015, the Inspector General issued a report that on the GreenTech Automotive matter that criticized Mayorkas for creating the appearance of favoritism but passed no particular judgment on either Rodham or McAuliffe. In 2015, an investment fund where Rodham was working as Chief Global EB5 Investor Relations & Government Affairs, the Global City Regional Center, was also using him to recruit EB-5 visa foreign investors in China for a community center project in Philadelphia Chinatown.

Following the 2010 Haiti earthquake and with Bill Clinton co-chair of the Interim Haiti Recovery Commission, Rodham and some partners proposed a $22 million deal to rebuild homes in the devastated nation, with funding to come from the Clinton Foundation. The deal never went forward and the Clinton Foundation said it was unaware of the proposal. In October 2013, Rodham joined the advisory board of VCS Mining, a Delaware-based company that was planning a gold mine in the Cap-Haïtien Arrondissement area of Haiti. By 2015 the project had become controversial due to possible environmental effects and the level of foreign ownership; for his part Rodham objected to any inference that he had gotten this position due to his family: "I'm a very accomplished person in my own right. I raise money for a lot of people. That's what I basically do." On February 19, 2016, he resigned as a board member from VCS Mining as part of a "restructuring plan" with no disagreement among the parties implied.

During the Hillary Clinton 2016 presidential campaign, he and Hugh appeared with her at a rally in their childhood summer home of Scranton, Pennsylvania in April 2016. He otherwise kept a low profile during the campaign.

The GreenTech Automotive matter reemerged in November 2017 when McAuliffe and Rodham were hit with a $17 million lawsuit from a group of thirty-two Chinese investors in it, charging fraud. However, in April 2018, a federal judge dismissed both McAuliffe and Rodham from the case. On June 12, 2019, the Fourth U.S. Circuit Court of Appeals upheld the ruling from the federal court in Alexandria, Virginia judge who said the suit was not specific enough about how allegedly misleading and false statements from McAuliffe and Rodham induced the Chinese nationals to invest in the project.

== Personal life and death ==
At a party in East Hampton, New York, following the 1992 Democratic National Convention, Rodham met Nicole Boxer, daughter of a U.S. Congresswoman from California and U.S. Senate candidate, Barbara Boxer, and the two began dating. On May 28, 1994, Rodham and Boxer were married in a ceremony at the White House attended by 250 guests; it was the first White House wedding since Tricia Nixon married Edward Cox in 1971. The couple had one son, Zachary, born in 1995 (who later held a unique distinction in that he was simultaneously the grandson and nephew of sitting U.S. senators). Rodham and his wife separated by 2000, and were divorced around 2001. Although the situation was difficult, both sides of the greater family continued to work together politically and be involved in Zachary's life.

In August 2001, Rodham was involved in an assault at the multi-generational Rodham family summer cottage at Lake Winola in Wyoming County, Pennsylvania. A man who said he saw Rodham having sex with his girlfriend broke into the cottage and assaulted him; Hugh Rodham and the woman restrained the attacker. At a hearing on the case in November 2001, Tony Rodham testified that he might have smoked marijuana with the attacker several hours before the incident. The man subsequently entered a plea of guilty to trespassing, assault, and making terroristic threats.

By 2002, Rodham was in dispute with his former wife over child support payments, with Nicole Boxer saying he had not paid them in six months. In the summer of 2005, Tony Rodham married Megan Madden of Vienna, Virginia. Rodham had two children with Madden named Simon and Fiona, and settled in Vienna, Virginia.

According to Hillary Clinton, Rodham died on June 7, 2019, at the age of 64; his death was announced by his sister on Twitter on June 8. The cause of death was not announced.
