= Hugh Rodham (born 1911) =

Father of Hillary Rodham Clinton

- Born: Hugh Ellsworth Rodham; April 2, 1911; Scranton, Pennsylvania, U.S.
- Died: April 7, 1993 (aged 82); Little Rock, Arkansas, U.S.
- Resting place: Washburn Street Cemetery
- Education: Pennsylvania State University (BS)
- Occupation: Businessman
- Political party: Republican
- Spouse: Dorothy Howell (m. 1942)
- Children: Hillary; Hugh; Tony
- Relatives: Bill Clinton (son-in-law); Chelsea Clinton (granddaughter)

Hugh Ellsworth Rodham (April 2, 1911 – April 7, 1993) was an American businessman. He was the father of Hillary Clinton.

== Early life and education ==
Hugh Ellsworth Rodham was born on April 2, 1911, in Scranton, Pennsylvania, the son of Hugh Rodham (1879–1965) and Hannah Jones (1882–1952). His parents were from the United Kingdom. His father emigrated from Oxhill, County Durham, England, at a young age with his family and was the son of a coal miner. His mother was born in Pennsylvania, to immigrant parents from Wales, one of whom was from Merthyr Tydfil; she was also descended from coal miner parents.

Rodham attended Pennsylvania State University and was a third-string tight end for the Penn State Nittany Lions football team. He joined the Delta Upsilon. He graduated with a Bachelor of Science degree in physical education from the College of Education in 1935, at the height of the Great Depression.

== Career ==
Rodham briefly worked for his mother's employer, Scranton Lace Company, then freighthopped to Chicago without telling his parents. Rodham found work there selling drapery fabrics around the Midwest, sending the money he made back home.

In World War II, Rodham served in the United States Navy. He became a chief petty officer stationed at the Great Lakes Naval Station, performing training duties for sailors headed for the Pacific Ocean theater of World War II. After the war, he established a successful career in the textile supply industry, starting with Rodrik Fabrics, a drapery fabric business located in Chicago's famous Merchandise Mart building. His company made draperies and window shades; customers included offices, hotels, airlines, and theaters. He later opened a fabric print plant building on the North Side. During the 1940s, Rodham and his wife Dorothy lived in the Edgewater neighborhood of Chicago.

Rodham entered politics once. Hoping to work his way into favor with the Cook County Democratic Party political machine in order to capitalize on a downtown investment he had made, he ran for Chicago alderman as a Democratic-leaning independent in 1947. The contest, held in Chicago's 49th Ward, was won by Frank Keenan, a Democratic ward committeeman running on the regular Democratic line, with 17,073 votes; a Republican, Joseph Reubens, finished second with 5,509 votes. Rodham finished fifth out of eight candidates with only 382 votes, or 1.5 percent of the total votes cast. According to some family members, this episode led to his strong dislike of the Democratic Party for the rest of his life.

Rodham was a staunch supporter of Barry Goldwater's 1964 presidential campaign and remained a committed Republican until his death. Even after his daughter married Democrat Bill Clinton, he (according to Bill Clinton) "never gave up hope that his son-in-law would join him in the Republican Party and support a cut in the capital gains tax." In late 1992, following son-in-law Bill Clinton's election as president, Rodham made a cameo appearance on the television comedy Hearts Afire, whose producers were friends of the Clintons.

== Personal life ==
In 1937, while Rodham was making a sales call at a textile company, he met Dorothy Emma Howell (1919–2011), who was applying for a job at that company. After a lengthy courtship, they married in early 1942. The Rodhams had three children: Hillary (born 1947), Hugh (born 1950), and Tony (1954–2019). In 1950, they moved to the more affluent Chicago suburb of Park Ridge, Illinois. The family still maintained ties to Scranton: all three children were christened there, and they spent summers in a rural region that overlooks Lake Winola, located in Overfield Township in the Endless Mountains area of Pennsylvania. staying in a cottage that in 1921, Hugh and his father had built themselves.

=== Death ===
Hugh Rodham died in Little Rock, Arkansas, on Wednesday, April 7, 1993, five days after his 82nd birthday, three weeks after suffering a stroke, and less than three months after his son-in-law Bill Clinton's inauguration as 42nd President of the United States. Following a private memorial service in Little Rock attended by the Clintons, he was buried in the Washburn Street Cemetery in his native Scranton, Pennsylvania, in a private funeral also attended by the Clinton family.
