= Hugh Rodham (born 1950) =

American lawyer (born 1950)

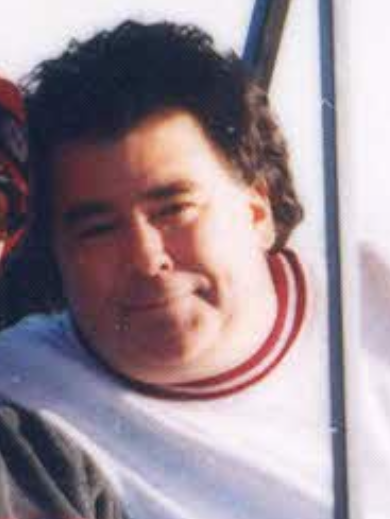
- Rodham in 1997

Personal details
- Born: May 26, 1950 (age 76) Chicago, Illinois, U.S.
- Party: Democratic
- Spouse: Maria Victoria Arias (m. 1986)
- Parent(s): Hugh Rodham; Dorothy Howell
- Relatives: Hillary Rodham Clinton (sister); Tony Rodham (brother)
- Education: Pennsylvania State University, University Park (BS); University of Arkansas, Fayetteville (MA, JD)

Hugh Edwin Rodham (born May 26, 1950) is an American lawyer and former Democratic Party politician who is the only surviving brother of Hillary Rodham Clinton. In 1989, Rodham became Assistant Public Defender for the Miami Drug Court. Rodham made one run for political office, winning the 1994 Democratic nomination for the United States Senate seat from Florida, but losing the general election to incumbent Senator Connie Mack III. During the Clinton administration, some of his actions came under public scrutiny. Since then he has been in private practice as a lawyer.

== Early life ==
Rodham was raised in a United Methodist family in suburban Park Ridge, Illinois. His father, Hugh Ellsworth Rodham (1911–1993), was of Welsh and English descent. He managed a successful small business in the textile industry. His mother, Dorothy Emma Howell (1919–2011), was a homemaker of English, Scottish, French Canadian, and Welsh descent. Hugh has an older sister, Hillary, and younger brother, Tony. He was often referred to as "Hughie" growing up, to distinguish him from his father, and that name form would persist into adulthood at times.

Attending Maine South High School in Park Ridge, Rodham was known as what one writer later termed a "fun-loving jock" and was not as academically oriented as his sister had been. He graduated from Maine South High School in 1968, playing on the football, wrestling, and baseball teams.

Like his father, Rodham attended Pennsylvania State University, graduating in 1972 with a Bachelor of Science degree from the College of Health and Human Development. While attending Penn State he was backup quarterback on the Penn State Nittany Lions football team. Rodham was also an active member of the Sigma Triton charge of Theta Delta Chi fraternity at Penn State.

He served in the Peace Corps in Colombia for over a year, training teachers; he later called it the most rewarding experience of his life. He then gained advanced degrees in education (M.A.) and law (J.D.) at the University of Arkansas, the latter occurring while Bill Clinton was governor of the state.

== Public defender ==
Rodham moved to Miami, where he began to practice criminal law; from around 1980 he became an investigator for the public defender in Dade County. For a while there he shared a condominium with his brother Tony. While frequently paired together in commentary, the brothers have distinct personalities; Hugh has been compared by friends and acquaintances to the Norm Peterson character from the television series Cheers.

Rodham married Maria Victoria Arias, a Cuban immigrant lawyer whom he met while she was interning at the public defender's office, in 1986. She had come to the United States from Cuba around 1960, as Fidel Castro took power, when she was two years old. She graduated from the University of Miami School of Law in 1989 and subsequently became an established real estate lawyer. She switched from being a Republican to a Democrat during the Bill Clinton presidential campaign, 1992, and founded a group known as Cuban-American Women for Clinton. A 1993 Washington Post story described her as "a smart, tough attorney, a Cuban version of Hillary." She has given both Bill and Hillary Clinton advice on Cuba matters and an immediate connection to the Cuban exile community in Miami. The couple have lived in Coral Gables, Florida, during their married life and do not have any children.

In 1989 the groundbreaking, much imitated Miami Drug Court was co-founded by State Attorney Janet Reno, Chief Judge Gerald Wetherington, and Public Defender Bennett Brummer. Seeking to combat the crack cocaine epidemic of the time, it sought to find nonviolent drug users and give addicts structured programs to overcome addiction, often in lieu of a jail sentence. Rodham became Assistant Public Defender in the court. In this work Rodham was praised by local officials for effective, tireless work for long hours at low wages; Rodham himself would later say, "Public Defenders are the last bastion for liberty ... we provide a strong defense for every citizen accused." Reno would later credit Rodham for making the Drug Court a success: "That drug court could never have been established without the cooperation of the public defender ... [who] was a fellow by the name of Hugh Rodham, the assistant public defender. And we didn't know who Hugh Rodham was in those days, but one thing he did was get his clients in the back room, and every now and then you could hear him raise his voice and tell them to get with it and let's go. ... He was assiduous in protecting his clients' rights, but he was also extraordinarily helpful in making sure his clients understood that here was a real chance to solve their problems."

In 1993, Hugh Rodham and his brother Tony ignited a small controversy when they tried to solicit corporate donations for Clinton's inaugural parties; they dropped the effort after a public outcry. Once the Clintons entered the White House, Rodham became a sometime golfing buddy of the President and he and Maria often joined family get-togethers at Camp David. When Clinton was having trouble with his cabinet nominations, Rodham recommended Reno to the president for appointment as U.S. Attorney General.

== Run for U.S. Senate ==
Rodham left the public defenders office to run for the United States Senate in Florida in 1994. He had some basic problems as a candidate, including having to explain why he had never registered to vote in the state until 1992. In addition, his campaign manager left the campaign after not getting paid for weeks when told there was no money but discovered that funds were in the account he actually set up. Rodham did not always demonstrate a deep understanding of the political issues of the day and had difficulty being taken seriously by political commentators.

In the contest for the Democratic Party nomination, Rodham competed in a four-person primary field and finished first with 34 percent, which meant there would be a runoff election. After the first primary, the third-place finisher, Miami lawyer Ellis Rubin, joined forces with Rodham as a "senior executive consultant" and hatchet man.

The second-place finisher and other entrant in the runoff was Mike Wiley, a talk radio personality and advocate of UFO conspiracy theories. In the presence of Rodham at a press conference, Rubin leveled the accusation that Wiley was hiding his Jewish faith by changing his name from his birth name, Michael Schreiber, and that Wiley "changed his name before the campaign to deceive voters about his Jewish religion." Rodham won the runoff contest by a margin of 58 to 42 percent, but as a result of the friction that had developed, Wiley refused to endorse Rodham afterward.

In the general election contest against incumbent Republican Senator Connie Mack III, Rodham had few funds, only one television commercial, and little support from the Florida Democratic party establishment in a year that saw Republican gains everywhere. Bill and Hillary Clinton both campaigned for Rodham, but his organization was unable to take advantage of their help. In one case late in the race, Bill Clinton flew to Miami to speak at a rally for Rodham but only 200 people were in the audience due to poor advance work by the campaign.

In November 1994, Rodham lost to Mack by 1,684,623 votes. Rodham lost in even normally Democratic areas such as Broward County.

After the election, Rubin switched allegiance again and charged Rodham with election law violations in the first primary. The Federal Election Commission eventually dismissed the allegations.

Rodham then had some involvement in Broward County politics, supporting a candidate for the County Commission who lost. He subsequently tried to unseat the Dade County Democratic Party Chairman; after badly losing that race, he disappeared from the Florida political scene.

== Return to law ==
After losing the Senate race, Rodham returned to law, while also trying his hand at hosting a syndicated talk radio show around 1996. The radio show failed to find an audience. During 1995 through 1997 Rodham started working on a very large tobacco lawsuit with other attorneys; observers were puzzled as to Rodham's involvement, given his limited experience in the area, and speculated that influence peddling might be the reason. The massive case eventually failed to gain Congressional approval, but by one report a 2002 settlement involved in it made Rodham financially secure.

In 1999, Hugh and brother Tony Rodham entered into a $118 million venture to grow and export hazelnuts from the Republic of Georgia. The U.S. State Department and National Security Advisor Sandy Berger became upset, however, when the Rodhams' local business connection in Batumi turned out to be Aslan Abashidze, a major political opponent of Georgian President Eduard Shevardnadze, then a key U.S. ally in the region. After initial resistance, Berger and the Clintons prevailed upon the Rodham brothers to drop the deal. Hugh Rodham stated that he was only acting as a lawyer for the venture and did not have money invested in it.

Episodes such as these led Hillary Clinton's White House staff to refer to Hugh and Tony as "the Brothers Rodham", extending the American tradition of troublesome presidential siblings to the brother-in-law category; one senior White House official would be quoted as saying, "You never wanted to hear their name come up in any context other than playing golf."

As the Clinton administration came to a close in early 2001, it was discovered that Hugh Rodham received around $400,000 for legal services regarding gaining the Presidential pardon of businessman Glenn Braswell who had been convicted of fraud, and the sentence commutation of drug trafficker Carlos Vignali. While legal experts said that Rodham may well not have done anything wrong, the appearance of possible impropriety certainly existed. Moreover, coming while the Bill Clinton pardons controversy was already in full force, this was a further embarrassment for the former administration and even got the attention of the Congressional House Committee on Oversight and Government Reform. Hillary Clinton, now a newly-sworn-in Senator, said, "He's my brother. I love my brother ... I'm just extremely disappointed in this terrible misjudgment that he made ... I knew nothing about my brother's involvement in these pardons. I knew nothing about his taking money for his involvement." Both Clintons pressured Rodham to return the $400,000, which he promptly did. During this time, Rodham additionally collected media criticism for being overweight and a poor dresser. By 2001 he was working in the law firm of Rodham & Fine in downtown Fort Lauderdale.

Subsequently, Rodham stayed out of the public eye. When his sister's 2008 presidential campaign came to the family summer home of Scranton, Pennsylvania, for the state primary, he hosted a reception for campaign workers. By the mid-2010s, he was still working at Rodham & Fine. During the Hillary Clinton presidential campaign, 2016, he and Tony appeared with her at a rally in Scranton in April 2016. But generally he kept a low profile during the campaign and declined to speak to the press.

Party political offices
| Preceded by Buddy MacKay | Democratic nominee for U.S. Senator from Florida (Class 1); 1994 | Succeeded by Bill Nelson |
