= List of University of Florida Levin College of Law graduates =

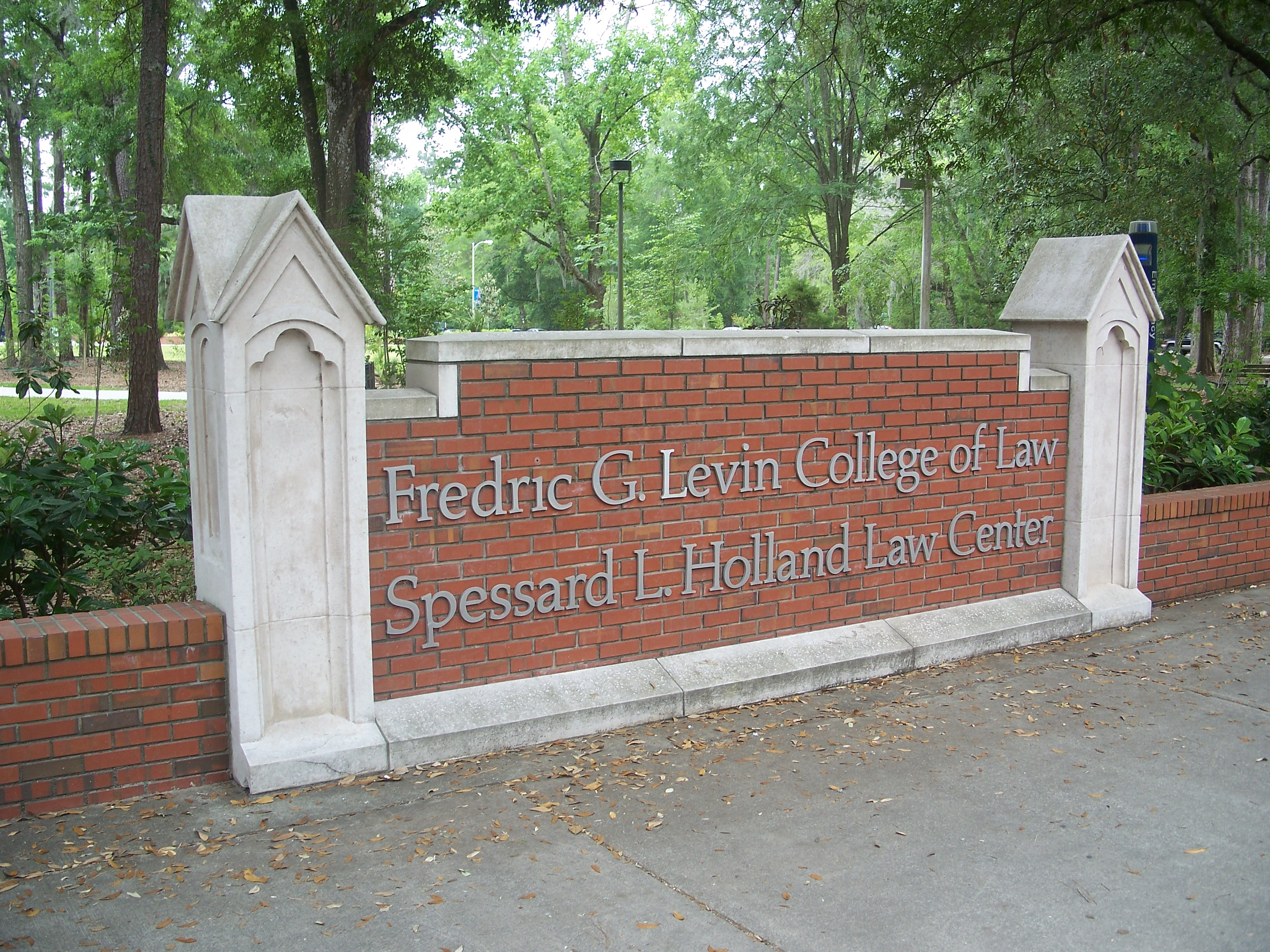
Fredric G. Levin College of Law, established in 1909

This list of University of Florida Levin College of Law graduates includes notable recipients of one or more academic law degrees (LL.B., J.D., LL.M.) from the Levin College of Law, the law school of the University of Florida, located in Gainesville, Florida. (For a list of notable alumni of the University of Florida's other academic divisions, see list of University of Florida alumni.)

== Government ==
=== United States senators ===
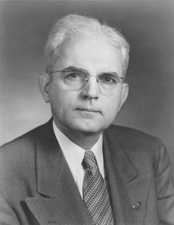
Spessard Holland

Alumni	Notability
Charles O. Andrews	U.S. senator (1936–46)
Lawton Chiles	U.S. senator (1971–89)
Spessard Holland	U.S. senator (1946–71)
Ashley Moody	U.S. senator (2025–present)
George Smathers	U.S. senator (1951–69)

=== United States representatives ===
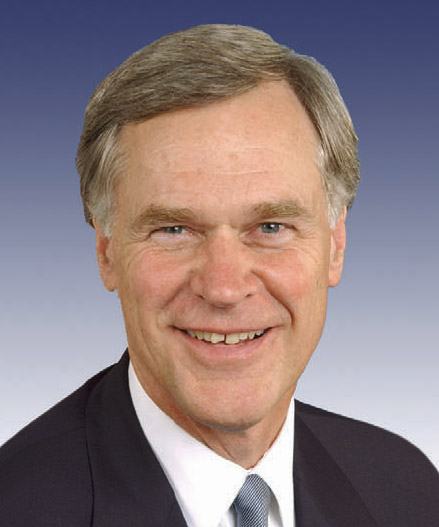
Ander Crenshaw

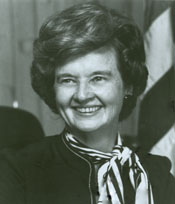
Marjorie Holt

Alumni	Notability
Charles Edward Bennett	U.S. representative (1949–93)
Michael Bilirakis	U.S. representative (1983–2007)
Bill Chappell	U.S. representative (1969–89)
Ander Crenshaw	U.S. representative (2001–2017)
Jim Davis	U.S. representative (1997–2007)
Sam Gibbons	U.S. representative (1963–97)
Syd Herlong	U.S. representative (1967–69)
Marjorie Holt	U.S. representative (1973–87)
Harry Johnston	U.S. representative (1989–97)
Bill Lantaff	U.S. representative (1951–55)
Buddy MacKay	U.S. representative (1983–89)
Chester B. McMullen	U.S. representative (1951–53)
J. Hardin Peterson	U.S. representative (1933–51)
Paul Rogers	U.S. representative (1955–79)
Joe Scarborough	U.S. representative (1995–2001); host of Morning Joe (2007–present); former host of Scarborough Country (2003–07)

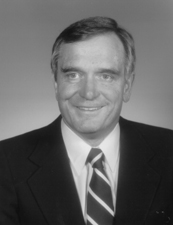
Lawton Chiles

=== Governors ===
Alumni	Notability
Reubin O'Donovan Askew	Governor of Florida (1971–79)
Lawton Chiles	Governor of Florida (1991–98)
Spessard Holland	Governor of Florida (1941–45)
Buddy MacKay	Governor of Florida (1998–99)

== Judiciary ==
=== United States Court of Appeals judges ===
Alumni	Notability
Rosemary Barkett	United States Court of Appeals for the Eleventh Circuit (1994–2013)
Susan H. Black	United States Court of Appeals for the Eleventh Circuit (1992–2011, senior judge 2011–present)
Peter T. Fay	United States Court of Appeals for the Fifth Circuit (1976–81), (Note: Originally covered by the Fifth Circuit (responsible for six contiguous states from Texas to Florida), the Eleventh Circuit was formed on October 1, 1981, taking over responsibility for the three easternmost of the Fifth Circuit states (Alabama, Florida and Georgia).) United States Court of Appeals for the Eleventh Circuit (1981–94, senior judge 1994–2021)
Robert J. Luck	United States Court of Appeals for the Eleventh Circuit (2019–present)
S. Jay Plager	United States Court of Appeals for the Federal Circuit (1989–2000, senior judge 2000–present)
John M. Bryan Simpson	United States Court of Appeals for the Fifth Circuit (1966–1975, senior judge 1975–1981), United States Court of Appeals for the Eleventh Circuit (senior judge 1981–1987)

=== United States District Court judges ===
Alumni	District	Years of service	Prior position
Winston Arnow	United States District Court for the Northern District of Florida	1967–94 (presided over the Gainesville Eight trial)	Private practice
Sidney Aronovitz	United States District Court for the Southern District of Florida	1976–97	Miami city commissioner
C. Clyde Atkins	United States District Court for the Southern District of Florida	1966–99	Private practice
John L. Badalamenti	United States District Court for the Middle District of Florida	2020–present	DCA judge
William J. Barker	United States District Court for the Southern District of Florida	1966–99	Circuit court judge
William J. Castagna	United States District Court for the Middle District of Florida	1979–92	Private practice
Anne C. Conway	United States District Court for the Middle District of Florida	1991–present	Private practice
Roy B. Dalton Jr.	United States District Court for the Middle District of Florida	2011–present	Private practice
Brian J. Davis	United States District Court for the Middle District of Florida	2013–present	Circuit court judge
Edward B. Davis	United States District Court for the Southern District of Florida	1979–2000	Private practice
William Dimitrouleas	United States District Court for the Southern District of Florida	1998–present	Public defender, state attorney
Joe Oscar Eaton	United States District Court for the Southern District of Florida	1982–2008	Circuit court judge
Patricia C. Fawsett	United States District Court for the Middle District of Florida	1986–present	Private practice
Jose A. Gonzalez, Jr.	United States District Court for the Southern District of Florida	1978–96	Circuit court judge
William Terrell Hodges	United States District Court for the Middle District of Florida	1971–present	Private practice
Charlene Honeywell	United States District Court for the Middle District of Florida	2009–present	Circuit court judge
Marcia Morales Howard	United States District Court for the Middle District of Florida	2007–present	Private practice
Paul Huck	United States District Court for the Southern District of Florida	2000–present	Private practice
James W. Kehoe	United States District Court for the Southern District of Florida	1979–98	Circuit court judge
James Lawrence King	United States District Court for the Southern District of Florida	1970–present	Circuit court judge
Ben Krentzman	United States District Court for the Middle District of Florida	1967–98	Private practice
Richard A. Lazzara	United States District Court for the Middle District of Florida	1997–present	DCA judge
William McRae	United States District Court for the Middle District of Florida	1962–73	Private practice
William O. Mehrtens	United States District Court for the Southern District of Florida	1965–75	Private practice
Howell W. Melton	United States District Court for the Middle District of Florida	1977–2015	Circuit court judge
Steven D. Merryday	United States District Court for the Middle District of Florida	1992–present	Private practice
Stephan P. Mickle	United States District Court for the Northern District of Florida	1998–present	Circuit court judge
David L. Middlebrooks	United States District Court for the Northern District of Florida	1969–74	Private practice
Donald M. Middlebrooks	United States District Court for the Southern District of Florida	1997–present	General counsel to Florida Governor Reubin O'Donovan Askew
Kathryn Kimball Mizelle	United States District Court for the Southern District of Florida	2020–present	Private practice
James S. Moody, Jr.	United States District Court for the Middle District of Florida	2000–present	Circuit court judge
Ralph Wilson Nimmons, Jr.	United States District Court for the Middle District of Florida	1991–2003	Circuit court judge
Maurice M. Paul	United States District Court for the Northern District of Florida	1982–2016	Circuit court judge
Gregory A. Presnell	United States District Court for the Middle District of Florida	2000–present	Private practice
John Richard Smoak, Jr.	United States District Court for the Northern District of Florida	2005–present	Private practice
Eugene P. Spellman	United States District Court for the Southern District of Florida	1979–91	State attorney, private practice
Ursula Mancusi Ungaro-Benages	United States District Court for the Southern District of Florida	1992–present	Circuit court judge
Mark E. Walker	United States District Court for the Northern District of Florida	2012–present	Circuit court judge
George Whitehurst	United States District Court for the Southern District of Florida	1950–61	Circuit court judge
Allen C. Winsor	United States District Court for the Northern District of Florida	2019–present	DCA judge
George C. Young	United States District Court for the Middle District of Florida	1962–2015	Private practice

=== Florida Supreme Court ===
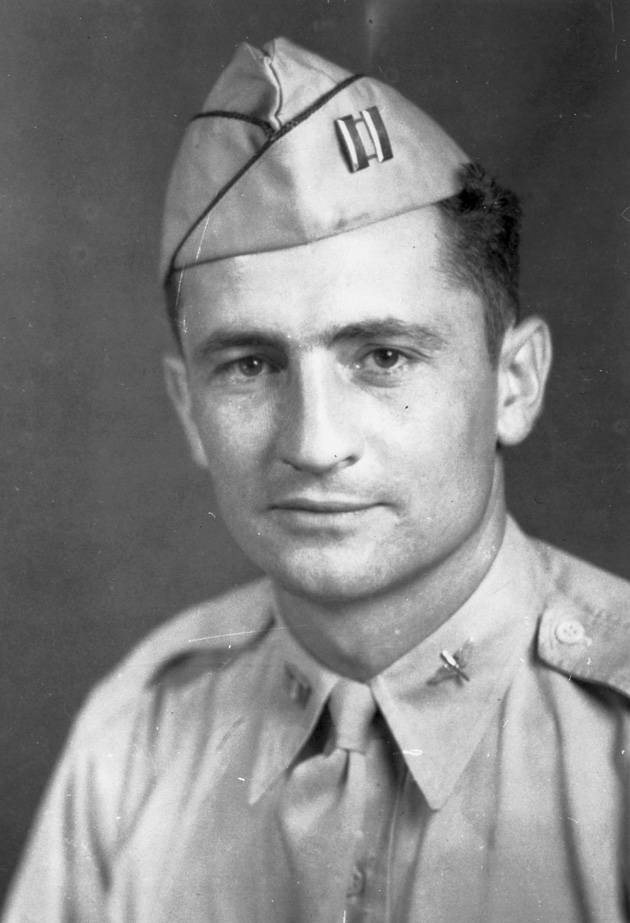
Stephen C. O'Connell

Alumni	Notability
Alto Adams	Florida Supreme Court (1940–51), chief justice (1949–51)
James C. Adkins	Florida Supreme Court (1969–87), chief justice (1974–76)
Harry Lee Anstead	Florida Supreme Court (1994–2009), chief justice (2002–04)
Raymond Ehrlich	Florida Supreme Court (1981–90), chief justice (1988–90)
Richard Ervin	Florida Supreme Court (1964–75), chief justice (1969–71)
Stephen H. Grimes	Florida Supreme Court (1987–96), chief justice (1994–96)
Jorge Labarga	Florida Supreme Court (2009–present), chief justice (2014–present)
Parker Lee McDonald	Florida Supreme Court (1979–94), chief justice (1986–88)
Stephen C. O'Connell	Florida Supreme Court (1955–67), chief justice (1967)
Ben F. Overton	Florida Supreme Court (1974–99), chief justice (1976–78)
Harold Sebring	Florida Supreme Court (1943–55), chief justice (1951–53)
B. Campbell Thornal	Florida Supreme Court (1955–70), chief justice (1965–67)
Charles T. Wells	Florida Supreme Court (1994–2009), chief justice (2000–02)

== Political figures ==
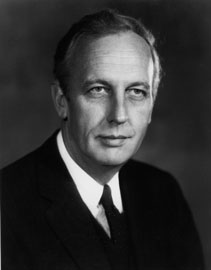
Lucius Battle

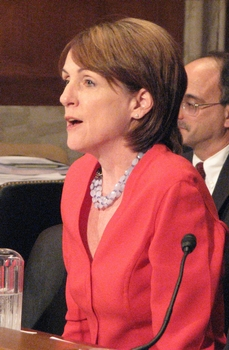
Carol Browner

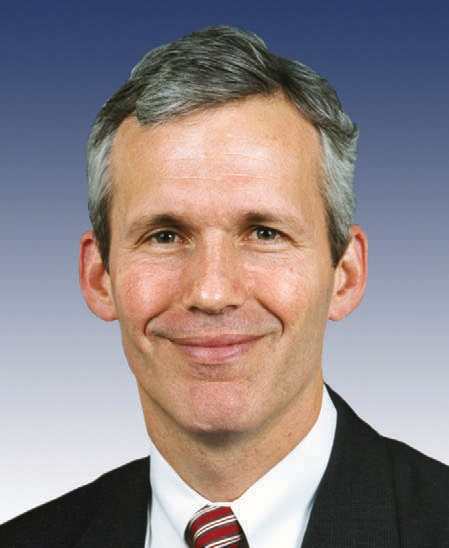
Jim Davis

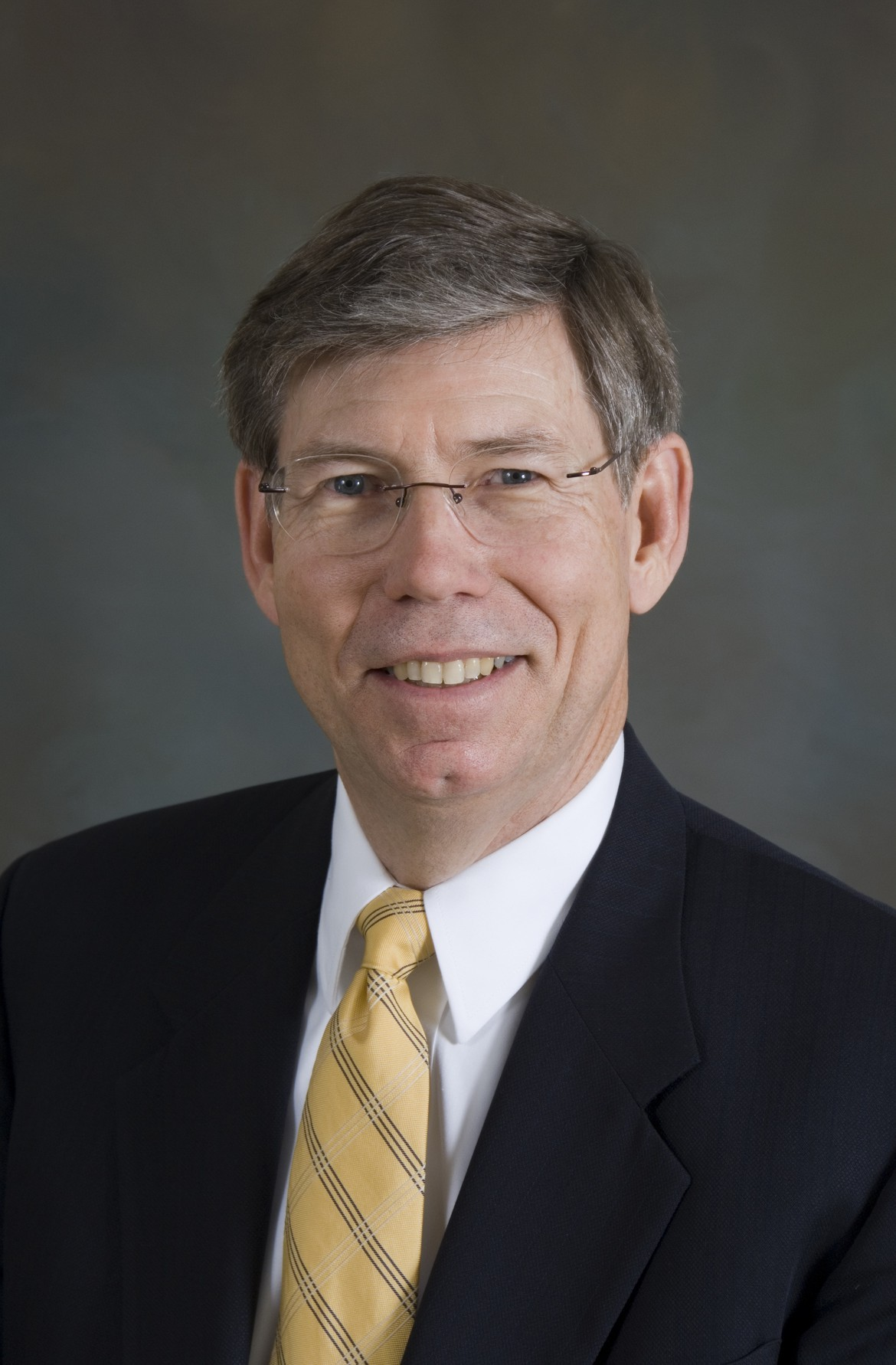
Bill McCollum

Alumni	Notability
Reubin O'Donovan Askew	United States trade representative (1979–81), candidate for president of the United States in 1984
DuBose Ausley	Chairman of the Florida Board of Regents (1981–83)
Ed Austin	Mayor of Jacksonville (1991–95)
Lucius D. Battle	U.S. ambassador to Egypt (1964–67)
Carol Browner	EPA administrator (1993–2001); director of White House Office of Energy and Climate Change Policy (2009–present)
Ferrin Campbell	Florida House of Representatives (1951–1955), Florida Senate (1963–1965)
Skip Campbell	Florida Senate (1998–2006)
Jim Davis	Candidate for governor of Florida (2006)
John Delaney	Mayor of Jacksonville (1995–2003)
Paul Rand Dixon	Chairman of Federal Trade Commission (1961–69)
Buddy Dyer	Mayor of Orlando (2003–present)
Richard Ervin	Florida attorney general (1949–64)
Mark S. Fowler	Chairman of Federal Communications Commission (1981–87)
Dan Gelber	Florida Senate (2008–present)
*J. Dudley Goodlette	Politician and lawyer
Baya M. Harrison Jr.	Desegregated the State University System of Florida
Mallory Horne	President of Florida Senate (1973–74)
Jeff Kottkamp	Lieutenant governor of Florida (2007–11)
James W. Kynes	Florida attorney general (1964–65)
Buddy Mackay	Lieutenant governor of Florida (1991–98)
Bill McBride	Candidate for governor of Florida (2002)
Bill McCollum	Florida attorney general (2007–11)
Jose Rodriguez Jr.	Director of the National Clandestine Service (2004–07)
Frederick H. Schultz	Vice chairman of Federal Reserve System (1979–82)
Bruce Smathers	Florida secretary of state (1975–78)
Rod Smith	Florida Senate (2000–06), candidate for governor of Florida (2006)
Francis Suarez	Mayor of Miami (2017–present)
Donald L. Tucker	Special U.S. ambassador to the Dominican Republic
Craig Waters	Spokesman for Florida Supreme Court during 2000 presidential election controversy

== Academic administrators ==
=== College and university presidents ===
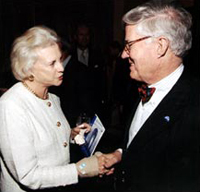
Sandy D'Alemberte

Alumni	Notability
George F. Baughman	New College of Florida (1960–65)
Marshall Criser	University of Florida (1984–89)
Harold Crosby	University of West Florida (1964–74); Florida International University (1976–79)
Sandy D'Alemberte	Florida State University (1994–2003)
John Delaney	University of North Florida (2003–present); chancellor of the State University System of Florida
Ray F. Ferrero Jr.	Nova Southeastern University (1997–2009)
Robert Lindgren	Randolph-Macon College (2006–present)
Stephen C. O'Connell	University of Florida (1967–73)
W. Reece Smith, Jr.	University of South Florida (1976–77)

== American Bar Association ==
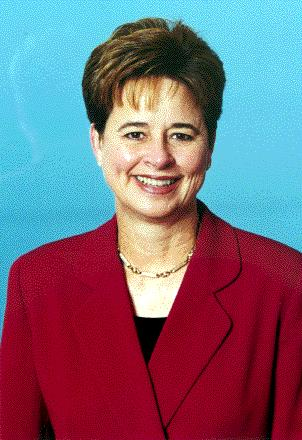
Martha Barnett

Alumni	Notability
Martha Barnett	President of the American Bar Association (2000–01)
Sandy D'Alemberte	President of the American Bar Association (1991–92)
Chesterfield Smith	President of the American Bar Association (1973–74)
W. Reece Smith, Jr.	President of the American Bar Association (1980–81)
Stephen N. Zack	President of the American Bar Association (2010–11)

== Attorneys ==
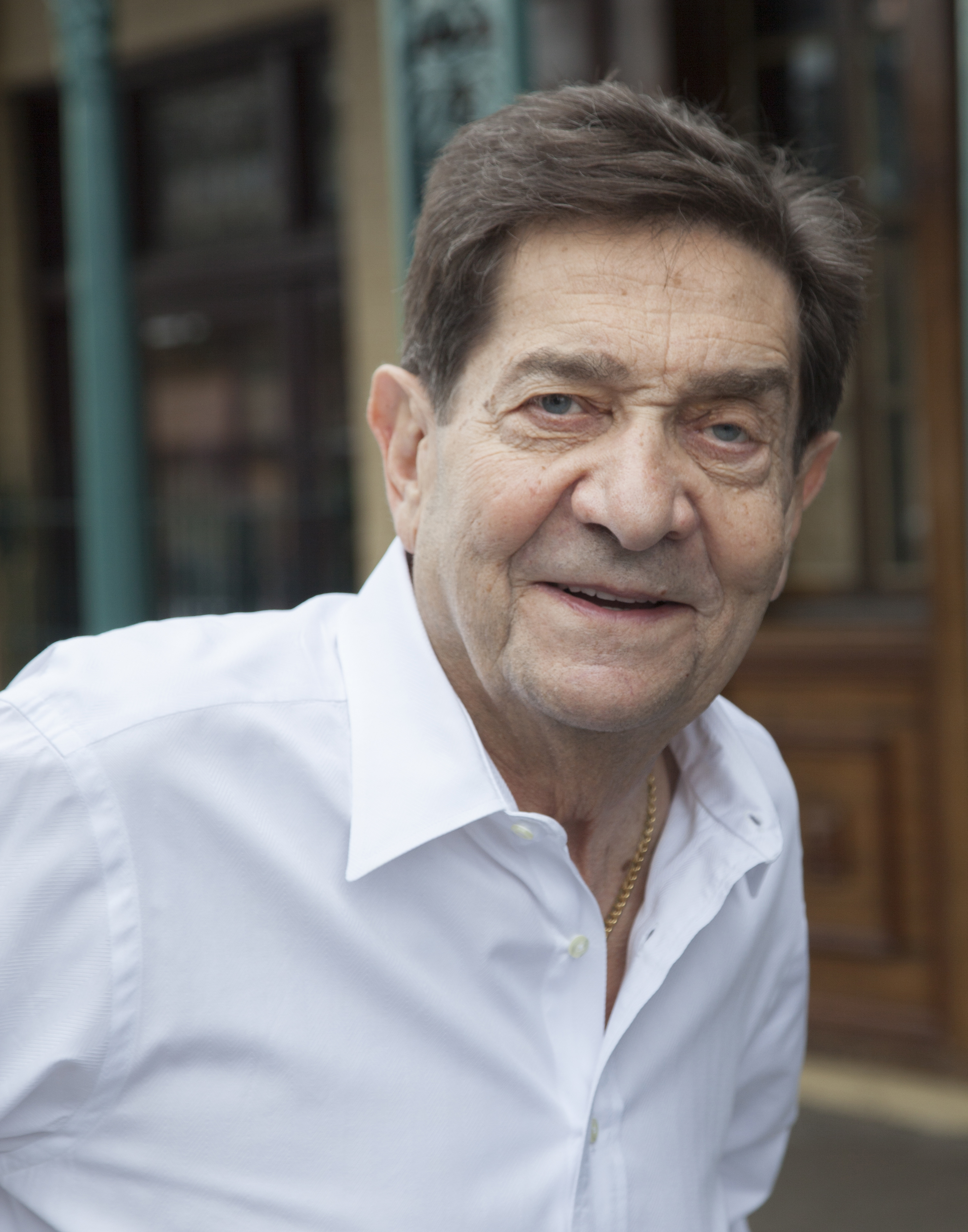
Fred Levin

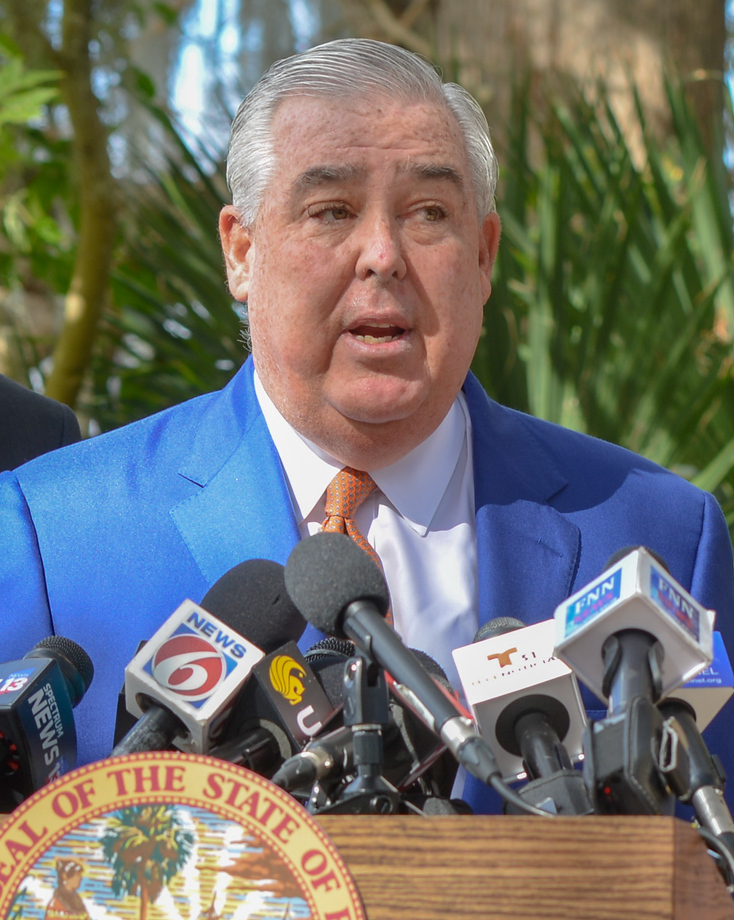
John Morgan

Alumni	Notability
James Bopp	Conservative lawyer
Stumpy Harris	Eminent domain lawyer and major donor and supporter of the Florida Gators
Charlie Gray	Central Florida attorney, civic leader, and co-founder of the GrayRobinson law firm, widely celebrated as the "Grandfather of the University of Central Florida" (UCF).
Scott Novell	Attorney, CPA, and business executive who co-founded Payroll Plus and the Golf Channel Academy, and served as Chief Counsel/COO for Rotech Healthcare.
Fred Levin	Namesake of the Levin College of Law; prominent figure in tobacco litigation; co-founded (1955) Levin Papantonio Law Firm
Howell W. Melton Jr.	Current managing partner of Holland & Knight
John Morgan	Current attorney and founder of Morgan & Morgan personal injury firm
Dorothy Clay Sims	Successfully defended Casey Anthony; expert cross-examiner
Rod Smith	Successfully prosecuted Danny Rolling; former candidate for Governor of Florida

== Miscellaneous ==
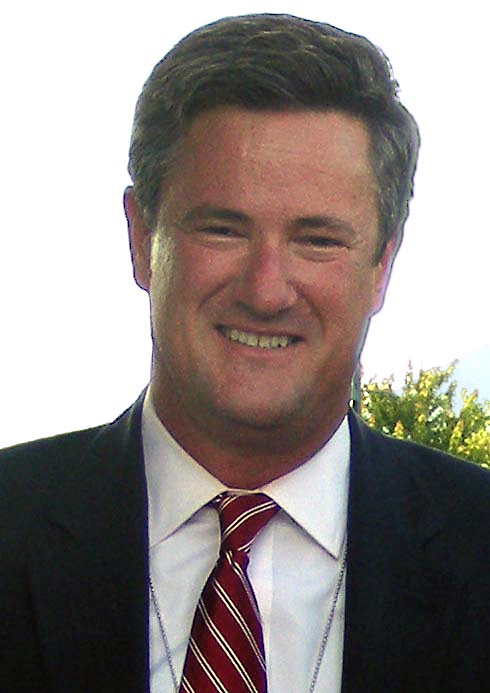
Joe Scarborough

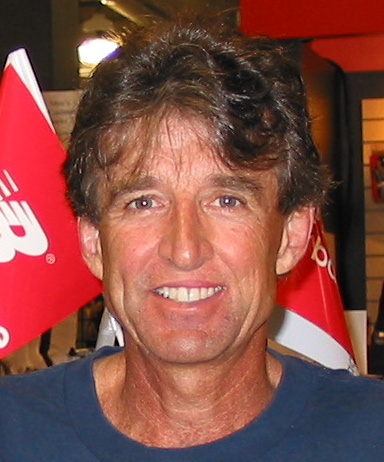
Frank Shorter

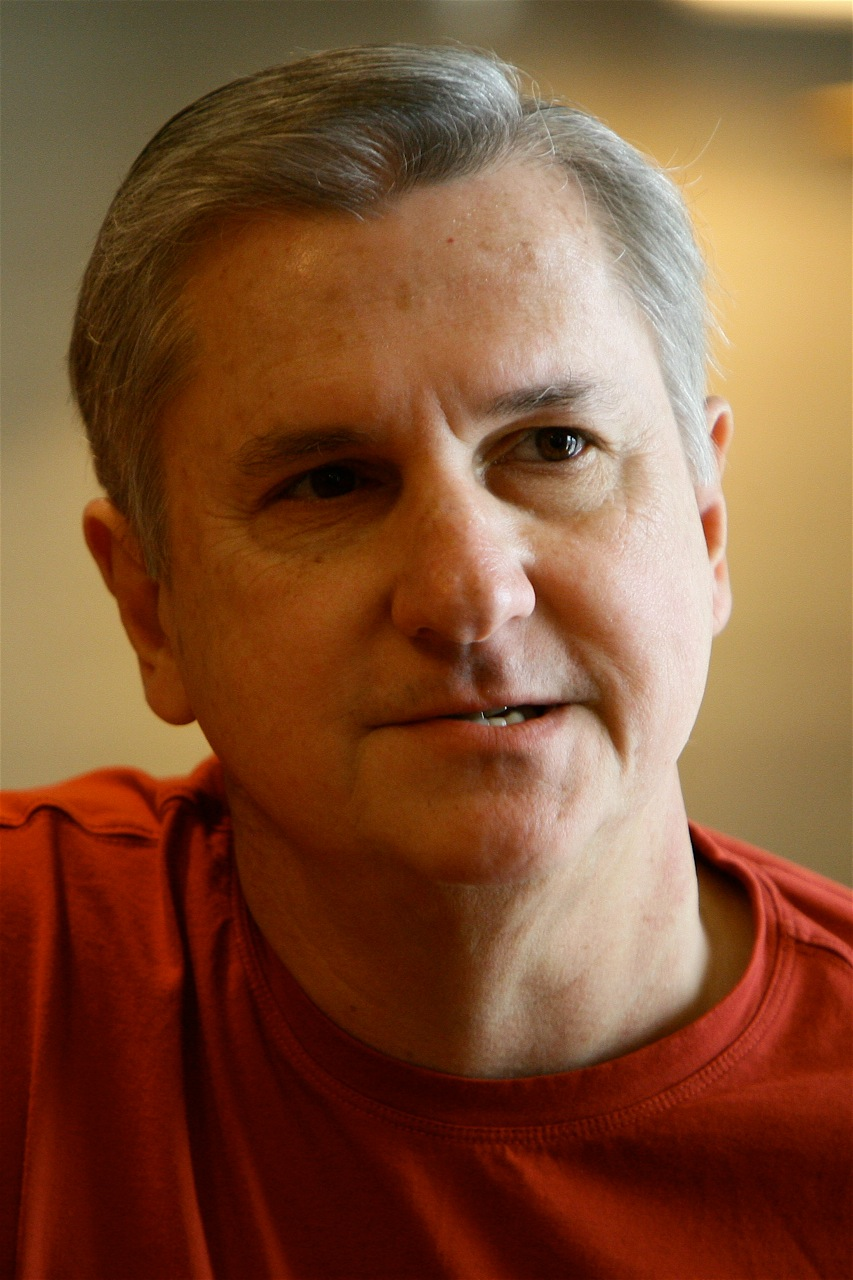
Terry Smiljanich

Alumni	Notability
Philip Agee	Operative for the Central Intelligence Agency (1960–1968), author of Inside the Company: CIA Diary
John F. Bolt	United States Marine Corps pilot (1941–1962), awarded the Navy Cross; after USMC, enrolled (with his son) and graduated Florida College of Law
Dana Bullen	Director of the Press Freedom Committee (1981–96), foreign editor of The Washington Star
John J. Considine	Senior minister for the Unity Church (1998–present); member of Florida House of Representatives
Brad Culpepper	NFL football player (1992–2000) with the Minnesota Vikings, Tampa Bay Buccaneers and Chicago Bears
J. J. Daniel	Publisher of The Florida Times-Union (1976–82)
Charles W. Dorman	Marine Corps brigadier general (1974–2006); chief judge for the Navy-Marine Corps Court of Criminal Appeals
Richard Grayson	Writer, political activist, and performance artist
George Greer	Florida Sixth Circuit Court judge (1992–2010) who presided over the Terri Schiavo case; county commissioner for Pinellas County (1984–1992)
James Grippando	Lawyer and writer, including legal/scholarly (1989–2008) and fiction (1994–present)
Edgar C. Jones	University of Florida athletic director (1930–36), Florida Gators football player (1923–25)
Lewis Landes	United States Army colonel (action in WWI and WWII) and lawyer
Maud Newton	Writer, blogger and book reviewer (born 1971)
John L. Parker, Jr.	Florida Gators track and field runner (1966–1972), author including Once a Runner (1978)
Howard Roffman	President of Lucas Licensing, a subsidiary of Lucasfilm (1999–2012, senior advisor thereafter)
Harold Sebring	Head coach of Florida Gators football team (1925–27), judge at Nuremberg Trials (1946–47), dean of Stetson University College of Law (1955–68)
Leland C. Shepard Jr.	United States Air Force brigadier general, served in World War II, Korean War, Vietnam War
Frank Shorter	Chairman of United States Anti-Doping Agency, Olympic marathon gold medalist at 1972 Summer Olympics
Terry Smiljanich	Counsel for the United States Senate in 1987 Iran–Contra Hearings, co-founder (1983) of James, Hoyer, Newcomer & Smiljanich, P.A.
Mac Stipanovich	Republican lobbyist who had a large role in the 2000 Florida recount
