= List of Florida Blue Key members =

Florida Blue Key is a student leadership honor society at the University of Florida. It was the founding chapter of the national Blue Key Honor Society in 1923, but later withdrew and operates as a local organization. Florida Blue Key members include many politicians, judges, and university presidents. Its members live across the United States.

== Academia ==
Name	Notability	Ref.
Frank Brogan	Chancellor of the State University System of Florida, president of Florida Atlantic University, and 15th Lt. Governor of Florida	
Marshall Criser	President of the University of Florida	
Sandy D'Alemberte	President of Florida State University, president of the American Bar Association, and Florida House of Representatives	
Albert A. Murphree	President of Florida State College and University of Florida	
Stephen C. O'Connell	President of the University of Florida and chief justice of the Florida Supreme Court	
J. Wayne Reitz	President of the University of Florida	
James F. Rinehart	Chair of the Department of Political Science and Dean of the College of Arts and Sciences of Troy University	

== Business ==
Name	Notability	Ref.
Phil Graham	Former publisher and co-owner of The Washington Post	
Julia L. Johnson	FirstEnergy board of directors, president of NetCommunications, and Florida Public Service Commission	
Alfred C. Warrington	Accountant and business executive	

== Law ==
Name	Notability	Ref.
Martha Barnett	Attorney, second female president of the American Bar Association	
Beth Bloom	federal judge of the United States District Court for the Southern District of Florida	
Sandy D'Alemberte	President of the American Bar Association, president of Florida State University, and Florida House of Representatives	
Dexter Douglass	Lawyer for Al Gore in the Florida recount case and general counsel to Florida Governor Lawton Chiles	
Raymond Ehrlich	Former justice to the Florida Supreme Court	
Jose Alejandro Gonzalez Jr.	Senior judge of the US District Court for the Southern District of Florida	
Stephen H. Grimes	Chief justice to the Florida Supreme Court	
Stumpy Harris	Attorney, donor and supporter to the Florida Gators	
James Lawrence King	Senior judge of the US District Court for the Southern District of Florida	
Mark W. Klingensmith	chief judge of the Florida 4th District Court of Appeal	
James W. Kynes	Florida Attorney General and professional football player	
Bill McCollum	Florida Attorney General and U.S. Representative	
Chad Mizelle	acting general counsel of the US Department of Homeland Security	
Kathryn Kimball Mizelle	District judge for the US District Court for the Middle District of Florida	
James S. Moody Jr.	Senior judge of the US District Court for the Middle District of Florida	
John Morgan	Attorney, head of the country's largest personal injury law firm	
Stephen C. O'Connell	Chief justice of the Florida Supreme Court and president of the University of Florida	
Peggy Quince	justice of the Florida Supreme Court	
Harold Sebring	Member of the Subsequent Nuremberg Trials tribunal, chief justice of the Florida Supreme Court, and head coach of Florida Gators football	
Robert Shevin	Florida Attorney General, judge, Florida Senate, and Florida House of Representatives	
Chesterfield Smith	Holland & Knight founder and president of the American Bar Association	
W. Reece Smith Jr.	President of the International Bar Association and president of the American Bar Association	
William Glenn Terrell	Florida Supreme Court justice, Florida House of Representatives, and Florida Senate	
B. Campbell Thornal	Former justice to the Florida Supreme Court	
Charles T. Wells	Florida Supreme Court justice	
Stephen N. Zack	President of the American Bar Association, attorney in Bush v. Gore	

== Politics ==
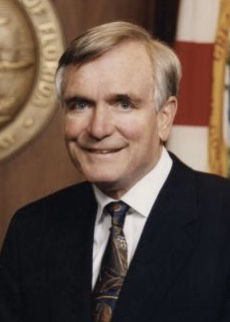
Lawton Chiles

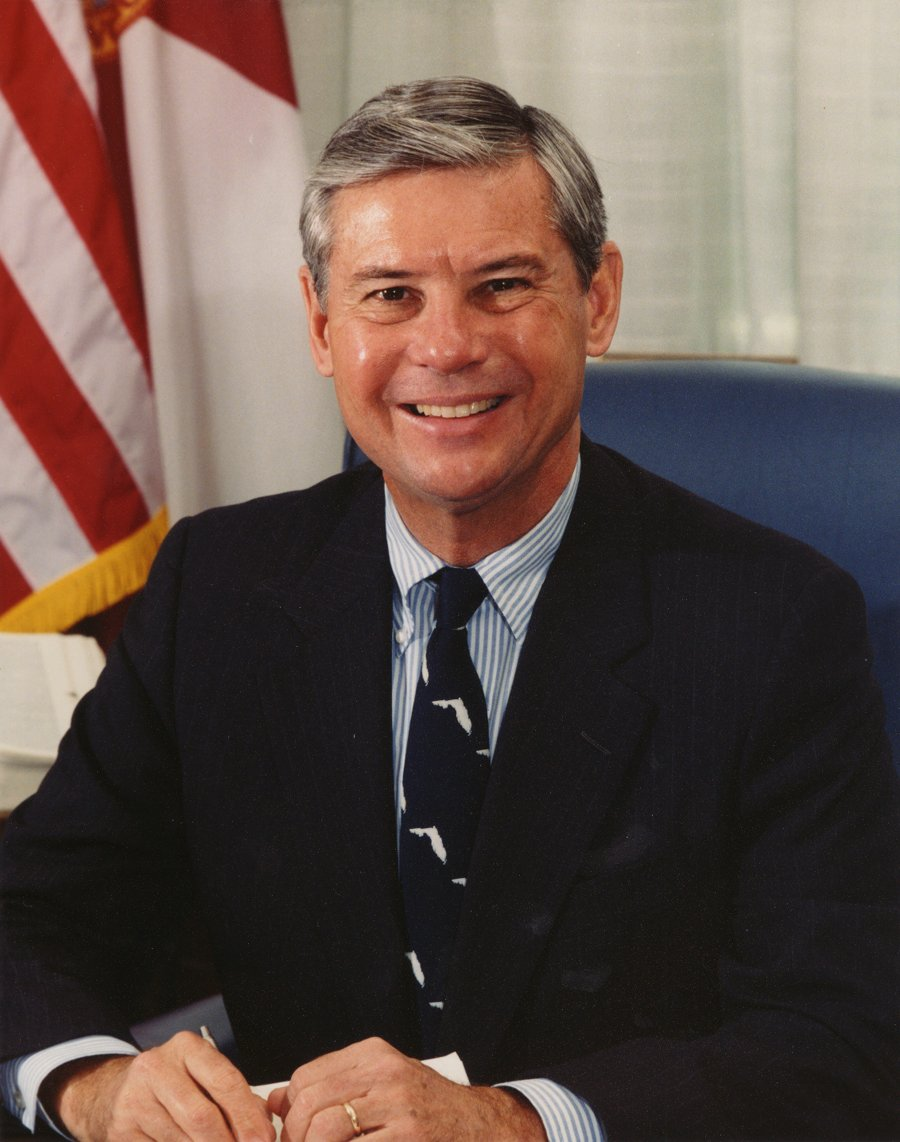
Bob Graham

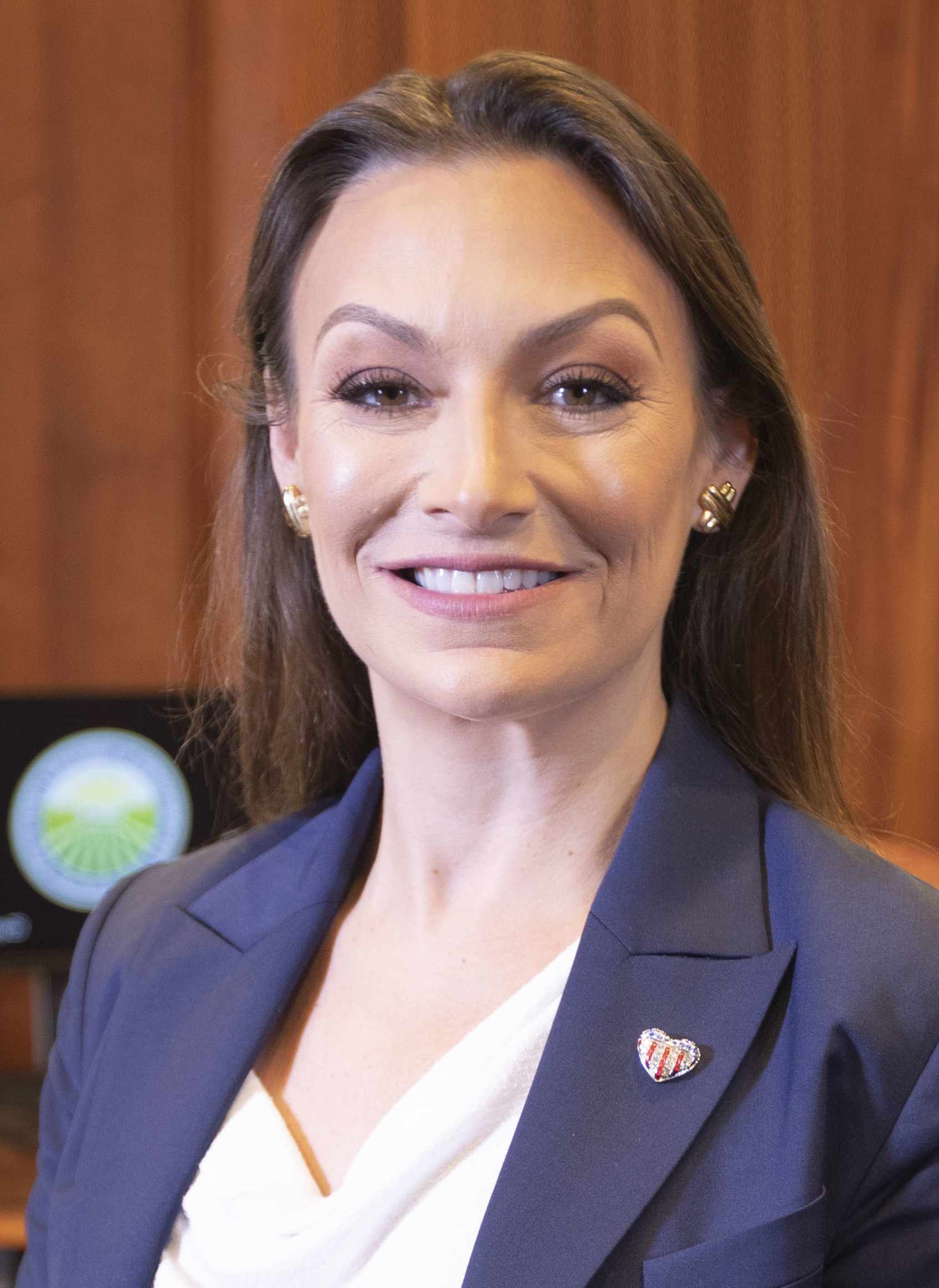
Nikki Fried

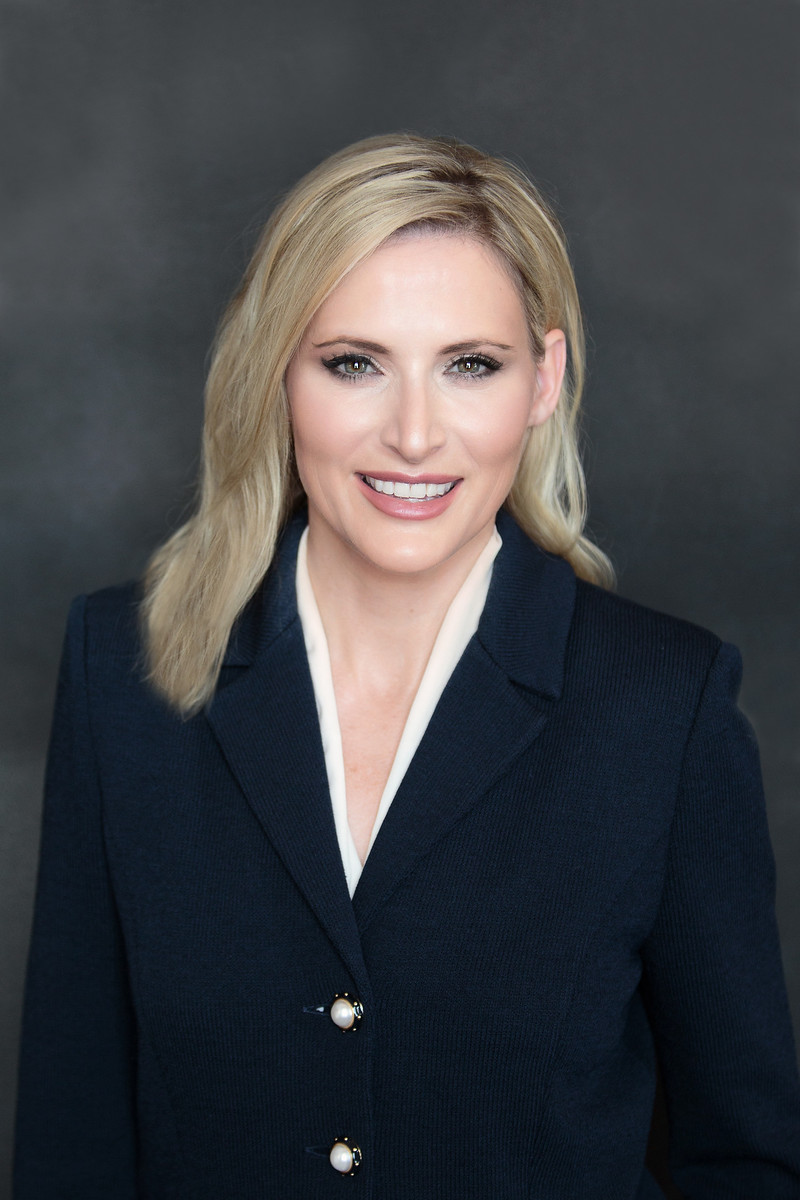
Laurel Lee

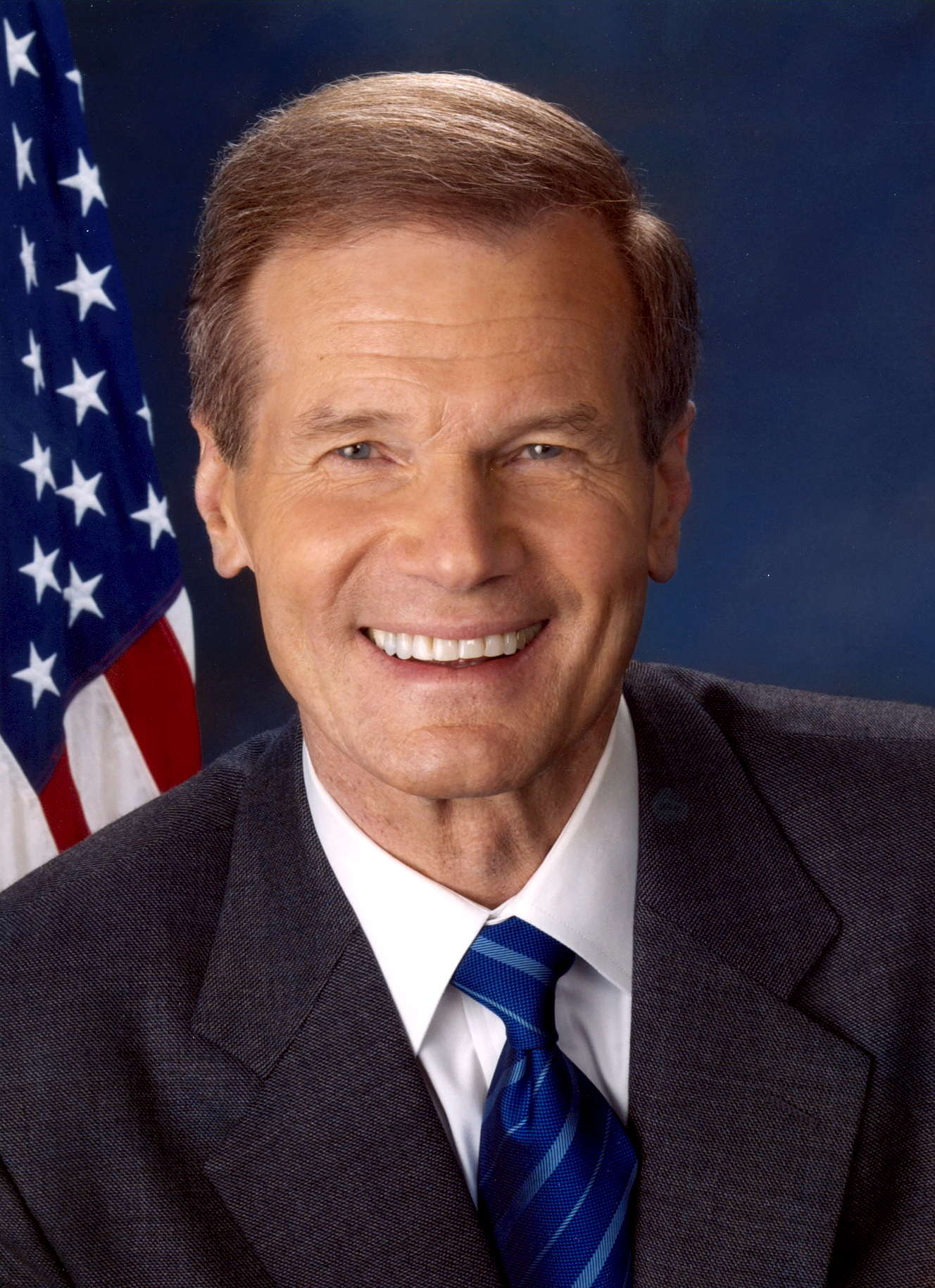
Bill Nelson

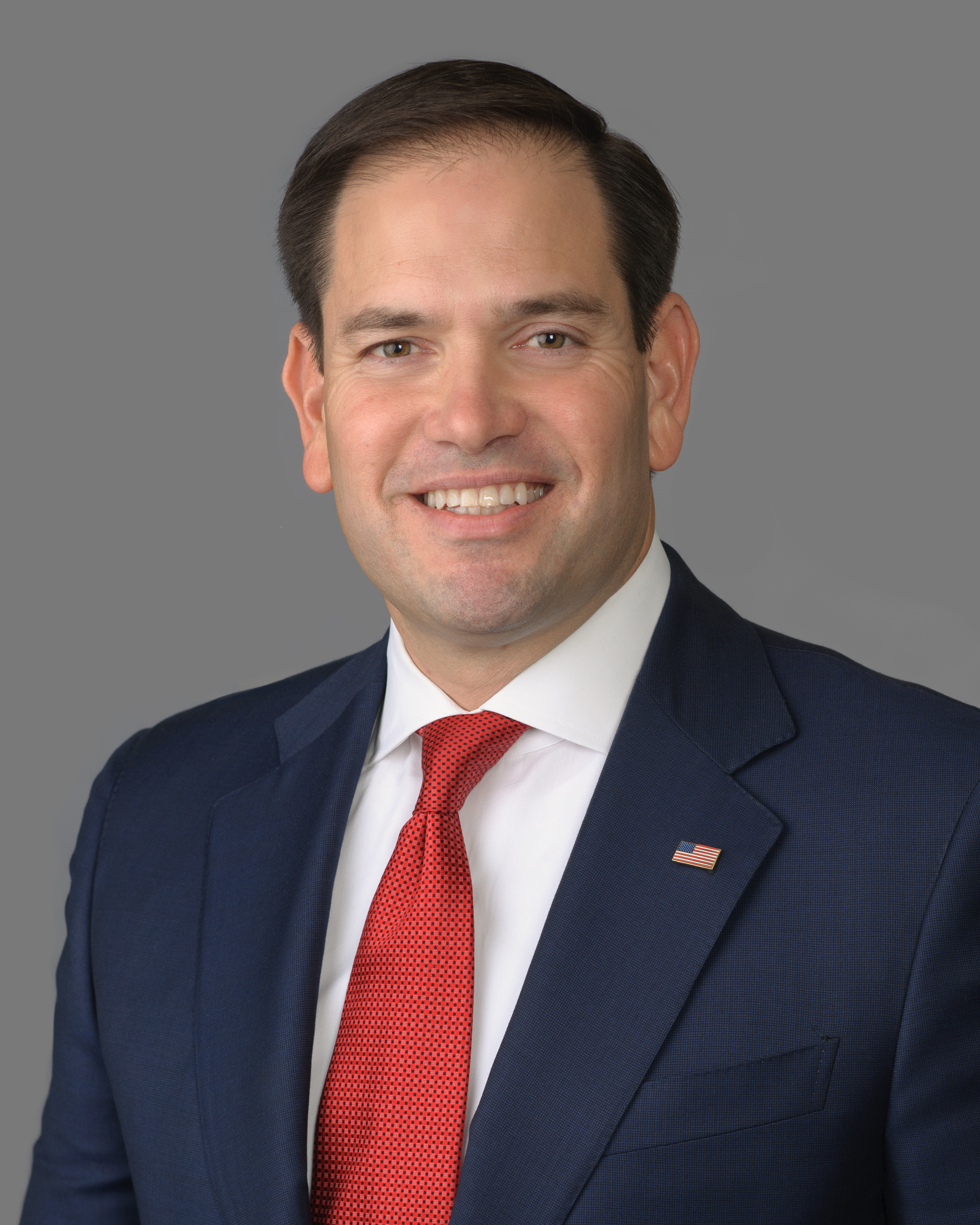
Marco Rubio

Name	Notability	Ref.
Reubin Askew	Governor of Florida and United States Trade Representative	
Bill Birchfield	Florida House of Representatives	
Jason Brodeur	Florida House of Representatives	
Frank Brogan	15th Lt. Governor of Florida, chancellor of the State University System of Florida, and president of Florida Atlantic University	
J. Hyatt Brown	Speaker of the Florida House of Representatives	
Julie Imanuel Brown	Chairman and commissioner of the Florida Public Service Commission	
Lawton Chiles	41st Florida Governor and former U.S. Senator	
Chuck Clemons	Florida House of Representatives	
Sandy D'Alemberte	Florida House of Representatives, president of Florida State University, and president of the American Bar Association	
Rick Dantzler	Florida executive director of the Farm Service Agency, Florida Senate, and Florida House of Representatives	
Ben Diamond	Florida House of Representatives	
Chris Dorworth	Florida House of Representatives	
Dan Eagle	Florida Secretary of the Florida Department of Economic Opportunity and Florida House of Representatives	
Nikki Fried	Florida Commissioner of Agriculture and Florida Democratic Party chair	
Bob Graham	38th Governor of Florida, U.S. Senator, and founder of the Bob Graham Center for Public Service	
Ben Hill Griffin	Citrus magnate and state legislator	
William Hamilton	Democratic political consultant and pollster	
Spessard Holland	28th Governor of Florida	
Ed Jennings	Florida House of Representatives	
Toni Jennings	16th Lieutenant governor of Florida, Florida House of Representatives, and Florida Senate	
Dave Kerner	executive director of Florida Department of Highway Safety and Motor Vehicles, Florida House of Representatives and mayor of Palm Beach County	
Jeff Kottkamp	lieutenant governor of Florida and Florida House of Representatives	
Laurel Lee	Secretary of State of Florida and U.S. Congressman	
Connie Mack III	U.S. Senator and U.S. Congressman	
Buddy MacKay	42nd governor of Florida, lieutenant governor, and U.S. Congressman	
Bill McBride	Candidate for governor of Florida against Jeb Bush	
Bill McCollum	U.S. Representative and Florida Attorney General	
Perry McGriff	Florida House of Representatives and mayor of Gainesville	
John Mica	U.S. House of Representatives	
Jeff Miller	U.S. House of Representatives	
Katie Miller	White House communications director	
Ashley Moody	U.S. Senator from Florida	
Bill Nelson	U.S. Senator, U.S. Representative, and NASA astronaut	
Richard A. Pettigrew	Speaker of the Florida House of Representatives	
Adam Putnam	Florida Commissioner of Agriculture and U.S. Congressman	
Marco Rubio	U.S. Secretary of State, U.S. Senator and speaker of the Florida House of Representatives	
Ron Saunders	Florida House of Representatives	
T. Terrell Sessums	Speaker of the Florida House of Representatives	
Robert Shevin	Florida Attorney General, judge, Florida Senate, and Florida House of Representatives	
George Smathers	United States Senate and United States House of Representatives	
Greg Steube	Florida House of Representatives	
William Glenn Terrell	Florida House of Representatives, Florida Senate, and Florida Supreme Court justice	
Pat Thomas	Florida Senate	
Jacqui Thurlow-Lippisch	politician and author	
Fuller Warren	30th governor of Florida	

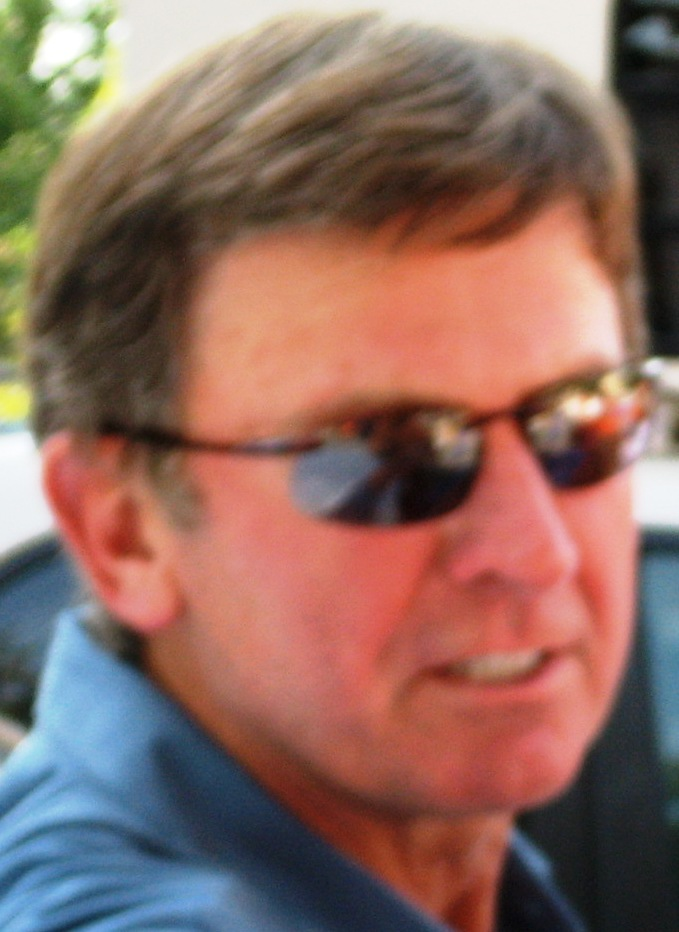
Steve Spurrier

== Sports ==
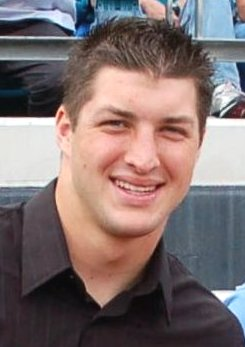
Tim Tebow

Name	Notability	Ref.
James W. Kynes	Florida Attorney General and professional football player	
Harold Sebring	Head coach of Florida Gators football, member of the Subsequent Nuremberg Trials tribunal, and chief justice of the Florida Supreme Court	
Steve Spurrier	Coach for the Florida Gators and coach of the Washington Redskins	
Tim Tebow	football and baseball player, 2007 recipient of the Heisman Trophy	
