= Florida Law Review =

- Discipline: Law
- Language: English

Publication details
- Former name: University of Florida Law Review
- History: 1948–present
- Publisher: Fredric G. Levin College of Law (United States)
- Frequency: Bimonthly

Standard abbreviations
- Bluebook: Fla. L. Rev.
- ISO 4: Fla. Law Rev.

Indexing
- ISSN: 1045-4241
- LCCN: 89656198
- OCLC no.: 803170707

Links
- Journal homepage; Online archive; Alternative archive

The Florida Law Review is a bimonthly law review published by the University of Florida's Fredric G. Levin College of Law. The journal was established in 1948 as the University of Florida Law Review and it assumed its current name in 1989. It is produced by about ninety student editors and a staff editor. The journal publishes articles, essays, and lectures.

== Abstracting and indexing ==
The journal is abstracted and indexed in HeinOnline and WestLaw.

== Notable alumni ==
Some notable alumni of the journal include:

=== Jurists ===
Name	Position
Susan H. Black	Senior United States Circuit Judge of the United States Court of Appeals for the Eleventh Circuit
Peter T. Fay	Senior United States Circuit Judge of the United States Court of Appeals for the Eleventh Circuit
Robert J. Luck	Judge on the United States Court of Appeals for the Eleventh Circuit
William Terrell Hodges	Senior United States District Judge for the Middle District of Florida
James Lawrence King	Senior United States District Judge for the Southern District of Florida
Anne C. Conway	Senior United States District Judge for the Middle District of Florida
Gregory A. Presnell	Senior United States District Judge for the Middle District of Florida
Paul Huck	Senior United States District Judge for the Southern District of Florida
Marcia Morales Howard	United States District Judge for the Middle District of Florida
Steven Douglas Merryday	United States District Judge for the Middle District of Florida
Kathryn Kimball Mizelle	United States District Judge for the Middle District of Florida
Patricia C. Fawsett	Former United States District Judge for the Middle District of Florida
Donald M. Middlebrooks	United States District Judge for the Southern District of Florida
Mark E. Walker	Chief United States District Judge for the Northern District of Florida
Allen Winsor	United States District Judge for the Northern District of Florida
Patricia D. Barksdale	United States Magistrate Judge for the Middle District of Florida
Scott Makar	Judge on the Florida First District Court of Appeal
Stephen H. Grimes	Former Chief Justice of the Florida Supreme Court
S. Jay Plager	Senior United States circuit judge of the United States Court of Appeals for the Federal Circuit
Robert Trask Mann	Former judge for the Florida Second District Court of Appeal and Member of the Florida House of Representatives
Jose Alejandro Gonzalez Jr.	Senior United States District Judge for the Southern District of Florida
Edward B. Davis	Former United States District Judge for the Southern District of Florida
David Lycurgus Middlebrooks Jr.	Former United States District Judge for the Northern District of Florida
Howard W. Brill	Former chief justice of the Arkansas Supreme Court and law professor

=== Politicians ===
Name	Position
Reubin Askew	Former Governor of Florida
Buddy Dyer	Mayor of Orlando, Florida
Jon L. Mills	Former Speaker of the Florida House of Representatives
Ben Diamond	Former Member of the Florida House of Representatives
George Moraitis	Former Member of the Florida House of Representatives
Harold B. Crosby	Founding president of the University of West Florida and second President of Florida International University
Bruce Smathers	18th Secretary of State of Florida and former Florida State Senator
Sandy D'Alemberte	Former President of the American Bar Association and Former President of Florida State University
W. Reece Smith Jr.	Former President of the American Bar Association and Interim President of the University of South Florida
Michael Bilirakis	Former member of the United States House of Representatives

=== Attorneys ===
Name	Position
Chesterfield Smith	Former President of the American Bar Association and founder of Holland & Knight
Martha Barnett	Former President of the American Bar Association
Fred Levin	Noted trial attorney, namesake of the Fredric G. Levin College of Law at the University of Florida
Terry Smiljanich	Counsel to the United States Senate during the congressional hearings on the Iran-Contra affair
Andrew McClurg	Herbert Herff Chair of Excellence in Law at the University of Memphis School of Law
Thomas E. Baker	Founding member of the Florida International University College of Law
Kevin F. O'Brien	Former President of Santa Clara University
Ray F. Ferrero Jr.	Fifth President of Nova Southeastern University and President of The Florida Bar
Craig Waters	Public spokesman for the Florida Supreme Court during the 2000 presidential election controversy
