= Charles Dorman =

Charles Dorman may refer to:

- Charles W. Dorman, military officer, attorney and judge
- Charlie Dorman (1898–1928), baseball catcher
- Red Dorman (1900–1974), Charles Dwight "Red" Dorman, baseball outfielder
- Sir Charles Geoffrey Dorman, 3rd Baronet (1920–1996), of the Dorman baronets

== See also ==
- Dorman (surname)
