= 1966 Florida Attorney General election =

- November 8, 1966
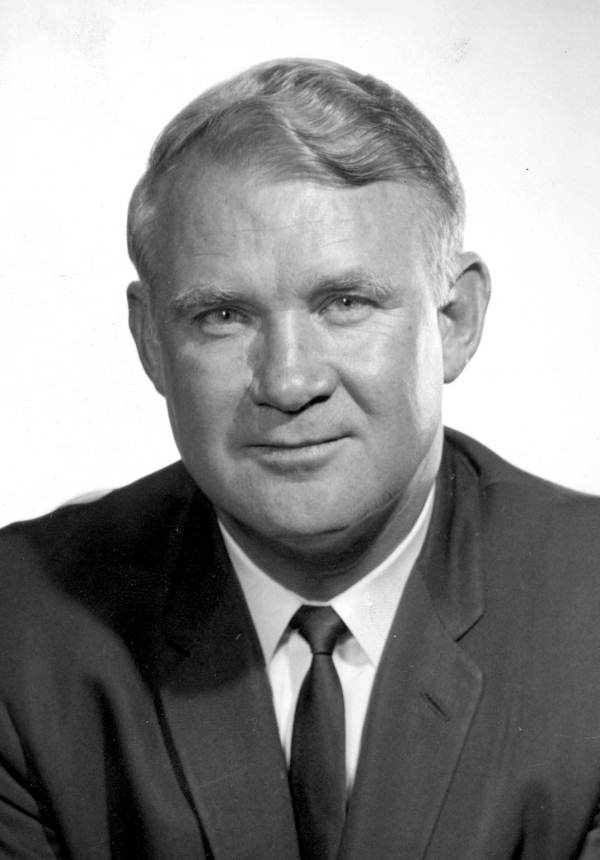

Nominee	Earl Faircloth	Ellis Rubin
Party	Democratic	Republican
Popular vote	717,630	548,504
Percentage	56.67%	43.32%
- County results Faircloth: 50–60% 60–70% 70–80% 80–90% Rubin: 50–60%
Attorney General before election
Earl Faircloth
Democratic
Elected Attorney General
Earl Faircloth
Democratic

The 1966 Florida Attorney General election was held on November 8, 1966, in order to elect the Attorney General of Florida. Incumbent Democratic Attorney General Earl Faircloth was re-elected to a second term against Republican challenger Ellis Rubin.

== General election ==
On election day November 8, 1966, incumbent Attorney General Earl Faircloth was re-elected to a second term by a margin of 169,126 votes against his Republican opponent Ellis Rubin. Faircloth was sworn in on January 3, 1967.

=== Results ===
General election results, 8 November 1966
Party	Candidate	Votes	%
Democratic	Earl Faircloth (incumbent)	717,630	56.67
Republican	Ellis Rubin	548,504	43.32
	Scattering	102	0.01
Total votes		1,266,236	100.00
Democratic hold			
