= Jacqui Thurlow-Lippisch =

American politician

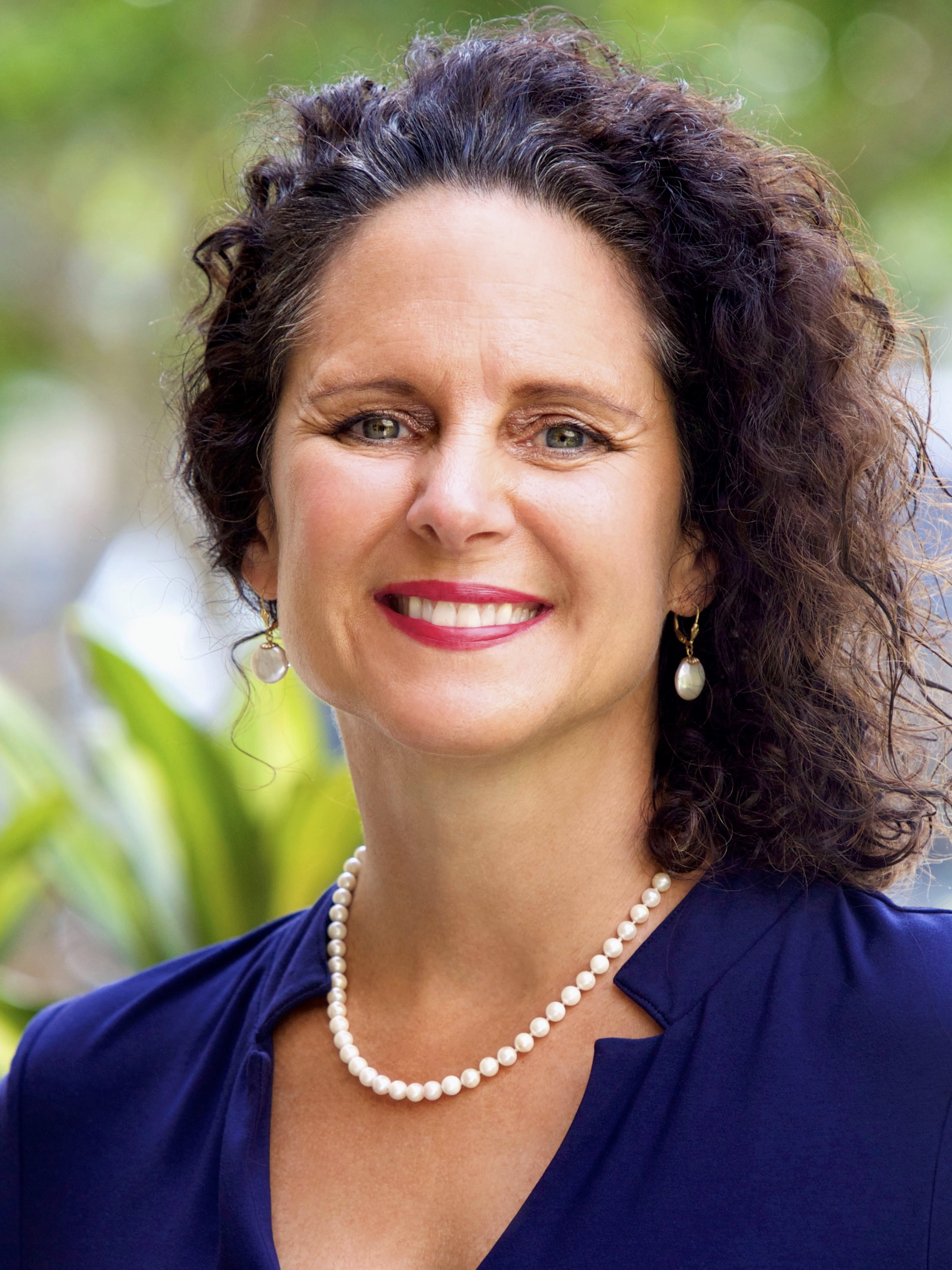

Personal details
- Born: T.A.F.B. Fairfield, California
- Party: Republican
- Spouse(s): Ed Lippisch, D.M.D.
- Education: University of Florida (B.A.) (B.A.); University of West Florida (M.A.)
- Profession: Teacher and Real Estate Professional

Jacqui Thurlow-Lippisch is a former at-large governing board member of the South Florida Water Management District representing St. Lucie, Martin, Palm Beach, Broward, Miami-Dade and Monroe counties. She is the author of the blog Indian River Lagoon, a former member of Florida's Constitution Revision Commission, a former mayor and commissioner of the Town of Sewall's Point, Florida, and a former Republican candidate for Martin County Commission.

== Public Service ==
=== South Florida Water Management District Governing Board ===
In February 2019, Florida Governor Ron DeSantis appointed Thurlow-Lippisch to serve on the South Florida Water Management District (SFWMD) Governing Board. SFWMD is one of five water management districts in the State of Florida and represents 16 counties in South Florida.

Fla. Gov. Ron DeSantis reappointed Thurlow-Lippisch on June 6, 2022. The Florida Senate did not reappoint Thurlow-Lippisch. Florida Senate President Kathleen C. Passidomo, reportedly because of hurt feelings of Kathleen Passidomo, refused to meet with Thurlow-Lippisch.

=== Florida's Constitution Revision Commission ===
In February 2017, Florida Senate President Joe Negron appointed Thurlow-Lippisch to serve on the Florida Constitution Revision Commission (CRC). The CRC is a 37-member commission that is assembled pursuant to Article XI, Section 2 of the Florida Constitution and meets every 20 years. The CRC adopts its own procedure, examines the Constitution, and holds public hearings. If the CRC recommends revisions to the Florida Constitution, the revisions are placed on the ballot for voter approval. Id.

=== Town of Sewall's Point ===
Thurlow-Lippisch served as a commissioner for the Town of Sewall's Point beginning in 2008, where she was mayor from July 2011 to November 2012. Her second term ended in November 2016.

As Commissioner, Thurlow-Lippisch worked with federal, state, and local governments and agencies to facilitate Town needs, including the Federal Emergency Management Agency, Florida Department of Transportation, Florida Fish and Wildlife Conservation Commission, and Martin County. In 2010, Thurlow-Lippisch led the passage by the town for a strong fertilizer ordinance to help safeguard the St. Lucie River and Indian River Lagoon. She also worked with Florida Fish and Wildlife Conservation Commission and the Martin County Board of County Commissioners to have Bird Island designated as a Critical Wildlife Area.

=== Martin County ===
Thurlow-Lippisch ran for Martin County Commissioner, District 1, in 2016 and narrowly lost to the incumbent commissioner by 677 votes. District 1 includes parts of Stuart, Jensen Beach, Rio, Hutchinson Island, and Sewall's Point.

=== Water Resources Advisory Commission ===
Thurlow-Lippisch served as an alternate member of South Florida Water Management District Water Resources Advisory Commission since 2012.

=== River Kidz ===
Thurlow-Lippisch has served as a volunteer administrator of the River Kidz since 2011.

=== Rivers Coalition ===
Thurlow-Lippisch has served on the board of the Rivers Coalition Legal Defense Fund as an Ex-officio member of the board, starting in 2011.

=== Harbor Branch Oceanographic Institute Foundation ===
Thurlow-Lippisch served on the board of the Harbor Branch Oceanographic Institute Foundation from 2013 to 2016.

=== Treasure Coast Regional Planning Council ===
Thurlow-Lippisch was the Vice Chair of the Treasure Coast Regional Planning Council in 2016, and was appointed to the Council in 2014.

=== Florida League of Cities ===
In 2013, Thurlow-Lippisch served as the Chair of the Environmental and Energy Legislative Committee of the Florida League of Cities. In this capacity, Thurlow-Lippisch oversaw a committee of more than 50 mayors to set legislative priorities.

== Personal ==
Thurlow-Lippisch was born at Travis Air Force Base in Fairfield, California, and has lived in Martin County since she was eleven months old. She graduated from Martin County High School in 1982, the University of Florida in 1986 with a Bachelor of Arts in Journalism, and again in 1994, with a Bachelor of Arts in German. She was a member of Florida Blue Key and the Delta Gamma sorority at the University of Florida. In 1999, she graduated from the University of West Florida with a Master of Arts in Curriculum and Development.

Thurlow-Lippisch taught at Murray Middle School, Stuart Middle School, Pensacola High School, and South Fork High School. She taught in the International Baccalaureate programs at Pensacola High School and South Fork High School. Thurlow-Lippisch suffered an injury that ended her teaching career. Subsequently, Thurlow-Lippisch worked as a real estate professional, and was named "Realtor of the Year" in 2007 by the Realtors Association of Martin County.

Thurlow-Lippisch was a member of the Natural Resources Leadership Institute Class of XV, a leadership course sponsored by the University of Florida's Institute of Food and Agricultural Sciences. As a member of the Class of XV, she won peer-awarded Burl Long Award, presented annually to the classmate who demonstrated the most growth and use of the tools learned in the program.

In 2015, Thurlow-Lippisch was awarded the Everglades Coalition's "John V. Kabler Award" for grassroots activism for her work educating the public on Everglades restoration, the St. Lucie River, and Indian River Lagoon.

Thurlow-Lippisch is married to Dr. Ed Lippisch, an oral surgeon and owner of Lippisch and Engebretsen: Oral and Maxillofacial Surgeons. Her mother, Sandra Henderson Thurlow, is a fifth generation Florida historian and author of Historic Jensen and Eden on Florida's Indian River; Stuart on the St. Lucie: A pictorial history; and Sewall's Point: The history of a peninsular community on Florida's Treasure Coast. Thurlow-Lippisch's grandfather Tom Thurlow Sr. was one of the first real estate attorneys in Stuart, and founder of Thurlow and Thurlow, which her father and brother Todd run today. Thurlow-Lippisch's grandfather J.R. Henderson worked for the University of Florida Institute of Food and Agricultural Sciences, was a professor at the university, and authored the 1939 publication Soils of Florida.
