= Earl Faircloth =

American politician and lawyer

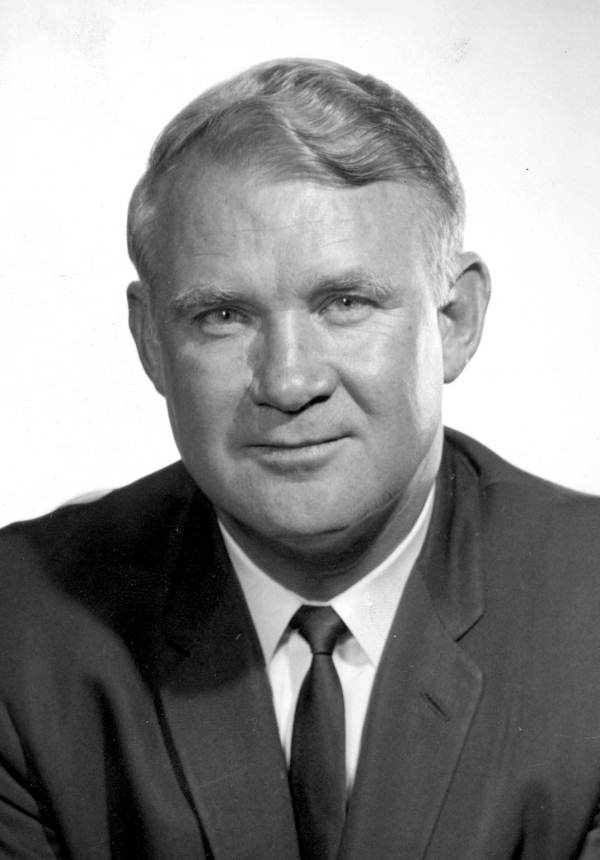

30th Attorney General of Florida
- In office 1965–1971
- Governor: W. Haydon Burns; Claude R. Kirk Jr.
- Preceded by: James W. Kynes
- Succeeded by: Robert Shevin

Personal details
- Born: September 24, 1920 Chiefland, Florida, U.S.
- Died: May 5, 1995 (aged 74) Fort Lauderdale, Florida, U.S.
- Party: Democratic
- Profession: Lawyer

Earl Faircloth (September 24, 1920 – May 5, 1995) was an American politician and lawyer who served in the Florida House of Representatives and as Attorney General of Florida.

Born in Chiefland, Florida, Faircloth graduated from the University of Florida. He then served in the United States Corps of Engineers during World War II. He then received his law degree from University of Florida College of Law. Faircloth practiced law in Tallahassee, Florida and St. Petersburg, Florida; United States Representative Claude Pepper was a law partner.

Faircloth served in the Florida House of Representatives from 1963 to 1965 and was a Democrat. He then served as Attorney General of Florida from 1965 to 1971. Faircloth ran for Florida Governor and the United States Senate and lost the elections. He continued to practice law in Fort Lauderdale, Florida. He died in a hospital in Fort Lauderdale, Florida from a series of strokes and diabetes.

Party political offices
Preceded by Richard Ervin	Democratic nominee for Attorney General of Florida; 1964, 1966	Succeeded by Robert Shevin
