= Kevin F. O'Brien =

American Jesuit

The Reverend Kevin F. O'Brien SJ

29th President of Santa Clara University
- In office July 1, 2019 – May 10, 2021
- Preceded by: Michael Engh
- Succeeded by: Lisa A. Kloppenberg (acting)

Personal details
- Born: October 8, 1966 (age 59) Montreal, Quebec, Canada
- Education: Georgetown University (B.A.); University of Florida (J.D.); Fordham University (M.A.); Weston Jesuit School of Theology (S.T.L., M.Div.)
- Occupation: Jesuit, educational leader

Kevin Fleming O'Brien, SJ (born October 8, 1966) is an American Jesuit priest, theologian, educator, and former president of Santa Clara University from 2019 to 2021. He previously served as the dean of SCU's Jesuit School of Theology and as Vice President for Mission and Ministry at Georgetown University.

O'Brien was placed on indefinite leave from SCU on March 18, 2021, after unspecified allegations in adult settings were shared with the University Board of Trustees. On May 10, 2021, the board accepted his resignation.

== Biography ==
=== Early life ===
O'Brien was born in Montreal, Quebec, and was raised in North Beach, Florida after his family moved there when he was four. In a May 2019 National Catholic Reporter profile of O'Brien, he said his parents taught their children “to give back to the community and that to whom much is given, much is expected.”

He attended Georgetown University, obtaining with a bachelor's degree in government in 1988, the same year he became a naturalized American citizen. O'Brien studied law at the University of Florida, where he served as an editor on the Florida Law Review.

=== Career ===
He practiced law for two years until a life-changing conversation with the principal of his high school alma mater, Cardinal Newman High School in West Palm Beach. Asked if he had ever considered teaching, O'Brien initially said no, but later changed his mind, left law, and taught for three years at the school. “God,” he told NCR, "has a way of getting our attention and sending the right people at the right time. The problem is we often don't realize it at the moment.” O'Brien obtained his master's degree in philosophy from Fordham University and a Master of Divinity and a Licentiate in Sacred Theology from the Weston Jesuit School of Theology. He taught philosophy and ethics at Saint Joseph's University and business law at Le Moyne College.

=== Priesthood ===
O'Brien joined the Jesuits in 1996 and was ordained as a priest in 2006. He served as associate pastor at Holy Trinity Catholic Church in Washington, D.C., and as chaplain for the Jesuit Refugee Service in Los Angeles. He also served overseas, working in Bolivia, Guatemala, India, and Mexico. O'Brien then worked at Georgetown for eight years before being named dean at the Jesuit School of Theology of Santa Clara University in 2016.

=== Santa Clara presidency ===
O'Brien was selected to be the next president of Santa Clara University in March 2019, and assumed office on July 1, 2019. He has outlined plans for his first year, which include increasing access and affordability for qualified SCU students; supporting faculty and staff in the high-cost Bay Area; completing the university's $1 billion capital campaign, and intensifying SCU's outreach to Silicon Valley and the surrounding community.

O'Brien currently serves on the boards of Fordham University and Seattle University, and previously served on the boards at Marquette University and Boston College. He serves each year as a member of the faculty of the Jesuit Leadership Seminar.

O'Brien was interviewed on MSNBC one day after the April 15, 2019, fire that broke out at Notre Dame Cathedral in Paris during Holy Week. At the time, O’Brien also talked about the importance of the holiest week of the Christian calendar.

On January 20, 2021, O'Brien celebrated mass at the Cathedral of St. Matthew the Apostle in Washington, D.C., for president-elect Joe Biden and many other officials before the inauguration of Joe Biden.

==== Allegations ====
O'Brien was removed from his Santa Clara post in 2021, following an investigation into allegations of inappropriate conduct in a setting with Jesuit seminarians. An investigation later revealed that these allegations were regarding "conversations, during a series of informal dinners" and that "no inappropriate behavior was found in any settings outside of these dinners."

== Published works ==
- The Ignatian Adventure, Experiencing the Spiritual Exercises of Saint Ignatius in Daily Life (2018). The book won an Excellence in Publishing Award from the Association of Catholic Publishers in 2012.

== Awards ==
- Dorothy Brown Award for Excellence in Teaching, Georgetown University (2016)

Academic offices
Preceded by Michael Engh, S.J.	29th President of Santa Clara University; 2019—2021	Succeeded by Julie Sullivan
Preceded by Thomas J. Massaro, S.J.	Dean of the Jesuit School of Theology of Santa Clara University; 2016—2019	Succeeded by Joseph G. Mueller
