= Terry Smiljanich =

American lawyer (born 1947)

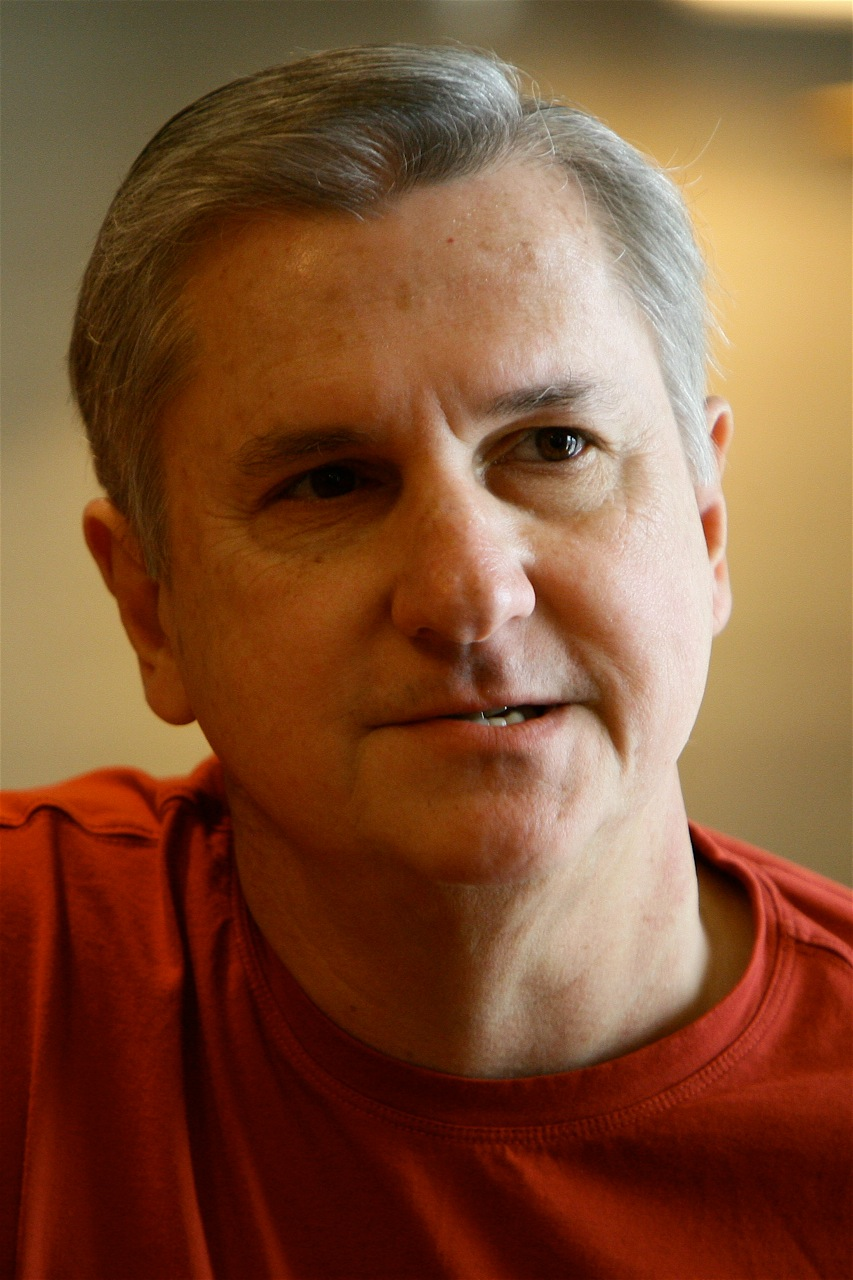
- Terry Smiljanich in 2008

Counsel to the United States Senate

Personal details
- Born: March 1, 1947 (age 79) Tampa, Florida
- Spouse: Dorothy Weik
- Profession: Lawyer, writer

Terry Alan Smiljanich (born March 1, 1947) is a retired American lawyer who acted as counsel to the United States Senate during the congressional hearings on the Iran-Contra affair. In 1983 Smiljanich co-founded the law firm Blasingame, Forizs & Smiljanich.

== Early life ==
Smiljanich was born in Tampa, Florida in 1947 to Peter and Olga Smiljanich. His father was in the Air Force and the family traveled extensively, with stays in Japan, Mississippi, Florida and Texas. He attended Alamo Heights High School, Randolph High School on Randolph Air Force Base in Texas, and graduated in 1965 from Thomas Jefferson High School in Tampa, Florida.

== Education ==
Smiljanich attended the University of Florida, where he met his wife Dorothy Weik in 1967 (they married in 1969). He graduated in 1969 with a Bachelor of Arts degree in English, and attended the University of Florida College of Law, serving as editor of the University of Florida Law Review and graduating in 1972.

== Career ==
Smiljanich served as a law clerk to United States District Court for the Middle District of Florida Judge Ben Krentzman in Tampa from 1972 to 1974. He was Assistant United States Attorney for the Middle District of Florida from 1974 to 1977. While serving as a federal prosecutor, he handled organized crime cases, kidnappings, bank robberies, and environmental crimes, among other prosecutions. He won convictions of several organized crime figures. Smiljanich served in the United States Army Reserve from 1972 to 1981, and became a captain.

Smiljanich acted as counsel to the United States Senate during the congressional hearings on the Iran-Contra affair. His responsibilities included investigations of State Department and White House personnel involved in the political scandal. He conducted the public interrogation of former United States Secretary of the Treasury and Chief of Staff Donald Regan during the televised hearings.

In 1983 Smiljanich co-founded the law firm Blasingame, Forizs & Smiljanich. He was a partner there until 1997 when the firm merged with James, Hoyer & Newcomer the firm became James, Hoyer, Newcomer & Smiljanich, P.A. where he was a senior partner. As a lawyer he has been critical of mortgage banks and the practices in the private mortgage insurance business estimating that over one million homeowners in the U.S. were victims of the industry's failure to warn them about credit report issues that could raise premiums to over $700 a month on a $200,000 loan. He is the founder and managing editor of the Consumer Warning Network writing extensively for that organization. In his capacity at the Network he has been interviewed on local and national news programs and appeared in videos produced by the organization on a variety of topics including the foreclosure crisis, consumer scams and homeopathy.

With Charles Wachter he authored a book for lawyers on class action suits in Florida.

== Skepticism ==
I say before you believe in something, you should require some credible evidence.

— Terry Smiljanich

He was a founding member and from 1989 to 2015 served as Chairman (now "Chairman Emeritus") of the Tampa Bay Skeptics, a scientific skeptic non-profit organization (affiliated with the Center for Inquiry) that Smiljanich says is "devoted to critical examination of paranormal and fringe-science claims". He described the goals of the organization "to counteract some of the kooks out there" and "attempt to impose some rationality in the world."

In a 1990 letter to the editor he chided the St. Petersburg Times for a credulous review of a book on UFOs saying such content may boost circulation, "but do little to encourage proper skepticism in a country quickly slipping into scientific illiteracy." In another letter to the editor of the paper, in 1993, he called astrology and creationism pseudosciences whose claims should be subject to scientific analysis, going on to say, "The fact that they have failed miserably in that regard allows scientists to throw them into the garbage heap along with flat earths, mind reading, and fortune telling." In a 2008 St. Petersburg Times article on a guardian angel seminar Matt Albucher quotes Smiljanich, "I say before you believe in something, you should require some credible evidence. In this case, there is none."

Since 1989 the Tampa Bay Skeptics has offered a $1,000 challenge to anyone able to prove the existence of paranormal powers under mutually agreed testing protocols, similar to the One Million Dollar Paranormal Challenge offered by the James Randi Educational Foundation. There have been ten attempts, including two that were televised, and no successes.

From 1988 to 2013 the Tampa Bay Skeptics published a quarterly newsletter, The Tampa Bay Skeptics Report for which Smiljanich was a regular contributor. He has written for the Skeptical Inquirer, a national magazine published by the Committee for Skeptical Inquiry and The Tampa Tribune. In 2010 he spoke at a meeting of the Humanist Society of the Suncoast in Florida.

== Philanthropy ==
Smiljanich is a member of the Major Gifts Committee for the University of Florida College of Liberal Arts and Sciences and bequeathed $1 million to the school. He is also a board member of the Advisory Council for the Department of Astronomy at the University.

== Hobby ==
A member and officer of the Alachua Astronomy Club, Smiljanich is an amateur astronomer.

== See also ==
- Attorneys in the United States
