= Rivers Coalition =

Nonprofit organization in Florida, U.S.

- Formation: 1998; 28 years ago
- Type: Nonprofit
- Tax ID no.: 20-3734891
- Registration no.: Florida Registration ID: 85-8013870716C-4
- Legal status: 501(c)(3)
- Headquarters: Stuart, Florida
- Website: https://riverscoalition.org/

The Rivers Coalition is an advocacy organization started in 1998 and based out of Stuart, Florida, working on behalf of the St. Lucie River, St. Lucie Estuary, and Indian River Lagoon to stop the adverse environmental and economic effects of the U.S. Army Corps of Engineers discharges into the St. Lucie River from Lake Okeechobee.

== Community involvement ==
The Rivers Coalition hosts monthly meetings at the City of Stuart Town Hall, and invites elected officials, agency representatives, scientists, and more to discuss the issues facing the St. Lucie River, St. Lucie Estuary, and Indian River Lagoon.

== Legal defense fund ==
The Rivers Coalition Defense Fund is a 501(c)(3) organization under the Internal Revenue Code and registered in the State of Florida. The legal defense fund was involved in the lawsuit: Mildenberger v. United States. 643 F.3d 938 (Fed. Cir. 2011). The text of the lawsuit is available here: .

== River Kidz ==
The River Kidz is a youth organization designed to encourage young people to learn about the issues facing the St. Lucie River, St. Lucie Estuary, and Indian River Lagoon, so they are better able to speak out, get involved, and raise awareness on behalf of Florida waters and environment.

== Members ==
The Rivers Coalition represents over 105 member organizations, which includes environmental groups, businesses, fishing clubs, and homeowners associations representing approximately 400,000 people.
