= Stumpy Harris =

American attorney (1938-2021)

Gordon Harris
- Born: Gordon Huie Harris; May 7, 1938; Atlanta, Georgia, U.S.
- Died: April 1, 2021 (aged 82); Orlando, Florida, U.S.
- Education: University of Florida (BA); University of Florida (JD)
- Occupation: Attorney
- Known for: Support of the Florida Gators
- Children: 3

Gordon Huie “Stumpy” Harris (May 7, 1938 – April 1, 2021) was an American attorney and philanthropist from Florida. He was a major donor to the University of Florida and an avid fan of the Florida Gators football team.

== Early life and education ==
Gordon Huie Harris was born May 7, 1938 in Atlanta, Georgia, to parents Huie Hodge Harris and Elizabeth Rounelle Harris (née McBrayer). Harris was raised in Jacksonville, Florida, where he attended Robert E. Lee High School and played on the school's football team. During his freshman football season, he was given the nickname "Stumpy" by his teammates, after his coach noted he was as hard to move off the line as a tree stump. Harris went by "Stumpy" for the rest of his life.

After high school, Harris attended the University of Florida, graduating with a Bachelor of Arts in mathematics. Harris was a member of the Kappa Alpha Order, and was elected president of the Interfraternity Council. Harris was also a member of the Florida Blue Key, and was inducted into the University of Florida’s Hall of Fame. After graduating, Harris returned to Jacksonville, where he taught mathematics at Robert E. Lee High School; his students included future members of Lynyrd Skynyrd. He later returned to the University of Florida, where he earned his Juris Doctor from the College of Law.

== Legal career ==
Harris began his legal career working under Spessard Holland at the predecessor firm to Holland & Knight in Bartow, Florida. In 1970, he co-founded Gray, Adams, Harris & Robinson (now GrayRobinson) in Orlando, where he practiced eminent domain law and civil litigation.

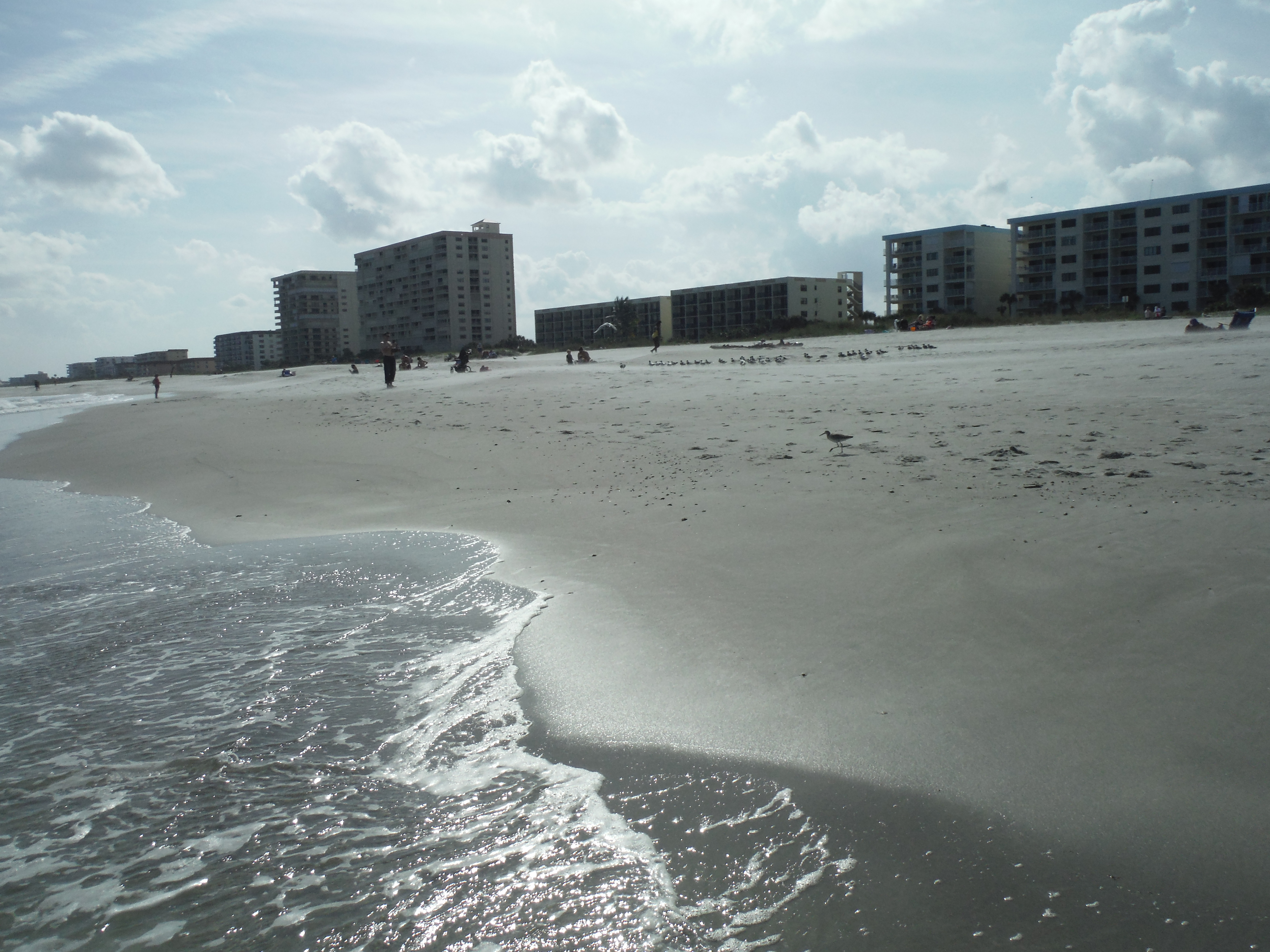
Cocoa Beach, Florida — shoreline restored following federal litigation over erosion caused by mid-20th-century jetty construction.

One of Harris's most notable legal achievements involved litigation against the United States Army Corps of Engineers to restore the eroded beaches of Cocoa Beach, Florida. In 1992, Harris, along with attorneys Jack Kirschenbaum and Mason Williams, filed a lawsuit on behalf of over 300 property owners. The suit alleged that the Corps' construction of a channel and jetties in 1954 disrupted the natural flow of sand, leading to significant beach erosion.

This led to a favorable settlement in 1999, wherein the federal government agreed to a $5 million compensation for property owners and committed to a 50-year beach restoration and maintenance plan. Today, Coca Beach has made a significant recovery from the erosion it faced in years prior.

In 2003, he left Gray, Harris & Robinson to co-found Harris Harris Bauerle Lopez, a firm specializing in eminent domain, where he practiced with his son, Bruce Harris, until his passing. Harris was a practicing attorney for over fifty years.

== Florida Gators ==
Harris was most well known for his association with University of Florida and its athletic programs, particularly the Florida Gators football team. He first attended games as an undergraduate in 1956 and remained a season-ticket holder at Florida Field for sixty-four seasons.

After earning his undergraduate degree in 1961 and his law degree in 1965, Harris became active in university and alumni affairs, serving as a president and life member of the Gator Boosters and later as a Legacy Director, a donor designation recognizing contributions in excess of $3 million to Florida athletics. He served on both the University of Florida Foundation and Athletic Association boards. Harris also established the Stumpy Harris Football Endowment and the Routledge Harris Football Endowment, the latter named for his son, to provide financial support for the university's football program. As a Legacy Director, Harris received commemorative championship rings for the 1996 and 2006 football seasons.

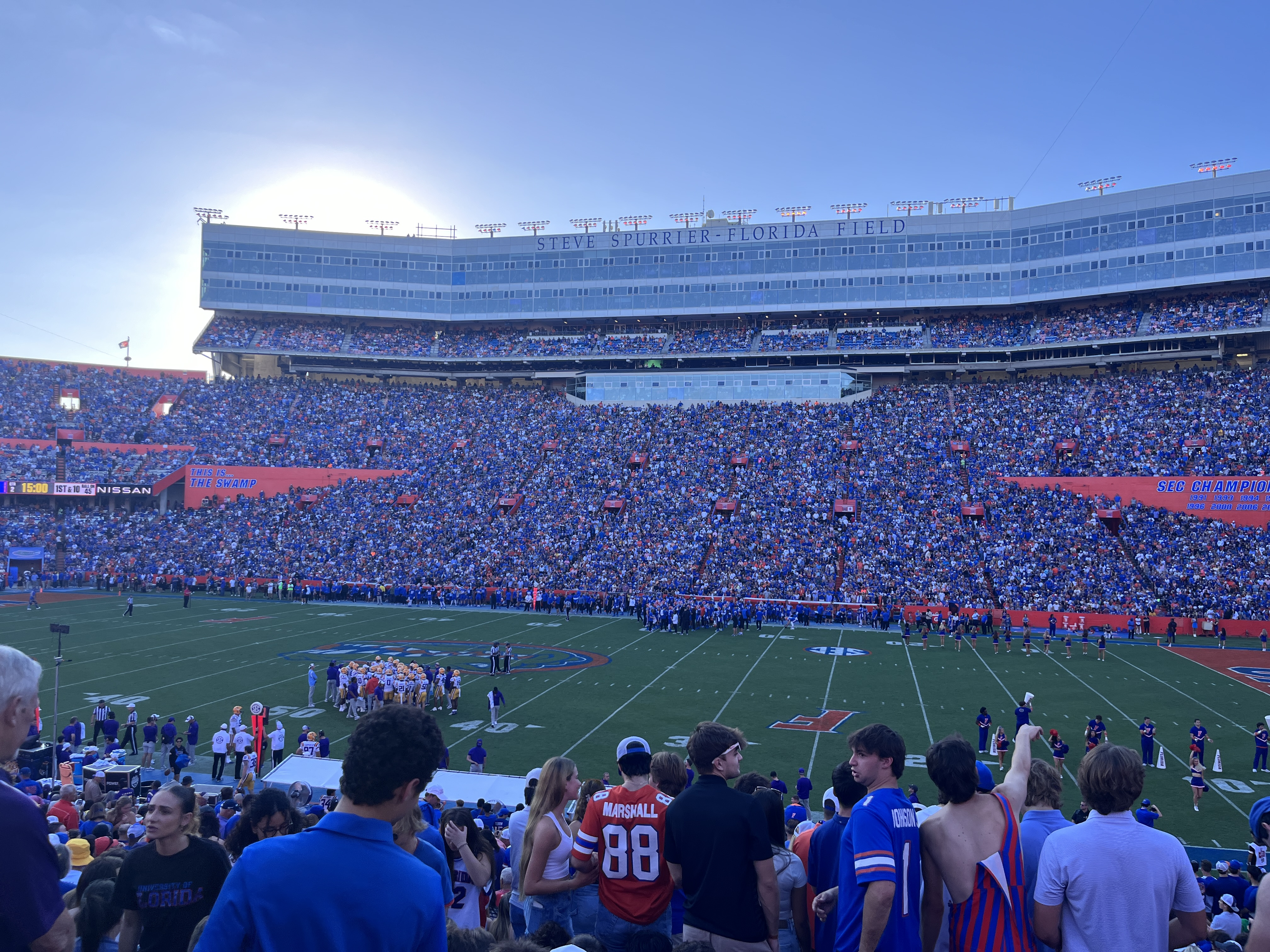
Ben Hill Griffin Stadium, where Harris kept a skybox

Harris became a prominent figure at home football games and known on campus for his support of the Florida Gators. A 2008 CBS Sports Network feature showcased “Stumpy's Gator Fleet,” a collection of orange-and-blue, Gator themed vehicles that included bicycles, trailers, a motor home, a heavily customized Ford V10 pickup nicknamed The Mother Ship, and a 1952 MG roadster that he trailered to Gainesville for game weekends. He also maintained a sixth-floor suite at Ben Hill Griffin Stadium, which he decorated in Gator memorabilia; the suite was occasionally used by head coach Urban Meyer for recruitment meetings.

Harris helped fund the installation of the Bull Gator statue outside Ben Hill Griffin Stadium, a life-size bronze alligator commemorating the Gators’ 2006 national championship season. The statue was provided through a gift from Harris and fellow alumnus, Hjalma Johnson and Joe LeCompte, and has since become a landmark on the University of Florida campus and a popular photo site for students and alumni. After his passing, Harris was designated as an In Memoriam Legacy Director of the Gator Boosters, alongside Ben Hill Griffin, Jr. and Ben Hill Griffin III.

== Personal life and death ==
After graduating from the University of Florida, Harris married Dorothy Laing, and together they had two children. Harris was an active member of the Orlando community, and served as a member and potentate of the Bahia Shriners, Senior Warden of St. Michael's Episcopal Church, and Chairman of the Board of Trustees of Trinity Preparatory School. After a divorce, Harris remarried to Ruth Littleford, and they raised their son in Winter Park, Florida.

Harris died on April 1, 2021 at the age of 82. He had three children and nine grandchildren.
