= James W. Kynes =

American politician

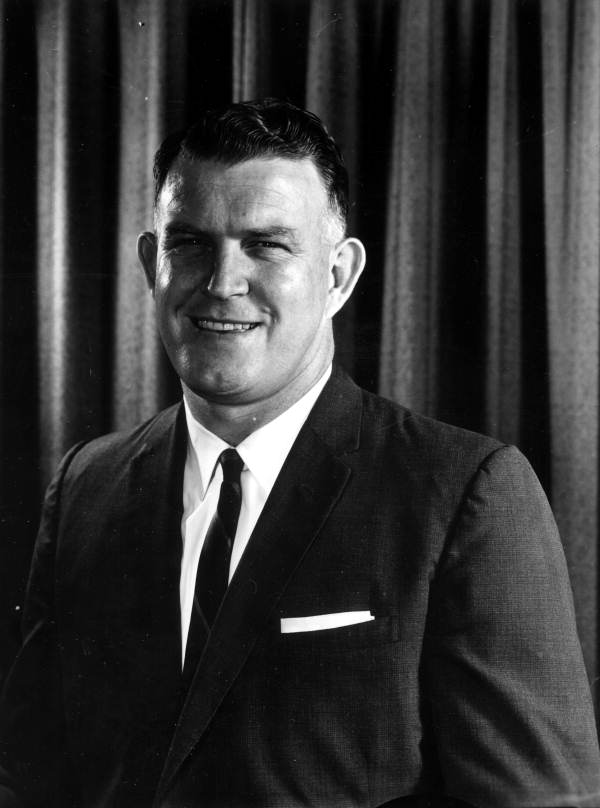
- Kynes in 1962

29th Florida Attorney General
- In office 1964–1965
- Preceded by: Richard Ervin
- Succeeded by: Earl Faircloth

Personal details
- Born: August 31, 1928 Marianna, Florida, U.S.
- Died: October 14, 1988 (aged 60) Tampa, Florida, U.S.
- Party: Democratic
- Profession: Lawyer

James Walter Kynes Jr. (August 31, 1928 – October 14, 1988) was an American college and professional football player, lawyer, political appointee, and corporate executive. Kynes served as Florida Attorney General.

== Early life ==
Kynes was born in the small town of Marianna, Florida, located in the Florida Panhandle, in 1928. He attended Marianna High School, where he was received all-state recognition playing for the Marianna Bulldogs high school football team. Kynes graduated from Fork Union Military Academy in Fork Union, Virginia, where he received Virginia all-state football honors playing for the Fork Union Blue Devils.

== College career ==
Kynes attended the University of Florida in Gainesville, Florida, where he played for coach Bear Wolf's "Golden Era" Florida Gators football team from 1946 to 1949. Kynes played both offense and defense, and was a third-team All-Southeastern Conference (SEC) lineman and the Gators' team captain in 1949. Memorably, in 1949, he played a key defensive role in the Gators' 28–7 upset of the Georgia Bulldogs and was the last Gator football player to play every minute of an entire sixty-minute game. He also played for coach Sam J. McAllister's Florida Gators men's basketball team from 1946 to 1950.

Kynes was an outstanding student and was honored as a member of Phi Beta Kappa. He earned his bachelor's degree from the University of Florida College of Business Administration in 1950, and was inducted into the University of Florida Athletic Hall of Fame as a "Gator Great" in 1976. All three of Kynes' sons also played football for the Gators in the 1970s. In a series of articles written for The Gainesville Sun in 2006, Kynes was ranked as No. 91 of the 100 greatest players in the first 100 years of Florida Gators football.

== Personal life ==
After graduating from the University of Florida, he married Marjorie Hiatt, a graduate of Florida State University and a former Seminoles cheerleader.

== Professional football ==
The National Football League's Pittsburgh Steelers selected Kynes in the fourteenth round (178th pick overall) of the 1950 NFL draft. Kynes chose to play center for the Saskatchewan Roughriders of the Western Interprovincial Football Union for a single season in 1950.

== Law, politics and business ==
Kynes returned to the University of Florida in 1952, where he attended the College of Law and was elected president of Florida Blue Key leadership honorary. He graduated with his bachelor of laws degree in 1955. He subsequently served as an officer in the U.S. Air Force for two years, before entering private practice in Ocala, Florida.

Kynes served as Florida governor Farris Bryant's executive assistant after Bryant was elected in 1960. In January 1964, Bryant appointed Kynes as the Florida Attorney General to succeed Richard Ervin, after Ervin resigned as attorney general to accept an appointment to the Florida Supreme Court. Kynes stood for a full four-year term in the 1964 Democratic Party primary election in May 1964, but was defeated by 599 votes out of 938,677 cast. and served the remainder of Ervin's term of office through January 1965.

After his term as Florida Attorney General expired in January 1965, Kynes moved to Tampa, Florida to become vice president of the Jim Walter Corporation. He was executive vice president, secretary, and general counsel of its successor companies Hillsborough Holding Corporation and Walter Industries, Inc.

== Death and legacy ==
Kynes died of stomach cancer at his home in Tampa in 1988; he was 60 years old. He was survived by his wife of thirty-eight years, Marjorie Hiatt Kynes, and their three sons.

Several friends and classmates initiated the James W. Kynes Award in 1986, which is presented annually to the Florida Gators offensive lineman "who best exemplified the mental and physical toughness and 'iron-man' determination Kynes exhibited as a Gator player." Kynes previously served as the president of the University of Florida National Alumni Association, and he was recognized as a Distinguished Alumnus. After his death, friends and former teammates endowed a University of Florida scholarship in his name. The university awards the annual $10,000 scholarship to a former Gator student-athlete, who has demonstrated exceptional character and high academic achievement, in order to pursue a graduate or professional degree.

== See also ==
- Florida Gators
- Florida Gators football, 1940–49
- List of Levin College of Law graduates
- List of Phi Beta Kappa members
- List of University of Florida alumni
- List of University of Florida Athletic Hall of Fame members

Legal offices
Preceded by Richard W. Ervin	Florida Attorney General; 1964–1965	Succeeded by Earl Faircloth
