= W. Reece Smith Jr. =

American lawyer

W. Reece Smith
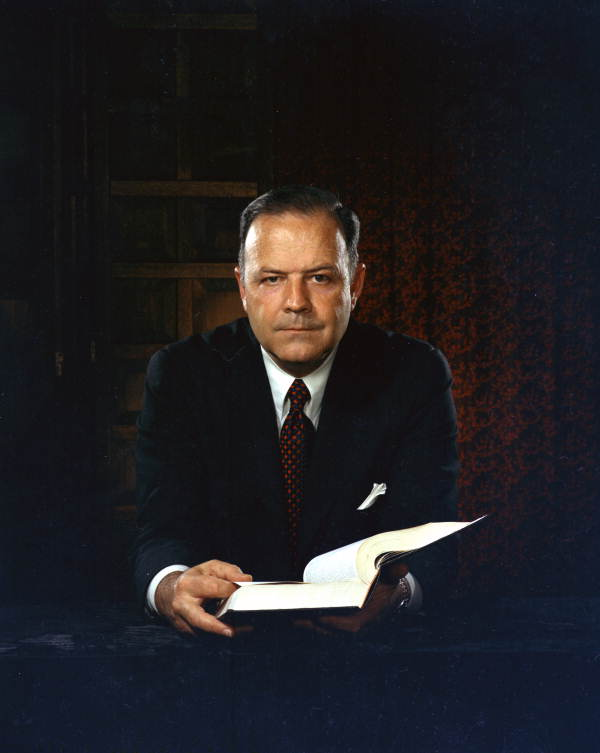
- Smith in 1972

Interim President of the University of South Florida
- In office 1976–1977
- Preceded by: Cecil Mackey
- Succeeded by: Carl Riggs

Personal details
- Born: William Reece Smith Jr. September 9, 1925 Athens, Tennessee, U.S.
- Died: January 11, 2013 (aged 87) Tampa, Florida, U.S.
- Education: B.S., University of South Carolina; LL.B., University of Florida; University of Oxford
- Profession: Attorney

William Reece Smith Jr. (September 19, 1925 – January 11, 2013) was an American lawyer. Smith served as the interim president of the University of South Florida, and the president of the American Bar Association. He was born in 1925 in Athens, Tennessee.

Smith was a native of eastern Tennessee, but attended public schools in Plant City, Florida while growing up. He received an athletic scholarship to attend the University of South Carolina, where he was a quarterback for the South Carolina Gamecocks football team and participated in the Reserve Officers Training Corps (ROTC). Smith earned a bachelor's degree in naval science from South Carolina in 1946, and after graduation he was commissioned as an officer in the U.S. Navy. After his years in the service, he attended the University of Florida College of Law. He received his law degree in 1949, and he was also a member of the student bar, Florida Blue Key and the Florida Law Review. After law school, Smith was selected as a Rhodes Scholar and he did graduate studies in international law at Christ Church, Oxford.

Smith later joined the faculty of the University of Florida College of Law, and he would then go on to private practice in Tampa, Florida. In 1976–1977, the Florida Board of Control appointed him to serve as interim president of the University of South Florida in Tampa, and, in 1980, he was elected the president of the American Bar Association.

He died in Tampa in January 2013.

== See also ==
- List of Levin College of Law graduates
- List of Rhodes Scholars
- List of University of South Carolina people
