= Chesterfield Smith =

American lawyer

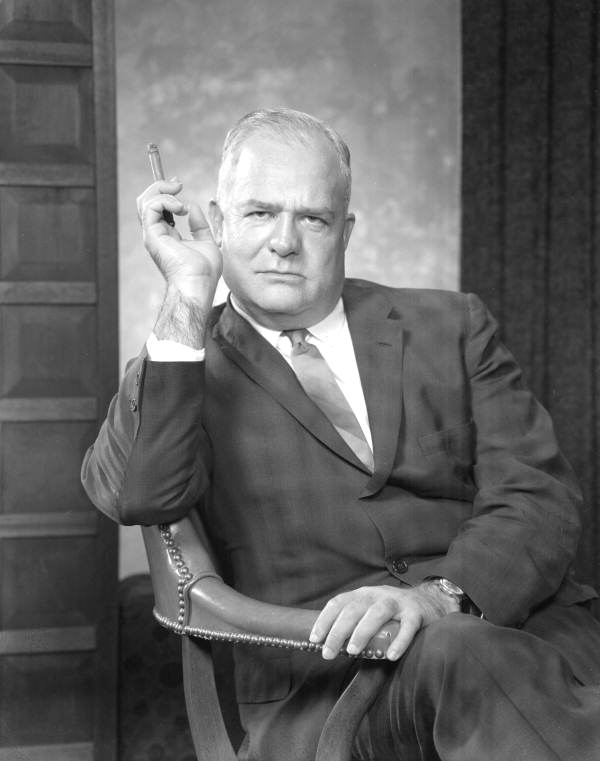

President of the American Bar Association
- In office 1973–1974
- Preceded by: Robert W. Meserve

Personal details
- Born: July 28, 1917 Arcadia, Florida
- Died: July 16, 2003 (aged 85) Coral Gables, Florida
- Profession: Attorney

Chesterfield Harvey Smith (July 28, 1917 – July 16, 2003) was an American lawyer who co-founded the law firm Holland & Knight and served as president of the American Bar Association in 1973-1974, during the Watergate scandal.

== Early life and education ==
Smith was born and grew up in Arcadia, Florida. He attended the University of Florida, where he joined the Florida National Guard. In 1940, he was called to active duty, eventually serving with the Third United States Army in France during World War II. In 1945, having won the Bronze Star and a Purple Heart, he was discharged with the rank of Major. Following his discharge, Smith enrolled at the University of Florida Law School, paying his tuition with money earned from gambling on the transport back from Europe after the war. While at the University of Florida he helped found the Florida Law Review and was a member of Florida Blue Key. He was also a member of the Board.

== Career ==
Soon after graduating from law school, Smith joined Holland, Bevis & McRae, a Bartow, Florida law firm that eventually became Holland & Knight. Smith gained early notoriety representing Florida's phosphate industry, and in 1964 was named president of the Florida Bar. In 1965, Smith was appointed chairman of the Florida Constitutional Revision Commission, and was named Distinguished Floridian of the Year by the Florida Chamber of Commerce for his efforts to revise the Florida Constitution.

While serving as President of the American Bar Association he became an outspoken critic of Richard Nixon and advocated for the congressional reappointment of a special prosecutor to investigate the Watergate affair, although Smith had earlier supported Nixon's 1968 and 1972 presidential campaigns. Smith's statement following the Saturday Night Massacre that "no man is above the law" drew national headlines and the ire of Nixon supporters.

Smith, though conveying the persona of a folksy Southerner, was an aggressive reformer. He overhauled the Florida Constitution, giving more representation to growing urban parts of the state at the expense of rural areas who sought to preserve power not reflected by their population share. As ABA president, he urged reforms not only to the structure of that organization, but to the entire American legal system. He spoke out against segregation in the 1950s, and against criminal penalties for marijuana possession in the 1960s.

Following his term as ABA President, Smith focused his attention on growing Holland & Knight from a regional Florida firm into one with a national presence. The firm currently has over 1100 lawyers in 17 U.S., 2 international and 2 representative offices. In 1998, Smith became the 12th person honored by the Florida governor as a "Great Floridian" (List of Great Floridians). On September 21, 2006, the University of Florida Levin College of Law dedicated the Chesterfield Smith Ceremonial Classroom in Smith's memory. Smith's longtime friend, Supreme Court Justice Ruth Bader Ginsburg spoke at the ceremony.

== Honors and recognition ==
In 1975, he received the Golden Plate Award of the American Academy of Achievement.

== The Chesterfield Smith Award ==
Since his passing, the Pro Bono Institute (PBI) has presented The Chesterfield Smith Award at the PBI Annual Conference in his honor. The Chesterfield Smith Award recognizes “extraordinary courage and commitment” to pro bono by someone in the legal field. According to the PBI, Chesterfield “believed, passionately and completely, in equal justice for all, while standing firm in his conviction that public service and pro bono are absolutely essential elements in the lives of lawyers and in the work of great law firms.” The first award was given in 2005 to John D. Hamilton, Jr.
