= Baya M. Harrison Jr. =

American lawyer

Baya M. Harrison, Jr.
- Born: 1912; Tampa, Florida
- Died: 1975 (aged 62–63)
- Military career
- Allegiance: United States of America
- Branch: United States Army
- Rank: Colonel
- Conflicts: World War II
- Other work: Desegregate the State University System of Florida

Baya M. Harrison Jr. (1912 in Tampa, Florida – 1975) was a politician and an attorney in Florida. He served as Chairman of the Florida Board of Control from 1960–1964. Harrison greatly impacted the State University System of Florida and helped desegregate Florida colleges and universities. He served as President of the Florida Bar in 1957.

Harrison graduated from the University of Florida College of Law in 1935 and was a member of Alpha Tau Omega while there. He served in the United States Army during World War II, and earned the rank of colonel. Harrison led the Japanese-American Squadron (442 Regimental Combat Team). While in the service he received the Bronze Star for Valor in combat. In the late 1960s he built a house in Saint Petersburg Florida. The original estate has gone under renovations since then.

Academic offices
Preceded by	Chairman of the Florida Board of Control; 1960–1964	Succeeded by

== See also ==
- Florida Board of Regents
- State University System of Florida
