= Stephen H. Grimes =

American judge (1927–2021)

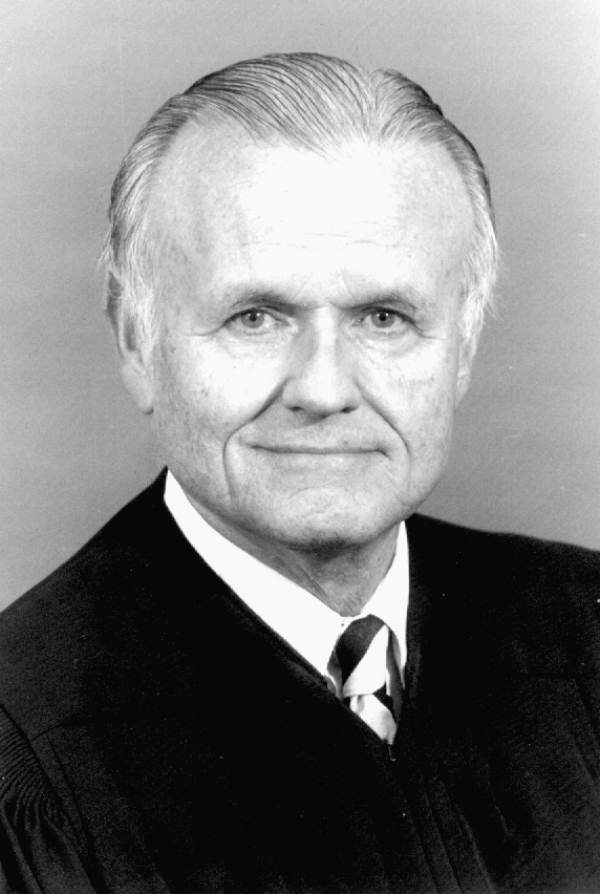

Justice for the Florida Supreme Court
- In office 1987–1996

Personal details
- Born: November 17, 1927 Peoria, Illinois
- Died: September 10, 2021 (aged 93) Tallahassee, Florida
- Spouse: Fay Fulghum

Stephen Henry "Steve" Grimes (November 17, 1927 – September 10, 2021) was an American lawyer and jurist. He served as a justice of the Florida Supreme Court from 1987 to 1996, including as chief justice from 1994 until 1996.

== Early life and education ==
Grimes was born in Peoria, Illinois, the son of Henry H. and June K. Grimes. He graduated from Lakeland High School in 1945. He joined the United States Merchant Marine and served after World War II. He then attended Florida Southern College, and transferred to University of Florida where he received his Bachelor of Science/Bachelor of Arts degree in 1950 and his Bachelor of Laws from the University of Florida Law School in 1954 with honors. At University of Florida, Grimes was president of Alpha Tau Omega. He was a member of Florida Blue Key, Phi Delta Phi legal honor society and the Order of the Coif and served as editor-in-chief of the Florida Law Review.

== Career ==
Grimes served in the United States Navy Reserve from 1951 to 1953, where he served as an operations officer on an attack transport in the Atlantic Ocean during the Korean War era. As an ensign, he was stationed at Naval Amphibious Base Little Creek, Virginia and was assigned to the USS Hollis.

After military service, he then moved to Bartow, Florida and joined the law firm of Holland & Knight. He became the head of the firm's litigation department. Grimes served as president of the Tenth Judicial Circuit Bar Association in 1966 and became a fellow of the American College of Trial Lawyers in 1971.

Grimes was appointed to the Florida Second District Court of Appeal in October 1973, serving as chief judge from 1978 to 1980. Grimes was the chair of the Florida Conference of District Court of Appeal Judges from 1978 to 80 and was also a member of the Florida Supreme Court Appellate Structure Commission, the Florida Supreme Court Article V Review Commission, the Florida Council on Criminal Justice, and the Florida Bar Tort Litigation Review Commission. In addition Grimes has served as vice-chair of the Florida Appellate Rules Committee, and the Florida Supreme Court Committee on Standard Jury Instructions in Criminal Cases, serving as chair for two years. Grimes was also a member of the Florida Judicial Qualifications Commission from 1983 to 1986 and was its vice-chair for two years. He chaired the Judicial Council of Florida from 1989 to 1994.

Florida Governor Bob Martinez appointed Grimes to the Florida Supreme Court on January 30, 1987. He became Chair of the Article V Task Force in 1994, and served as a faculty member of the Florida Judicial College. Grimes was selected by the court as chief justice on April 21, 1994, serving until May 31, 1996, when he left the court due to mandatory retirement provisions in the Florida Constitution. After leaving the court he returned to Holland & Knight.

== Outside the law ==
Grimes served as president of the Greater Bartow Chamber of Commerce in 1964. He has also served on the boards of the Polk Public Museum, the Bartow Memorial Hospital, the Bartow Public Library, and the Polk County Law Library. Grimes has also been the president of the Bartow Rotary Club, and he was the district governor of Rotary International from 1960 to 1961; he was a member of the Rotary Club of Tallahassee. Grimes served on the board of trustees for Polk Community College for three years and was chair in 1970.

Grimes was an active member of the Holy Trinity Episcopal Church in Bartow for over 30 years, and was vice counsel of the Episcopal Diocese of Central Florida from 1971 to 1973.

Grimes married Faye Fulghum of Lakeland in 1951; they had four daughters (Gay, Mary June, Sue, and Sheri) and nine grandchildren.

Grimes taught as an adjunct instructor of criminal justice at Florida Southern College. In 1980 he received an honorary Doctor of Laws from Stetson University. He died on September 10, 2021.

He died in Tallahassee at the age of 93.
