= Richard Ervin =

American judge

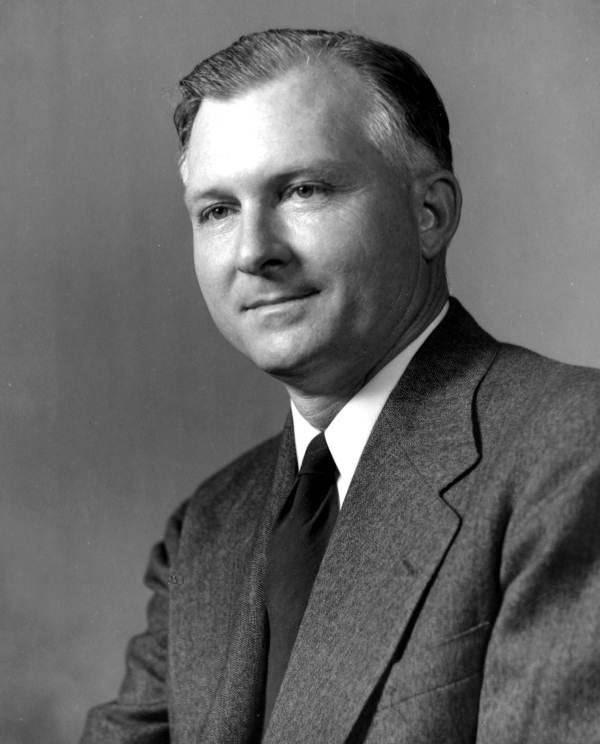

Chief Justice of the Florida Supreme Court
- In office January 7, 1969 – January 5, 1971
- Preceded by: Millard Caldwell
- Succeeded by: B. K. Roberts

28th Florida Attorney General
- In office 1949–1964
- Governor: Fuller Warren; Daniel T. McCarty; Charley Eugene Johns; LeRoy Collins; C. Farris Bryant
- Preceded by: J. Thomas Watson
- Succeeded by: James W. Kynes

Personal details
- Born: Richard Reehorse Ervin; January 26, 1905 Carrabelle, Florida, U.S.
- Died: August 24, 2004 (aged 99) Tallahassee, Florida, U.S.
- Party: Democratic
- Profession: Lawyer

Richard William Ervin Jr. (born Richard Reehorse Ervin, January 26, 1905 – August 24, 2004) was the Florida attorney general from 1949 to 1964 and served as chief justice of the Florida Supreme Court from 1969 to 1971. He is credited with guiding the state from segregation (based on the brief he wrote to the United States Supreme Court's request from each state's attorney general on how to rule regarding Brown v. Board of Education), and desegregating its schools.

His son, Richard W. Ervin III, was a judge of the First District Court of Appeal for 30 years and retired at the end of 2006.

Ervin was a graduate of the University of Florida, where he was a member of Phi Kappa Tau fraternity. He earned his law degree at the University of Florida College of Law in 1928.

Following his retirement, he was of counsel to the law firm founded by his brother Robert Ervin in Tallahassee.

He received an honorary degree from Florida State University.

From 1954 to 1975, Ervin was a national director of the fraternal organization Woodmen of the World.

Party political offices
Preceded by J. Thomas Watson	Democratic nominee for Attorney General of Florida; 1948, 1952, 1956, 1960	Succeeded by Earl Faircloth
Legal offices
Preceded by J. Thomas Watson	Florida Attorney General; 1949–1964	Succeeded by James W. Kynes
