= Raymond Ehrlich =

American judge

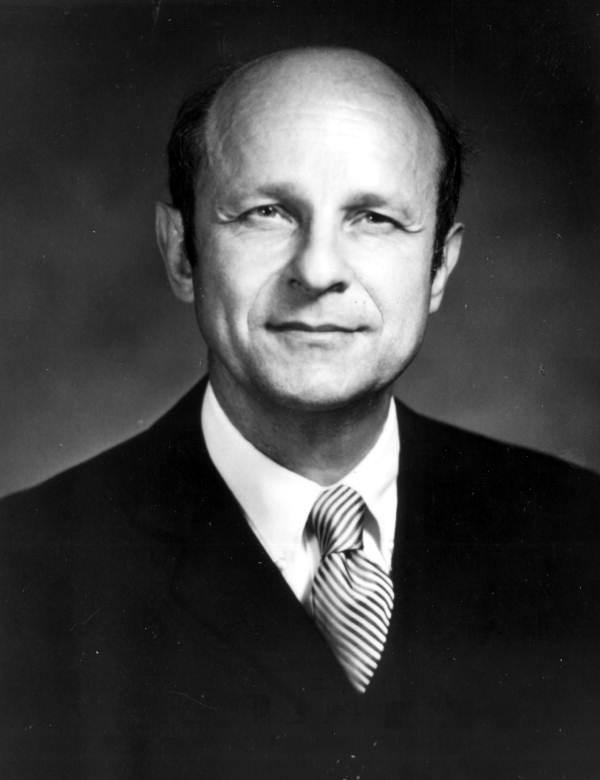

Justice of Florida Supreme Court
- In office 1981–1990

Personal details
- Born: February 2, 1918 Swainsboro, Georgia
- Died: July 12, 2005 (aged 87) Tallahassee, Florida
- Education: University of Florida (BA, LLB)

Raymond Ehrlich (February 2, 1918 – July 12, 2005) was a justice of the Florida Supreme Court.

He was a judge from the U.S. state of Florida. Ehrlich served as a Florida Supreme Court justice from 1981 to 1990. From 1988 to 1990, he served as chief justice.

Ehrlich graduated from the University of Florida with his bachelor's degree in 1939, where he was a member of the Pi Lambda Phi fraternity. He received his law degree from the University of Florida as well in 1942. Additionally, Ehrlich was a member of Florida Blue Key and he served in the U.S. Navy during World War II.

== See also ==
- List of Jewish American jurists
