= James, Hoyer, Newcomer & Smiljanich, P.A. =

James Hoyer, P.A.
- Headquarters: Tampa, Florida
- Major practice areas: Whistleblower
- Date founded: 1992
- Website: hoyerlawgroup.com

James Hoyer, P.A. (James Hoyer) is a Tampa, Florida-based law firm that focuses on whistleblower (qui tam) cases as well as consumer class action lawsuits. In 2015, the firm was named Whistleblower Lawyers of the Year by the Taxpayers Against Fraud Education Fund.

== History ==
The firm was founded in 1992 by former State Attorney for Hillsborough County Bill James, former federal prosecutors, and retired FBI agents. Since its founding, James Hoyer has helped return more than $3 billion to consumers and taxpayers who were victims of fraud. The St. Petersburg Times once called James Hoyer one of Tampa's most successful law firms.

Members of the James Hoyer firm operate the Consumer Warning Network.

== Notable Cases ==
In 1994, MetLife agreed to pay $42.75 million in refunds to 18,000 customers after James Hoyer, along with co-counsel, brought suit against the company for using misleading tactics to sell life insurance as a retirement or savings plan. MetLife also agreed to pay a $20-million fine to insurance regulators across the country in relation to the lawsuit. The 18,000 MetLife customers received an average of about $2,200 in refunds and interest, for a total payout by Met Life of $39,600,000. The attorney's fees paid by Met Life for the multi-year litigation, approved by the Court, was $2.75 million, according to the New York Times article. Met Life also agreed to change the fraudulent practices it had been accused of.

In 2000, James Hoyer helped negotiate a $206 million class action settlement with insurer American General Corp., on behalf of thousands of African American customers who were systematically overcharged due to their race for small "burial" policies.

In 2005, James Hoyer helped secure $52 million in new funding for Florida's elderly in nursing homes. The firm fully funded all the costs of the litigation and donated all of the legal time. James Hoyer received the Chair's Honor Award from the Elder Law Section of the Florida Bar for the firm's efforts.

In 2006, James Hoyer helped secure a class action settlement in which Allstate Insurance Co. agreed to change the way it uses credit reports in setting auto and homeowners insurance policies.

In 2008, James Hoyer was recognized by the Florida Bar for securing a $295,000 cy pres award for The Florida Bar Foundation. The Florida Bar Foundation is the only statewide organization in Florida that provides funding for Legal Aid and promotes improvements in addressing the civil legal needs of the poor.

In 2010, The Wall Street Journal reported on the firm's use of social media to connect with students of Westwood College, a for-profit school which the firm was pursuing litigation. The Journal also reported that Westwood College had filed a suit against James Hoyer, alleging defamation through "new media Internet weapons".

In 2012, James Hoyer represented one of four whistleblowers in a qui tam case against WellCare Health Plans, Inc that resulted in a $137.5 million settlement. The lawsuits alleged a number of schemes to submit false claims to Medicare and various Medicaid programs.

In 2013, a Las Vegas Review-Journal article profiled the case of a military whistleblower represented by James Hoyer. The case of Lt. Col. Timothy Ferner vs. giant defense contractor SAIC resulted in a nearly $6 million settlement.

In 2014, James Hoyer represented a whistleblower in a qui tam case against Endo Pharmaceuticals that resulted in a $193 million settlement with the Department of Justice. The lawsuit alleged that the makers of the Lidoderm Patch were marketing the pain reliever for unapproved uses. James Hoyer's client was found to be the sole relator entitled to share in the award by District Judge Robert Kelly in June 2014. In July 2015, Judge Kelly ordered the government to pay James Hoyer's client 1% less than the 25% maximum for her "extraordinary" efforts during the decade long litigation.

In 2015, James Hoyer represented a whistleblower in a qui tam/False Claims Act case against Education Management Corporation (EDMC), which was part of a global settlement for $99.5 million with the Department of Justice. EDMC is the second largest for-profit education company in the United States and was accused of unlawfully recruiting students using deceptive and misleading practices.

In 2016, the firm represented a whistleblower who filed a lawsuit under the False Claims Act has led to an $18 million settlement with two of Indiana’s largest health care providers, Indiana University (IU) Health and HealthNet. The settlement covered three areas: inappropriate billing when Certified Nurse Midwives, instead of doctors, cared for high risk pregnant women, in violation of Indiana Medicaid rules; kickback claims, regarding various financial schemes between IU Health and HealthNet, which improperly induced referrals; and false claims for “wrap around” payments, which are payments made to FQHCs to supplement their care to the poor.

In 2018, James Hoyer represented a whistleblower who was instrumental in achieving a $65 million settlement between the government and the 5th largest for-profit hospital system in the country, Prime Healthcare. The settlement resolved allegations that 14 Prime hospitals in California knowingly submitted false claims to Medicare by admitting patients who required only less costly, outpatient care and by billing for more expensive patient diagnoses than the patients had (a practice known as “up-coding”).

== See also ==
- Broad and Cassel
