= Stephen N. Zack =

Cuban-American lawyer (born 1947)

Stephen Zack

President of the American Bar Association
- In office 2010–2011
- Preceded by: Carolyn B. Lamm
- Succeeded by: William T. Robinson III

Personal details
- Born: Stephen Neal Zack; December 2, 1947 (age 78) Detroit, Michigan, U.S.

Stephen Neal Zack (born December 2, 1947) is a Cuban-American Lawyer who fled from Castro's communist regime as a teenager. Zack attended the University of Florida for his bachelor's degree, and he received his Juris Doctor from the Levin College of Law. Zack was the youngest and first Hispanic president of the Florida Bar. Later, becoming President of the American Bar Association from 2010 to 2011. At present he is a partner at the Boies Schiller Flexner law firm.

In August 2019, he was recognized by The American Lawyer magazine with a Lifetime Achievement Award. The award is given to attorneys who have had an extraordinary impact on society and the legal profession over their careers.
