= Charles W. Dorman =

United States Marine Corps general

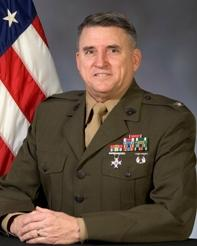
- Brigadier General Charles Dorman
- Born: Jacksonville, Florida, U.S.
- Military career
- Allegiance: United States of America
- Branch: United States Marine Corps
- Service years: 1974–2006
- Rank: Brigadier General
- Commands: Judge Navy-Marine Corps Court of Criminal Appeals

Charles W. Dorman is a retired Brigadier General for the United States Marine Corps, and was the former Chief Judge for the Navy-Marine Corps Court of Criminal Appeals.

Dorman served as an attorney & judge for the Marine Corps for 33 years. In his career, he handled over 300 cases for the Government.

== Education ==
Dorman graduated from the University of Florida in 1970 with his bachelor's degree, and in 1973 he received his Juris Doctor from UF as well. In 1980 he received his LLM from the George Washington University
