= Martha Barnett =

American attorney

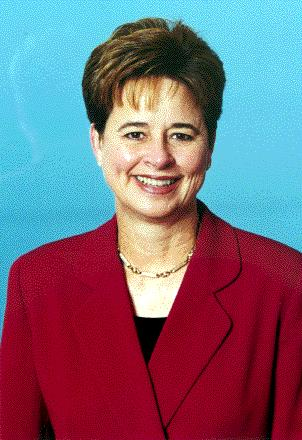

President of the American Bar Association
- In office 2000–2001
- Preceded by: Bill Paul
- Succeeded by: Alfred P. Carlton, Jr.

Personal details
- Born: June 1, 1947 (age 78) Dade City, Florida, U.S.
- Education: Tulane University (BA); University of Florida (JD)

Martha Walters Barnett (born June 1, 1947) is an American attorney who served as the president of the American Bar Association from 2000 to 2001. She is now a partner at the Holland & Knight law firm.

== Education ==
Barnett earned her bachelor's degree from Newcomb College at Tulane University, and she received her Juris Doctor from the University of Florida. In 2006, she was honored as a Distinguished Alumnus by the University of Florida.

== Career ==
After graduating from law school, Barnett became the first woman hired by Holland & Knight, where she served for the next 40 years. Barnett was selected as the president of the American Bar Association in 2000, and served alongside then-first lady Hillary Clinton on the inaugural ABA Commission on Women in the Profession.

During Barnett's tenure as president of the ABA, the White House formally ended the practice of allowing the American Bar Association to pre-screen judicial nominees before they were officially announced. The ABA continues to maintain a rating system of federal judges and nominees.

Barnett was nominated to serve on the Florida Constitution Revision Commission by Governor Lawton Chiles and the Taxation and Budget Reform Commission by Governor Bob Martinez.

She was appointed by Florida Gov. Lawton Chiles to serve on the 1997-98 Florida Constitution Revision Commission.
