= Holland & Knight =

American multinational law firm

Holland & Knight LLP
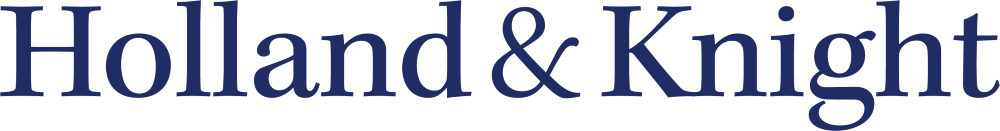
- Headquarters: Tampa, Florida
- No. of offices: 30 U.S., 5 international
- No. of attorneys: 2,174 (2025)
- Revenue: $2.043 billion(2024)
- Date founded: 1968
- Founder: Spessard Holland
- Company type: Limited liability partnership
- Website: hklaw.com

Holland & Knight LLP is a law firm headquartered in Tampa, Florida, with 35 offices, five of them outside the U.S. It has a significant lobbying practice and, as of 2022, was the 7th-largest US-based law firm with 1,596 attorneys, expanding to 2,174 attorneys as of 2025.

== History ==
Former judge and later US senator Spessard Holland opened a law practice in 1929 as Holland & Bevis. Peter O. Knight, who established his law practice in Tampa in 1889, tried his first case at age 18 and later refused an offer from the Harding administration to be considered for the US Supreme Court. Their namesake firms merged in 1968 to form Holland & Knight.

In 1997 the firm acquired Haight, Gardner, Poor & Havens, making them the 12th-largest law firm in the United States at the time with around 600 attorneys. That number had grown to 840 by 1998 following subsequent acquisitions. Holland & Knight merged with the Dallas-based, 275-attorney Thompson & Knight in 2021, retaining the name Holland & Knight. During the first quarter of 2023, Holland & Knight merged with Nashville-based Waller, Lansden, Dortch & Davis, resulting in a roster of almost 2,000 attorneys. The merger took effect in March 2023.

During the mid-2020s, Holland & Knight became a noted facilitator of management services organization (MSO) private equity deals with individual law firms, and became a significant component of its legal services transactions practice.

In its 2024 financial year, under chair and chief executive Robert Grammig and managing partner David Whitestone, the firm passed $2 billion in revenue for the first time, an increase of 10.5%. Profits per equity partner reached $2.29 million, and the firm added more than 80 lawyers, a 4.7% increase in headcount.

== Lobbying and political contributions ==
=== Individuals pre-Holland & Knight ===
In 1956, Spessard Holland joined eighteen other senators in signing the Southern Manifesto, proclaiming court-ordered school desegregation to be an "unwarranted … abuse of judicial power" and declaring their intention to "resist forced integration by any lawful means." Holland, a former governor and now US senator, was still a partner in the firm of Holland, Bevis, Smith, Kibler and Hall and retained senior partner status in the merger that created Holland and Knight in 1968.

=== Holland & Knight ===
Holland & Knight is a registered lobbyist. Its Public Policy & Regulation Group is the third largest lobbying practice in the United States by revenue. Its members have included former US representative Tillie Fowler and former Florida State Senator Curtis Kaiser. Its PAC, Holland & Knight Committee For Effective Government, contributed over $500,000 to Federal Candidates for the Reporting Period 2023-2024. Its work and contributions at the Florida state level are similarly significant.

In 1994, the firm filed a suit on behalf of victims of the 1923 Rosewood Massacre, in which an all-black town was burned and then razed by a white mob, with the deaths of anywhere from 6 to 150 black people. When the suit was dismissed, a team at the firm, led by Martha Barnett, successfully lobbied Florida legislature to appropriate $1.5 million in compensation for the survivors and the descendants of the victims.

In 2002, the firm sought a change in Florida law to ease restrictions on payday lenders. Florida PIRG Director Mark Ferrulo expressed shock that the firm "would represent legalized loan sharks that prey on the most vulnerable populations in Florida."

In 2025, its lobbying practice was noted among the most significant by Bloomberg Government.

== Malpractice litigation ==
In 2026, the Florida real estate company MV Realty PBC sued Holland & Knight and three of its partners, Jesús Cuza, Rebecca Cañamero and J. Raul Cosio, for up to $1.2 billion, alleging that the firm's advice destroyed its business. The claim concerns the firm's work designing MV Realty's homeowner benefit agreements, under which the company made upfront payments to homeowners in exchange for decades-long exclusive rights to list their properties should the owners decide to sell. State authorities brought proceedings characterising the arrangements as deceptive and unconscionable, and courts in several states criticised the early termination fee attached to them.

According to the complaint, sixteen states filed lawsuits over the programme and more than thirty opened investigations, and the firm authorised the programme through formal opinions, presentations and emails while billing the company more than $9 million. Holland & Knight said that it was confident in the advice it had provided and in the merits of its position, and retained Peter Prieto of Podhurst Orseck, a former head of its own litigation practice, to defend the claim.

== Awards and achievements ==
- The National Law Journal ranked Holland & Knight as the 14th largest firm in the United States on its 2025 NLJ 500 list, which ranks firms based on size. Based on gross revenue, it was ranked 26th on The American Lawyer’s 2025 AmLaw 200 rankings. The firm has multiple Best Law Firms Tier 1 rankings by Best Lawyers.
- The firm received national first-tier rankings in the 2013 U.S. News – Best Lawyers Best Law Firms guide in 22 practice areas.
- More than 130 Holland & Knight attorneys were named in the Chambers USA 2013 guide.
- Corporate Counsel magazine named Holland & Knight a "2012 Go-To Law Firm" for the top 500 U.S. companies.
- Holland & Knight ranks among the top-performing law firms that provide superior client service, according to 2013 BTI Consulting Group's annual survey of corporate counsel and C-level executives.
- Holland & Knight was named one of the world's top trademark law firms in the World Trademark Review 1000 – The Definitive Guide to Trademark Legal Services.
- Directors & Boards magazine ranked Holland & Knight the nation's top law firm for dealing with director liability issues.
- The firm was named the Law Firm of the Year in the Washington, D.C., area by the Greater Washington Commercial Association of Realtors three times in the past five years.
- Working Mother magazine and Flex-Time Lawyers named Holland & Knight one of 50 "2012 Best Law Firms for Women".
- The firm earned Gold Standard Certification from The Women in Law Empowerment Forum (WILEF) p.
- The firm ranked third in The American Lawyer magazine's 2012 Diversity Scorecard for the number of Hispanic attorneys.
- The firm was awarded the "Michael K. Reese Quality of Life Award" by The Florida Bar Young Lawyers Division.
