= Gleaton =

Gleaton is a surname. Notable people with the surname include:

- Derryck Gleaton, or DSharp (born 1988), American musician
- Harry H. Gleaton (1906–1998), American politician
- Jerry Don Gleaton (born 1957), American baseball pitcher
- J. D. Gleaton, American convicted murderer
- Leo Antony Gleaton (1948–2015), American photographer
- Maurice Gleaton, or Parlae (fl. 2002–2012), member of American group Dem Franchize Boyz
- Todd Gleaton (born 1968), American golfer

== See also ==
- Mount Gleaton, in Antarctica, named after Clarence E. Gleaton
