= List of popular music violinists =

This is a list of notable popular music violinists including fiddlers.

== A ==
- Armen Anassian (Armenian)
- Laurie Anderson (experimental)
- Darol Anger (jazz, "psychograss")
- Gilles Apap (gypsy, swing, classical, bluegrass, Irish)
- Emilie Autumn (rock, gothic, industrial)
- Abhijith P. S. Nair (fusion violin, Indian, Western)

== B ==
- Aly Bain (Scottish and Shetland fiddling)
- Alexander Bălănescu (founder of Balanescu String Quartet)
- Miri Ben-Ari (hip-hop)
- Byron Berline (bluegrass)
- Andrew Bird (alternative, folk, jazz)
- Charlie Bisharat (pop, rock, jazz, classical, folk)
- Bitch (aka Capital B) of Bitch and Animal
- Tracy Bonham (alternative rock)
- Karen Briggs (pop, rock, jazz, classical, folk)
- Linda Brava (classical, pop, folk)

== C ==
- Eddy Chen (classical)
- Ann Marie Calhoun (bluegrass, pop)
- Chris Carmichael (classical, pop. country, folk, jazz, rock)
- Vassar Clements (bluegrass, country, jazz)
- Sharon Corr (The Corrs, pop, rock, folk)
- Papa John Creach (blues, rock)
- David Cross (King Crimson)
- Regina Carter (jazz, classical)
- Ray Chen (classical)
- Chloe Chua (classical)

== D ==
- Jerald Daemyon (urban, contemporary jazz, R&B)
- Charlie Daniels (country, country rock)
- Rick Danko (The Band)
- Saul Davies (James)
- Taylor Davis (anime, classical, pop)
- Ryan Delahoussaye (Blue October)
- Tymon Dogg (The Mescaleros, rock, folk)
- DSharp (electronic dance music, classical, hip hop)

== E ==
- Warren Ellis (of Dirty Three, Nick Cave and the Bad Seeds, Grinderman)

== F ==
- Dave Favis-Mortlock (FiddleBop, jazz, folk)
- Fayiz Muhammed (Classical, Indian, World music)
- Henry Flynt (classical hillbilly)
- Alasdair Fraser (Scottish)

== G ==
- David Garrett (classical, pop)
- Seth Gilliard (pop)
- Johnny Gimble (bluegrass, Nashville session player)
- Jerry Goodman (progressive rock, jazz)
- Richard Greene (bluegrass, country, rock)

== H ==
- Petra Haden (alternative rock)
- Anne Harris (Celtic music, folk rock, afrobeat, soul, blues, chamber music)
- Don "Sugarcane" Harris (blues, rock)
- Edward W. Hardy (classical, pop, musical theatre)
- Lili Haydn (alternative rock)
- Jerry Holland (Cape Breton fiddle music)
- Hilary Hahn (classical)

== I ==
- Eileen Ivers (Irish fiddle)

== J ==
- Jana Jae (of The Buckaroos and Hee Haw) (bluegrass, country)
- Eddie Jobson (Roxy Music, U.K.)
- Jinxx from Black Veil Brides

== K ==
- Mik Kaminski, member of the Electric Light Orchestra
- Eyvind Kang (jazz and classical)
- Judy Kang (classical, pop, hip hop, rock)
- Doug Kershaw (Cajun)
- Anna Katharina Kränzlein (folk rock, folk metal)
- Olga Kholodnaya
- Gundula Krause (bluegrass, cajun, folk, folk-rock)
- Alison Krauss (bluegrass)

== L ==
- David LaFlamme (classical and rock)
- Jim Lea (rock, pop)
- Paz Lenchantin (A Perfect Circle, Zwan, Entrance)
- Laurie Lewis (bluegrass, American old-time)

== M ==
- Ashley MacIsaac (Scottish-Canadian fiddling)
- Manoj George (World fusion, Indian classical)
- Sean Mackin (Yellowcard, rock, pop punk)
- Buddy MacMaster (Scottish-Canadian fiddling)
- Natalie MacMaster (Scottish-Canadian fiddling)
- Chris McKhool (Canadian folk-jazz, touring with Sultans of String)
- Hugh Marsh (jazz, popular)
- Mia Matsumiya (avant-garde, experimental)
- Lucia Micarelli (classical, pop, most notably toured with Jethro Tull and Josh Groban)
- Rob Moose
- Bijan Mortazavi
- Armen Movsessian (touring orchestra with Yanni)

== N ==
- Máiréad Nesbitt (fiddler for Celtic Woman ensemble)
- Nash the Slash (classical, rock, experimental)
- Sarah Neufeld (Arcade Fire, indie rock)
- Nigel Kennedy (Beatles to heavy rock)

== O ==
- Mark O'Connor (bluegrass, folk, classical)
- Helen O'Hara (Dexys Midnight Runners)

== P ==
- Owen Pallett (a.k.a. Final Fantasy, also plays with The Arcade Fire)
- Una Palliser (classical, pop, folk, most notable toured with Shakira)
- Itzhak Perlman (classical, most noted for violin solo in Schindler's List)
- Anna Phoebe (rock, pop, metal, classical, etc.)
- Lorenza Ponce (new age, pop, rock, jazz, classical, folk, folk rock, bluegrass, country)
- Antonio Pontarelli (rock)
- Jean-Luc Ponty (jazz, jazz-rock)
- Kalan Porter (pop, rock)

== R ==
- David Ragsdale (rock, progressive rock)
- Mary Ramsey (10,000 Maniacs, John & Mary, rock, folk)
- Bridget Regan (rock, folk)
- Davide Rossi (pop, rock, classical)
- Lettice Rowbotham (dubstep, pop, rock, classical)
- Sergey Ryabtsev (Gogol Bordello, rock, folk)
- Alexander Rybak (classical, folk, pop)
- Roopa Revathi (classical, western)

== S ==
- Jonathan Sevink (The Levellers)
- Gingger Shankar (10-string double violin, of The Smashing Pumpkins)
- John Sheahan (The Dubliners, folk)
- Ray Shulman (Gentle Giant)
- Rosemary Siemens (gospel, classical, pop, bluegrass)
- Antoine Silverman (bluegrass, jazz)
- Kyla-Rose Smith (Afropop, hip hop)
- Sophie Solomon (Oi Va Voi, klezmer, folk, rock)
- Eric Stanley (hip hop, pop, classical)
- Robby Steinhardt (rock)
- Lindsey Stirling (violin pop, electro, dance-pop)
- Dinesh Subasinghe (pop, Music of Sri Lanka, Baila, Celtic, Chinese, Buddhist music, rock, folk)
- Alicia Svigals (klezmer)
- Dave Swarbrick (British/Celtic folk and folk/rock)
- Sam Sweeney (British/Celtic folk and folk/rock – Kerfuffle, Bellowhead, Leveret, Made in the Great War)
- Jamii Szmadzinski (electric)

== T ==
- Boyd Tinsley (Dave Matthews Band)

== V ==
- Vanessa-Mae (British, violin techno-acoustic fusion)
- Maxim Vengerov (Israeli)
- April Verch (Canadian)
- Sarana VerLin (Dark Carnival) (electric 5-string) (rock, folk)
- Susan Voelz acoustic electric 5 string, Poi Dog Pondering, Alejandro Escovedo, rock, electronica
- Josh Vietti (hip hop, pop)

== W ==
- Noel Webb
- Joan Wasser (The Dambuilders, indie rock)
- Sara Watkins (Nickel Creek)
- Jenny Wilhelms (folk)
- J. Loren Wince (Hurt)
- Patrick Wolf (experimental, alternative, folk, electronic)
- D'arcy Wretzky (of The Smashing Pumpkins)
- Gavyn Wright (classical, pop, soundtrack)

== Y ==
- Brett Yang (classical)
- Samvel Yervinyan (touring orchestra with Yanni)
- Diana Yukawa (contemporary, modern, classical, pop)
- Kunnakudi Vaidyanathan (Indian classical, Carnatic)

== Z ==
- Joel Zifkin (Kate and Anna McGarrigle and Richard Thompson etc)
