= Violin scam =

Fraudulent activity

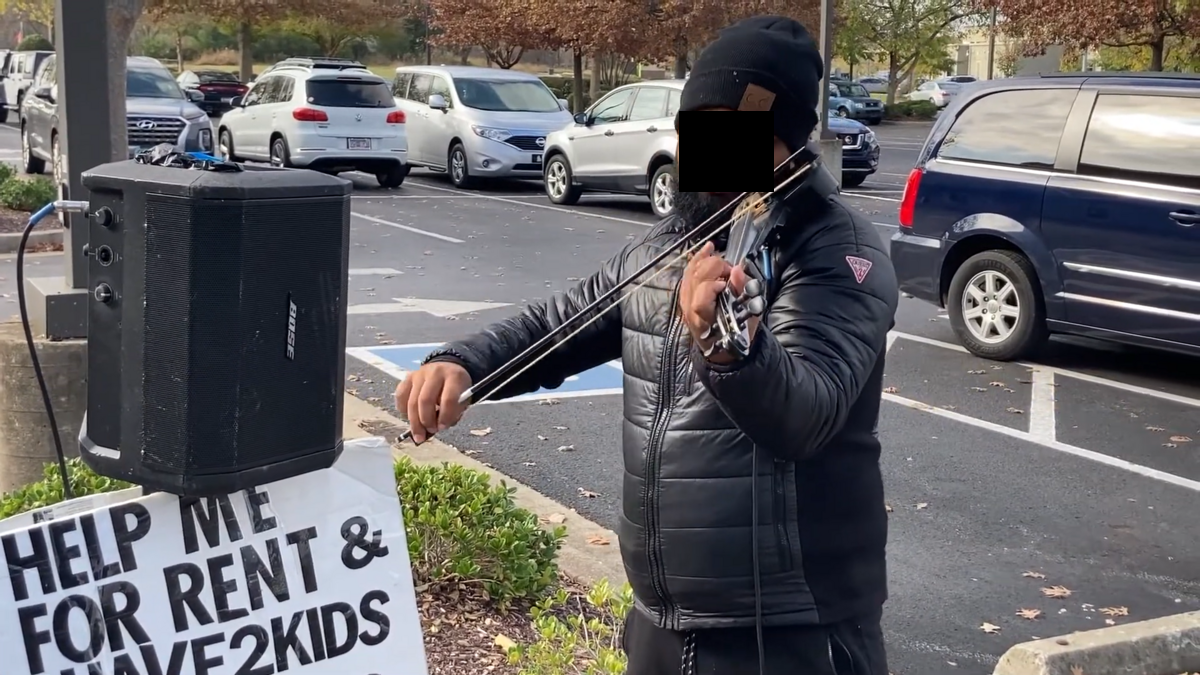
A violin scammer using a speaker to play pre-recorded music.

The violin scam is a fraudulent public performance where someone pretends to play the violin using pre-recorded music. The scammer solicits donations using a sign and sometimes with a co-conspirator who approaches listeners for money. The scam gained wider public attention when violinist Eric Stanley released a video criticizing the practice. He argued that it diminishes the value of the years of training required to become a professional musician. Scammers primarily use electric violins which are plugged into a speaker. The violin itself emits no sound as all the sound comes from the speaker, making the scam easier to conduct for a novice or non-player. Their sign typically asks for money to assist with bills, rent, or medical treatment for themselves or an ill family member. When asked if the performance is genuine, the performers often state that they don't speak English.

The scam has been documented across the United States including Connecticut, Michigan, Colorado, Texas, Arizona, Alaska, Idaho, New Mexico, Florida, and Iowa. It has also been seen in the United Kingdom, with individuals conducting the scam near London Underground stations and shopping center entrances.

Law enforcement across the United States have warned the public of the issue. The Montgomery County Department of Police has stated that the performer's claims of being homeless or having a sick relative are usually untrue, but that they cannot officially discourage the donation of money.

There has been confusion by the general public between real street violinists and scammers. Real musicians who busk for a living have felt threatened by the scam, with some filming themselves confronting the scammers. David Wallace, the chair of the Strings Department at the Berklee College of Music, believes that skepticism of the legitimacy of a performance may cause people to "become more cautious about giving to any musician." Scott Simon, the host of Weekend Edition Saturday on NPR, called the scam "one more raindrop in the storm of schemes that blur our view of what's right in front of us."
