= Florida Blue Key =

Leadership honor society at the University of Florida

- Founded: November 1, 1923; 102 years ago University of Florida
- Type: Honor
- Affiliation: Independent
- Status: Active
- Emphasis: Leadership and Service
- Scope: Local
- Chapters: 1
- Members: 6,500+ lifetime
- Headquarters: 3160 J. Wayne Reitz Union; Gainesville, Florida 32611; United States
- Website: www.fbk.org

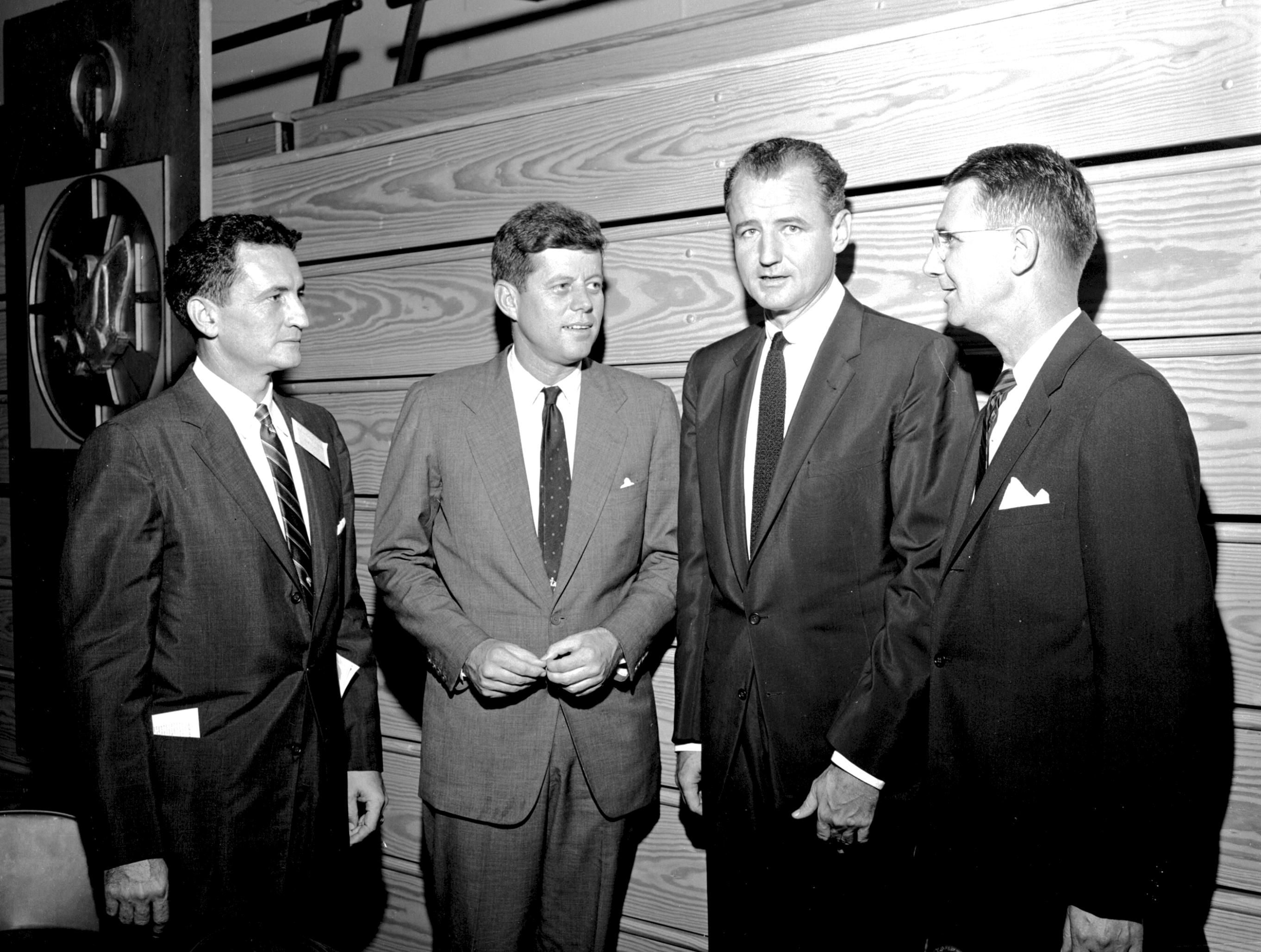
Florida Blue Key banquet with O'Connell, Kennedy, Smathers, and Reitz in 1957.

Florida Blue Key, is a student leadership honor society at the University of Florida. It was founded in 1923. Florida Blue Key recognizes a class of students each semester who have displayed exemplary leadership on campus and have made significant contributions to the University of Florida through service. It has been heavily scrutinized and criticized for its influence on student government and campus life at the university (under what is known as "The System"), as well as in Florida politics more generally.

== History ==
=== Founding and early years ===
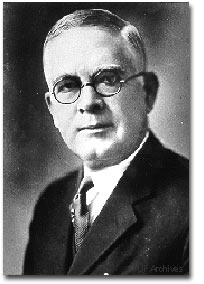
President Albert Murphree

Florida Blue Key was established November 1, 1923, several days before the University's homecoming celebration. At the suggestion of President Albert Murphree, dean of general extension Bert C. Riley brought together a group of student leaders to form an organization recognizing leadership and promoting service. Among the duties of Florida Blue Key were hosting campus visitors and assisting the university's president.

In this respect, Blue Key was given the task of planning and executing homecoming activities that year and has continued to lead this activity ever since. Also included in the 1923 Homecoming was Dad's Day, a time for parents to visit and acquaint themselves with campus life. Dad's Day and Homecoming were held concurrently until the 1930s.

The organization quickly became so popular that Blue Key spread to colleges and universities across the country. Initially, membership in the organization was ex officio; a student automatically belonged to the organization if he held one of the major student organization positions on campus.

In the 1920s, the University of Florida was the state's only institution of higher learning where a white male could continue his education. During the same time, the leadership of the state was male, predominantly those from Florida. If one of those leaders were college educated, it was most likely he went to the University of Florida and, to a large measure, it was consistent that student leaders at the University of Florida would likely remain in Florida and would assume roles of leadership within the professional, political, governmental, business, education cultural, religious, and social life of the state. The networking of those students with each other, and with other alumni of the institution, provided a powerful force and unique opportunity for service to the University of Florida. While Florida Blue Key membership offered many opportunities for service to the University, it also provided opportunities for personal enhancement and advancement. Many doors were opened to young college graduates whose resume included membership in Florida Blue Key.

=== Separation with national chapters ===
The concept of a group of student leaders pooling their talents and interests to plan and promote a major event for their campus was a popular idea. Through Dean Riley's travels and professional contacts, similar organizations were developed on other campuses and it wasn't long before it seemed appropriate to organize into a national group.

For a variety of reasons, the University of Florida chapter decided not to be part of the national organization with the issue coming to a decision point 1932 and 1935. The Florida group thought the proposed constitution of the national organization took too much control from the hands of the students; and it disagreed with some specific tenets of membership, including the requirement of a 2.5 grade point average. The Florida group believed the organization was not an academic one but, rather, a leadership and service group; thus, if one was progressing satisfactorily toward a degree (i.e. 2.0), one should be eligible for membership. Since then, Florida Blue Key has changed its stance on the grade point average requirement, now requiring a 2.75 GPA in order to be tapped.

The Blue Key Honor Society came into being and is a very respected national organization with chapters on many campuses throughout the country. Florida Blue Key was also formed as an organization only to be found at the University of Florida. The dispute was a clear indication that FBK did not intend to serve as a passive honor for University of Florida students, but rather as an active force in shaping the events of the university and state.

The parting of the ways between the parent chapter and other chapters forming the national organization left deep wounds on many Florida students. The perceptions of the conflict being a very important part of any subsequent discussions about the organization for years to come; including discussions of orientation of new members. The active members at that time wanted nothing to do with the national organization once it was founded, and, further, wanted to be sure that their successors would not become involved in it. Examples of such feelings are expressed in the last sentence of the Oath of Membership in Florida Blue Key and the Constitution. Through the 1940s, the orientation of new members included hours on the discussion of this topic.

Today, the memory of this separation is still discussed in orientation, but only for the purposes of relating its historical significance and for emphasizing that Florida Blue Key is the name of the organization and that it has no relationship to, and is not part of, The Blue Key National Honor Society. A transfer student to the University of Florida often assumes his membership in a Blue Key National Honor Society chapter at another institution provides him with reciprocal membership in Florida Blue Key only to find out that is not the case. To this day, Florida Blue Key controls the use of all trademark and intellectual property rights related to Blue Key Honor Society. Furthermore, Blue Key Honor Society is prohibited from chartering or forming chapters at any institution within the State of Florida.

== Activities ==
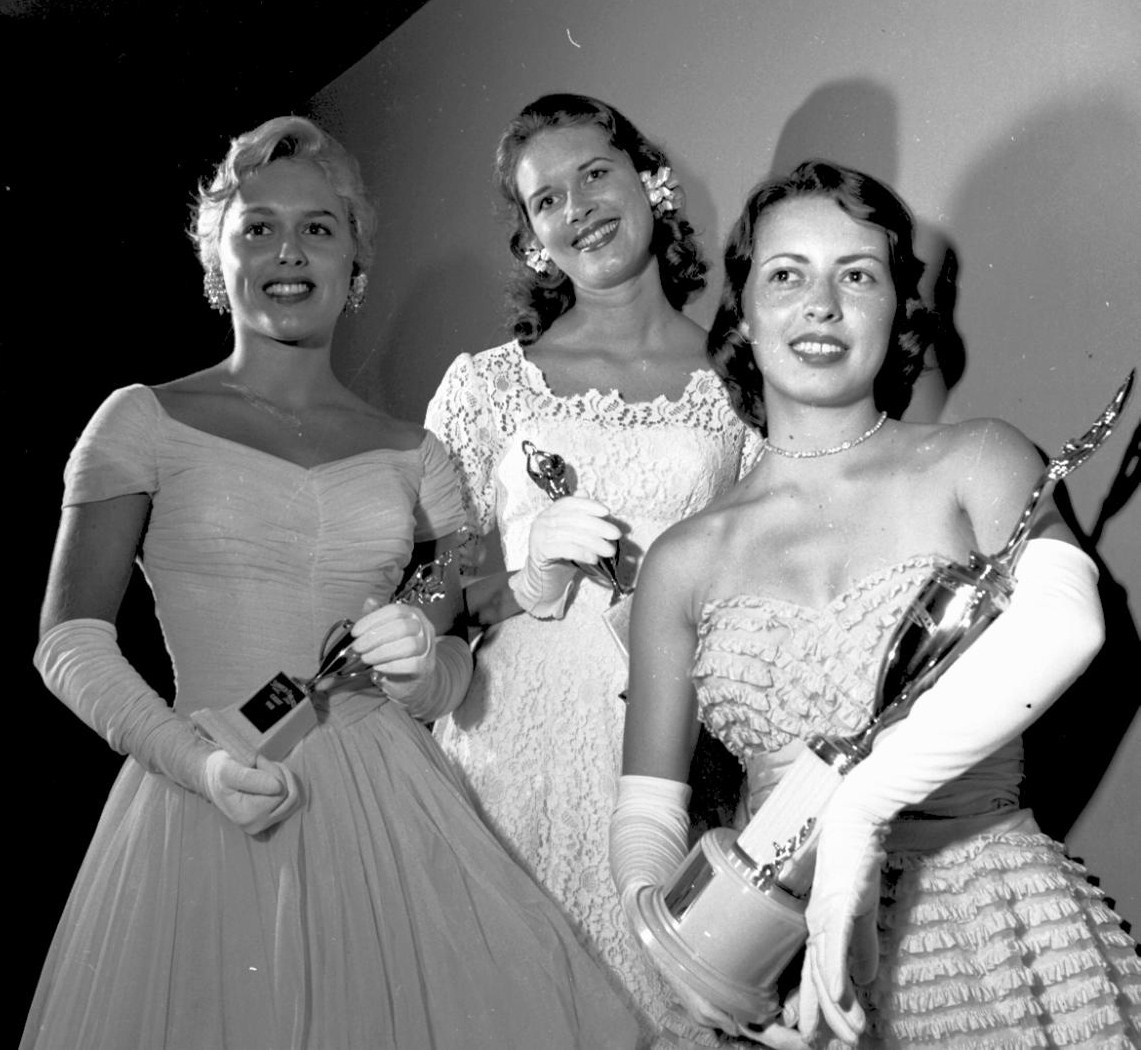
Miss University of Florida in 1958

Florida Blue Key continues to sponsor and organize the University of Florida's annual homecoming celebration and Gator Growl. These events are widely recognized as the largest Homecoming celebration in the country, which has grown to encompass dozens of events and community activities throughout the fall semester.

Gator Growl is billed as the largest student-run pep rally in the world; an estimated 75,000 people have attended the event in past years. Gator Growl, nicknamed "Growl" by some students, usually features comedians such as Bill Cosby, Frank Thornton, and Dane Cook in addition to the school rallies, but occasionally a top-tier musical act headlines the show. The first Gator Growl occurred in 1932, and has been a tradition at the University of Florida for over 80 years.

The Blue Key Speech & Debate Tournament, sponsored by FBK since the early 1980s, is one of the largest and most prestigious high school speech & debate tournaments in the country.

Other activities include organizing UF's Legal Day, sponsoring the Miss University of Florida pageant, lobbying efforts on behalf of the university, and various community debates regarding issues concerning Florida and UF.

== Notable members ==
Members of Florida Blue Key include notable politicians and prominent business leaders.

== Legal issues ==
=== Grapski lawsuit ===
In 1995, Florida Blue Key was sued by graduate student Charles Grapski, who claimed that some of the organization's members had defamed him during his candidacy for student body president. In his complaint, Grapski charged that several members of Florida Blue Key conspired to alter Grapski's criminal record, adding a false charge of child molestation, and circulate it on campus.

According to a 1997 lawsuit by Charles Grapski, Florida Blue Key maintains tight control over the student government and University of Florida. Florida Blue Key was found guilty of defamation of character and conspiracy to defame, and held liable for damages of $250,000. Grapski eventually settled for $85,000, and Florida Blue Key has since claimed no liability.

== "The System" ==
In February of 2026, Tyler Sklar, a student at the University of Florida, filed a 200+ page ethics complaint entitled “Vision Party Probe”.. Filed on February 3, 2026, the ethics complaint alleges that the current Senate President and sitting Chief Justice have used their positions of authority to preserve the legitimacy of an at-large, winner-take-all election system that has benefitted the governing Vision Party and secures control of student self-governance to a political machine that has been recognized in court documents, academic literature, and media articles as "The System."

As asserted by the complaint, the actions taken by the Student Senate to continue apportioning the map in this manner and the Supreme Court denying oral hearings, narrowing jurisdiction, and delaying the release of public records of their internal deliberations have reinforced the electoral system. According to the complaint, these acts helped maintain one-party control of the Student Senate, enabling continued control over student fee budgets and appointments affecting major agencies such as ACCENT and Student Government Productions. The complaint further alleges that Florida Blue Key, as identified in academic research and prior litigation as central to the System, has financial conflicts of interest within these Student Government agencies. The allegations are based on publicly available records, governing documents, court filings, academic research, and exhibits cited in the complaint, and have not yet been adjudicated.

The ethics complaint was presented to the Student Senate body the next day during a public comment section. As of March 2026, the full text complaint has been made public, and is listed on the SG website under Elections, Records, and then Spring 2026.

=== Influence on-campus and in politics ===
Florida Blue Key's control of politics has been compared to The Machine at the University of Alabama. For decades, members of Florida Blue Key have been the gatekeepers of student involvement on campus.

The Independent Florida Alligator wrote that "For students aspiring to hold public office one day, the path seems simple," adding "Go to UF. Get involved in Student Government. Get tapped to join Florida Blue Key. Make the right connections." The publication has also written that a "fluid set of alliances governed by a select group of powerbrokers" called the "System" hovers over Student Government and Florida Blue Key, stating that the System assigns power to a small group of campus leaders who have a decisive influence on who gets tapped to join Florida Blue Key, among other things. The Tampa Bay Times has similarly written that "Campus politics in Gainesville have long been controlled by a powerful few with the help of a voting bloc made up of social sororities and fraternities. Much of the power-brokering occurs in a highly selective organization called Florida Blue Key."

Criticism of FBK has propped up, with the organization being accused of intentionally tapping fewer individuals affiliated with multicultural communities. Wesley Maul, a former FBK President has addressed these concerns stating, "Many Florida students hold positions of responsibility and leadership throughout campus and the Gainesville community, but merely holding such a position doesn't insure [sic] membership in Florida Blue Key." Maul also stated that FBK members are concerned with the diversity of the organization.

Off-campus, Florida Blue Key has also been cited to have an influence in Florida's state politics, with Florida Trend writing in 2004 that, in the past, "the doors to the governor's mansion, Legislature and judiciary in Florida all seemed to unlock with a Blue Key." Then-U.S. Representative Adam Putnam stated, "Anybody who was anybody in Florida politics had been in Florida Blue Key -- and not just politics but business, the law, agriculture." Putnam also called FBK "probably more political than the Florida Legislature," and "outstanding preparation for political campaigning, the good and the bad."

== See also ==
- Blue Key Honor Society
- Honor cords
- Collegiate secret societies in North America
