= Anhayla =

American singer-songwriter

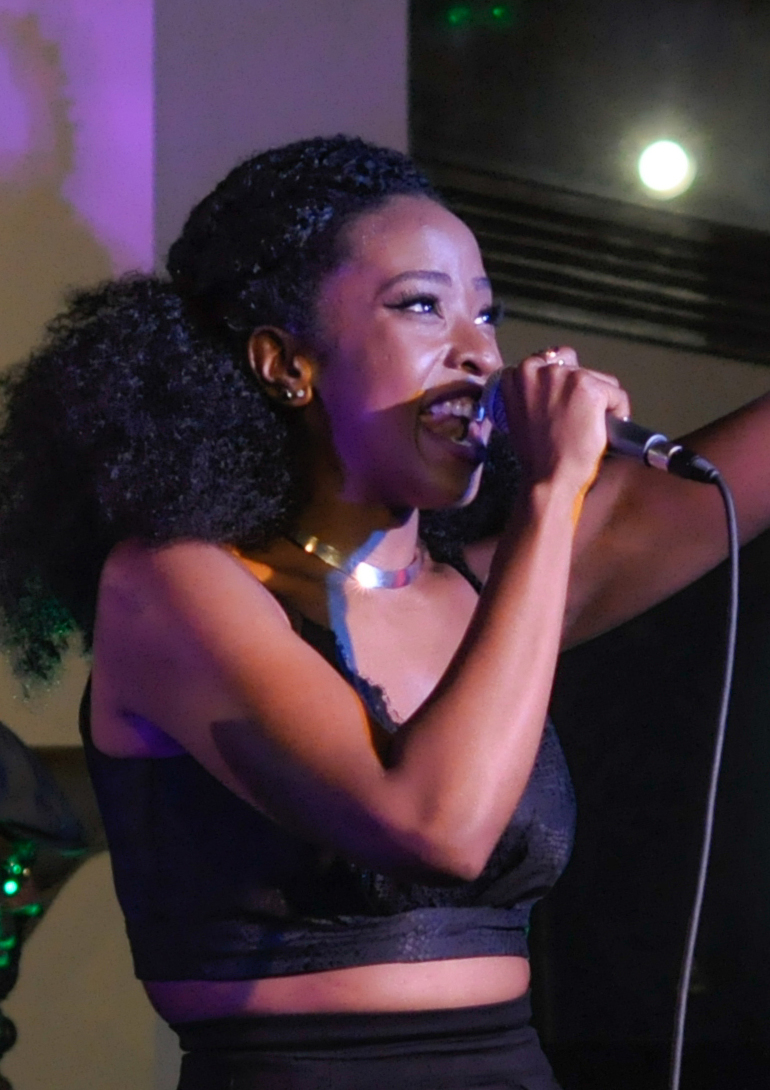
- Anhayla performing at the Hippodrome Theater in 2013
- Born: May 24, 1988 (age 36); Norfolk, Virginia, U.S.
- Occupations: Singer; songwriter; guitarist
- Relatives: Eric Stanley (brother)
- Musical career
- Genres: Alternative R&B; soul; hip hop
- Instruments: Vocals; guitar
- Years active: 2009–present
- Website: www.anhayla.com

Anhayla Rene Stanley (born May 24, 1988), better known by her stage name Anhayla (/ˈɑːnˈheɪlɑː/ ahn-HAY-lah), is an American singer, songwriter, and guitarist. She is known for covering popular R&B and hip hop songs presented on her YouTube channel, Anhaylarene. Anhayla was endorsed by Crafter guitars in 2013.

== Early life ==
Anhayla was born in Norfolk, Virginia, and began singing at the age of 5. She started writing music on the piano in middle school and credits her mother as a being a musical influence. Anhayla attended Virginia Commonwealth University and studied accounting.

== Career ==
In 2010, Anhayla participated in We Are the World 25 for Haiti (YouTube edition). In 2013, she released an album If I Was.

Anhayla made her first national appearance in a 2015 AT&T commercial, singing Spaceship.

In a 2016 interview with NPR, Anhayla revealed that she has more than twenty inches of scars on her back as a result of a car accident. Her struggle with self-image lead her to organize Girls Nite Out, an annual event that encourages positivity and self-esteem for girls ages 5 to 18.

== Discography ==
=== Albums ===
List of albums, with selected details
Title	Album details
If I Was	Released: January 1, 2013; Label: Self-released; Formats: CD, digital download

=== Singles ===
Year	Title
2013	"If I Was"
2015	"Spaceship"

== See also ==
- YouTube personalities
