= Josh Vietti =

American violinist

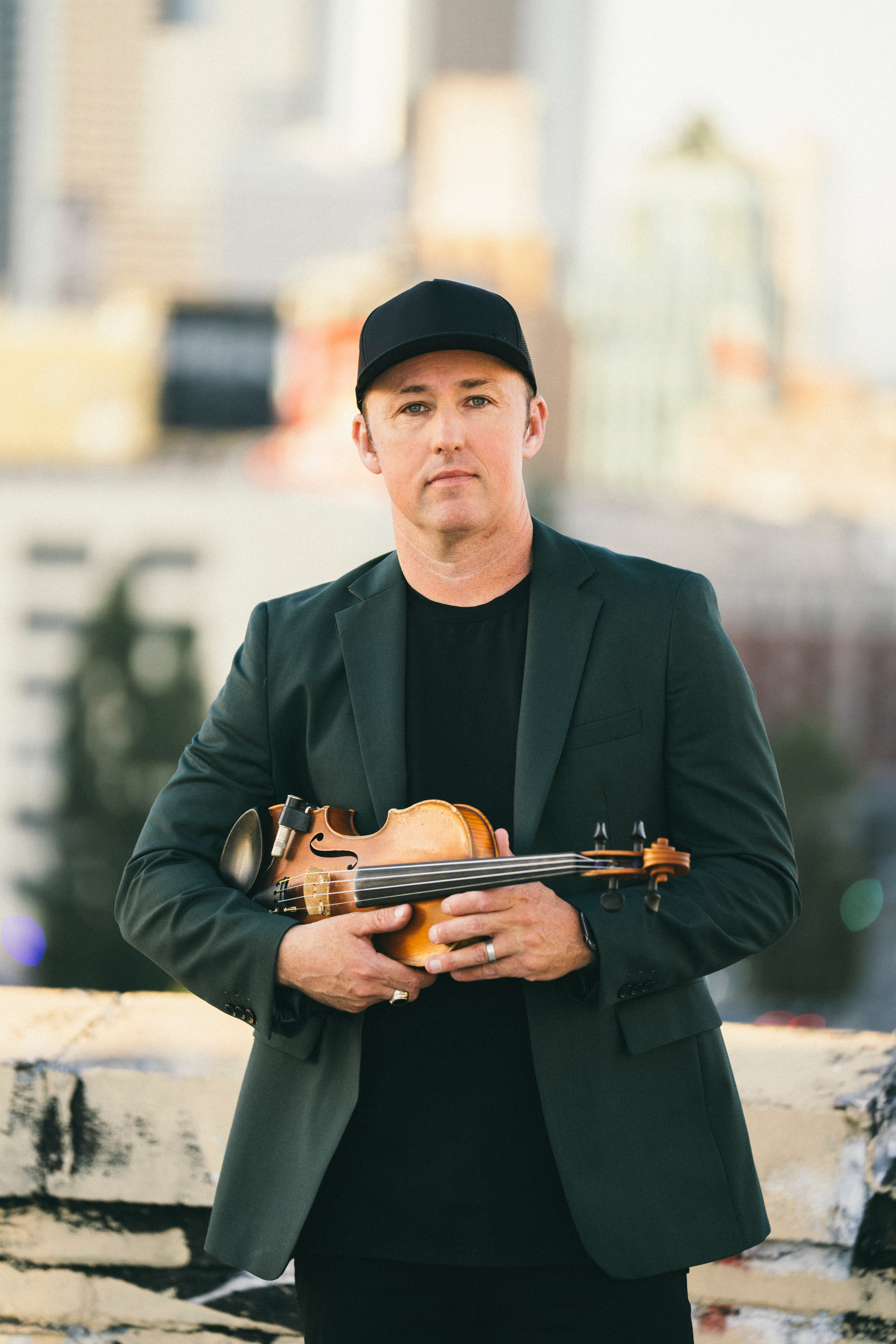
- Vietti in 2026
- Occupations: Violinist, recording artist, composer

Josh Vietti is an American violinist, recording artist and composer known for combining classical violin with hip-hop, jazz, pop and other contemporary musical styles. He began his professional music career in 2006 as a street performer on the Third Street Promenade in Santa Monica, California. In 2012, CBS Los Angeles included Vietti among its best breakout music acts in Los Angeles.

His career has included an appearance on The Ellen DeGeneres Show, music featured on ESPN's Sunday NFL Countdown, performances at jazz festivals in the United States, and a European tour with rapper 50 Cent.

== Early life ==
Vietti began playing the violin at the age of four. At seven, he received a scholarship to study with violinist Mischa Lefkowitz of the Los Angeles Philharmonic, with whom he studied for approximately ten years.

In 2006, Vietti began performing professionally as a street musician on the Third Street Promenade in Santa Monica. CBS Los Angeles later reported that he sold nearly 50,000 demo CDs while street performing.

== Career ==
=== 2010–2012: early national exposure ===
In 2010, Vietti appeared as a violin street performer in a commercial promoting the NBA All-Star Game. The commercial featured LeBron James and Dwyane Wade and was narrated by rapper Common.

In November 2011, Vietti appeared as a musical performer on The Ellen DeGeneres Show.

In 2012, Vietti performed at the Michael Jordan Celebrity Invitational at Aria Resort and Casino in Las Vegas.

During this period, he also opened for artists including Ne-Yo and Earth, Wind & Fire.

Vietti appeared on Sway in the Morning on SiriusXM's Shade 45 in 2012, performing violin arrangements of hip-hop songs.

=== College touring ===
College performances became a significant part of Vietti's touring career during the 2010s. In 2012, he performed at institutions including the University of Missouri–St. Louis and the University of Wisconsin–La Crosse.

By the end of 2012, CBS Los Angeles reported that Vietti had completed a nationwide 80-date college tour. His college touring continued throughout the decade.

In February 2014, Vietti performed at Palmer Hall at the University of Montevallo.

His later college appearances included Gustavus Adolphus College in 2016 and the University of Delaware in 2017.

Vietti also performed at the Nott Memorial at Union College. A 2022 Union College profile described him as a nationally known hip-hop violinist.

Vietti later stated that his college touring ultimately included more than 300 colleges across the United States.

=== 2013–2014: festivals, Dodger Stadium and ESPN ===
In 2013, Vietti performed at Gator Growl at the University of Florida.

He also performed at the Festival at the Switchyard in Carrollton, Texas, where he opened on the main stage for Sugar Ray and Smash Mouth.

Vietti performed at the Stone Soul Music Festival at Richmond International Raceway in Richmond, Virginia, in June 2013, on a lineup that included B.o.B, French Montana and Fantasia.

Vietti has made multiple appearances at Dodger Stadium. In April 2013, he performed as part of the Los Angeles Dodgers' Viva Los Dodgers entertainment program.

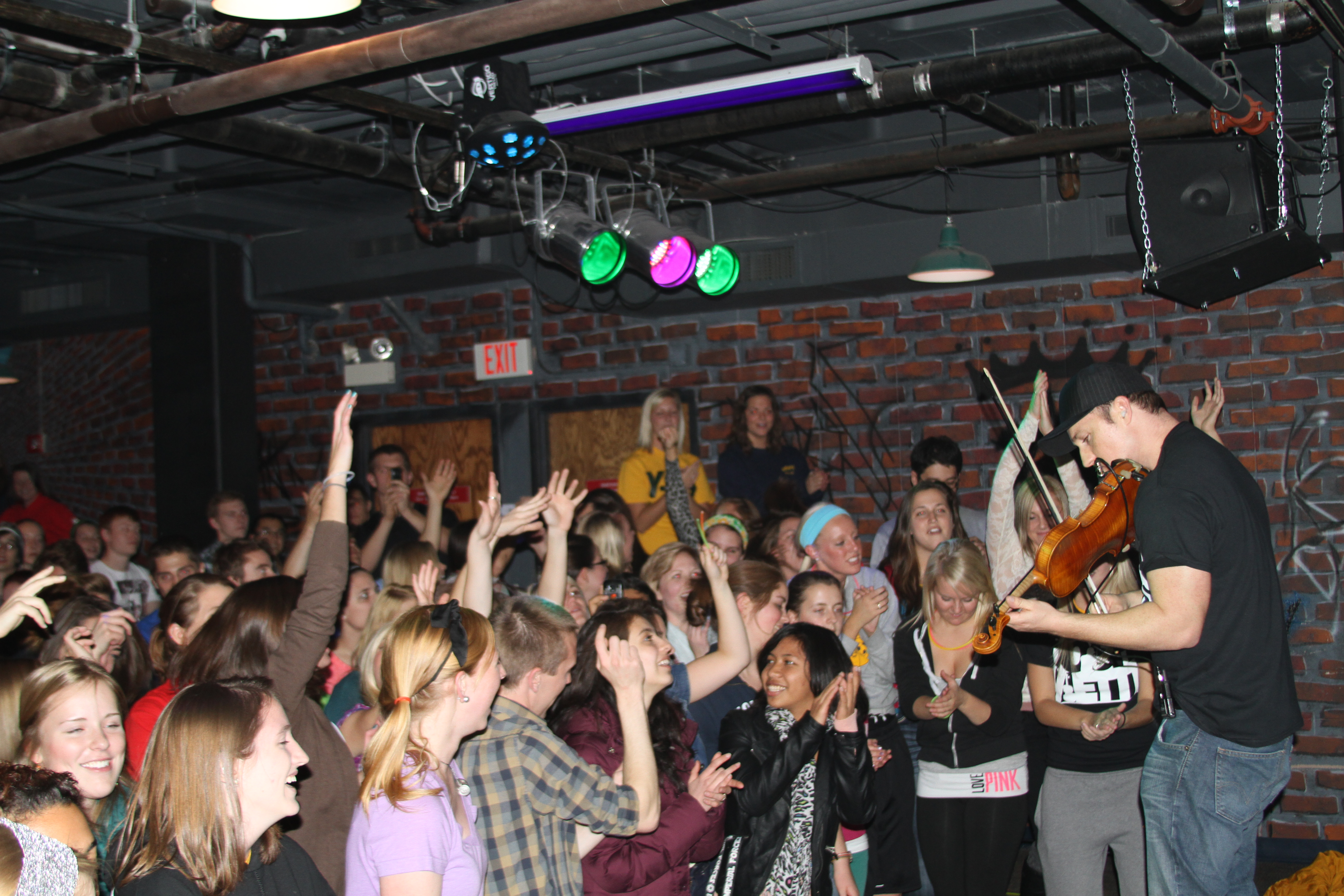
Vietti performing in 2012

In 2014, Vietti's violin arrangement of 50 Cent's "In da Club" became the musical accompaniment to "The Journey", a recurring spoken-word segment on ESPN's Sunday NFL Countdown.

In December 2014, Vietti appeared live in ESPN's studio during Sunday NFL Countdown.

=== Jazz performances ===
Vietti has performed at jazz festivals and concert series in the United States. He first appeared at the Catalina Island JazzTrax Festival in 2014 and has subsequently returned to the festival.

In 2016, he appeared at the Seabreeze Jazz Festival in Panama City Beach, Florida.

In 2017, Atlanta jazz station WCLK featured Vietti in its Suite Jazz Series. WCLK described his music as incorporating pop, classical, hip-hop, R&B and gospel and reported that he had opened for David Sanborn and Gerald Albright.

In 2018, Vietti appeared on Good Day Atlanta in connection with "An Evening of Smooth Jazz" at Wolf Creek Amphitheater. FOX 5 Atlanta described him as a hip-hop and jazz violinist and reported that he had opened for Earth, Wind & Fire and Lil Wayne.

In 2024, Vietti appeared at the Jacksonville Jazz Festival.

Vietti has also performed at Carnegie Hall in New York City alongside comedians Franco Escamilla and Gabriel Iglesias.

=== Hip-hop performances and collaborations ===
Vietti's work in hip-hop has included performances with and alongside recording artists.

In December 2019, Vietti performed with Houston rapper Trae tha Truth while opening for Snoop Dogg at the House of Blues in Houston. Vietti later described being introduced to Snoop Dogg after the performance and participating in an impromptu violin and rap performance.

In 2023, Vietti and Trae tha Truth released the collaborative single "Watch Me Soar".

In 2026, Vietti performed at Trae tha Truth's TraeDay Black Tie Affair in Houston.

Vietti has also worked in the studio with French Montana and appeared on recordings including "Salam Alaykum", "Losing Weight" and "Touch the Sky".

=== 2022: 50 Cent European tour ===
In October 2022, Vietti joined 50 Cent for a series of performances in Europe. Vietti performed an original violin solo and joined portions of 50 Cent's performances, including "In da Club". His appearances included performances in Prague, Munich, Geneva and Jesolo.

Houstonia later reported that Vietti's violin interpretation of "In da Club" attracted 50 Cent's attention and led to the European tour.

The collaboration followed ESPN's use of Vietti's violin arrangement of "In da Club" on Sunday NFL Countdown in 2014.

=== 2025: NBA Paris Games ===
In January 2025, Vietti performed at two engagements during NBA Paris week. He performed for the Indiana Pacers at a private welcome dinner at the Hôtel de Ville, and separately performed for NBA Experiences at VIP events associated with the games at Accor Arena.

=== Minnesota United FC ===
Vietti has performed multiple times at Allianz Field for Minnesota United FC.

During the club's 2024 Decision Day Fan Appreciation match against St. Louis City SC, Vietti performed his original song "Above the Storm" during the pregame program as the teams took the pitch and returned for a separate halftime performance.

Vietti returned to Allianz Field in May 2025 for another halftime performance.

In the same announcement, Minnesota United reported that Vietti's recordings had accumulated more than 400 million streams across Spotify and Pandora.

== Recording career ==
Vietti has released original instrumental music as well as violin interpretations of hip-hop, pop and classical compositions.

His violin interpretation of 50 Cent's "In da Club" gained wider exposure when ESPN used the arrangement for "The Journey" on Sunday NFL Countdown in 2014.

In 2020, Vietti released Never Give Up, which included the original track "That Vibe".

In 2023, Vietti released "Watch Me Soar" with Trae tha Truth.

In 2024, he released the album Victory Lap.

In 2025, Vietti released "Istanbul Nights".

In 2026, he released Flow State and "Vivaldi Winter (Trap Remix)", a contemporary arrangement based on music from Antonio Vivaldi's The Four Seasons.

== Business activities ==
Vietti established On That Note Entertainment, Inc. in 2013.

A number of Vietti's recordings have been released through On That Note Entertainment, Inc., including Never Give Up, "Watch Me Soar" and Victory Lap.

On That Note Entertainment describes its activities as including music-industry strategy, catalog strategy, talent booking, and entertainment and event production.

== Musical style ==
Vietti is associated with hip-hop, pop and jazz violin. FOX 5 Atlanta has described him as a hip-hop and jazz violinist, while CBS Los Angeles described his music as incorporating country, gospel, pop, jazz and hip-hop alongside his classical training.

WCLK has similarly described Vietti's music as incorporating pop, classical, hip-hop, R&B and gospel.

== Discography ==
=== Albums ===
- Modern Symphony 2010 (2010)
- Street Violin (2011)
- Best of Both Worlds (2012)
- Play to Win (2015)
- Strings Attached (2019)
- Lit Christmas (2020)
- Never Give Up (2020)
- Strings Attached, Vol. 2 (2020)
- String God (2023)
- Victory Lap (2024)
- Flow State (2026)

=== Selected songs ===
- "In da Club" – violin interpretation of the 50 Cent song
- "That Vibe"
- "Side Quest"
- "Watch Me Soar" – with Trae tha Truth
- "Istanbul Nights"
- "Vivaldi Winter (Trap Remix)"
