= Stephen C. O'Connell =

American judge

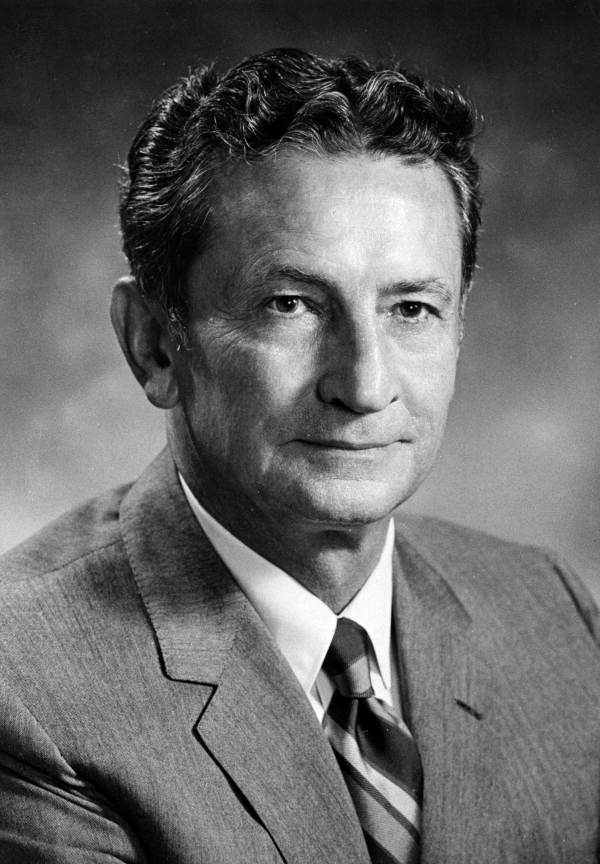
- O'Connell in 1976

6th President of the University of Florida
- In office 1967–1973
- Preceded by: J. Wayne Reitz
- Succeeded by: Robert Q. Marston

Chief Justice of the Florida Supreme Court
- In office July 1, 1967 – October 15, 1967
- Preceded by: B. Campbell Thornal
- Succeeded by: Millard F. Caldwell

Justice of the Supreme Court of Florida
- In office October 21, 1954 – July 1, 1967
- Appointed by: LeRoy Collins
- Preceded by: Harold L. Sebring
- Succeeded by: Wade L. Hopping

Personal details
- Born: January 22, 1916 West Palm Beach, Florida, U.S.
- Died: April 13, 2001 (aged 85) Tallahassee, Florida, U.S.
- Spouse(s): Rita Mavis McTigue O'Connell; Cynthia Bowling O'Connell
- Education: University of Florida (BS, LLB)
- Occupation: Attorney; Florida Supreme Court Justice; University President

Stephen Cornelius O'Connell (January 22, 1916 – April 13, 2001) was an American attorney, appellate judge and university president. O'Connell was a native of Florida, and earned bachelor's and law degrees before becoming a practicing attorney. He later was chosen to be a justice of the Florida Supreme Court from 1955 to 1967, and served as the sixth president of the University of Florida from 1967 to 1973.

== Early life and education ==
Stephen O'Connell was born in West Palm Beach, Florida in 1916, and he attended public schools in West Palm Beach and Titusville, Florida. After graduating from high school, he attended the University of Florida from 1934 to 1940, where he was a member, and later president, of Alpha Tau Omega fraternity (Alpha Omega chapter). While he was an undergraduate student, he was elected president of the sophomore class, the student body and Florida Blue Key leadership society. He was also a star athlete and the captain of the Florida Gators varsity boxing team, set the university record for fastest knock-out—twelve seconds including the count—won the Southeastern Conference (SEC) middleweight boxing championship, and was later inducted into the University of Florida Athletic Hall of Fame as a "Distinguished Letter Winner." O'Connell completed both his Bachelor of Science degree from the College of Business Administration and his Bachelor of Laws degree from the College of Law in 1940.

== War, law and politics ==
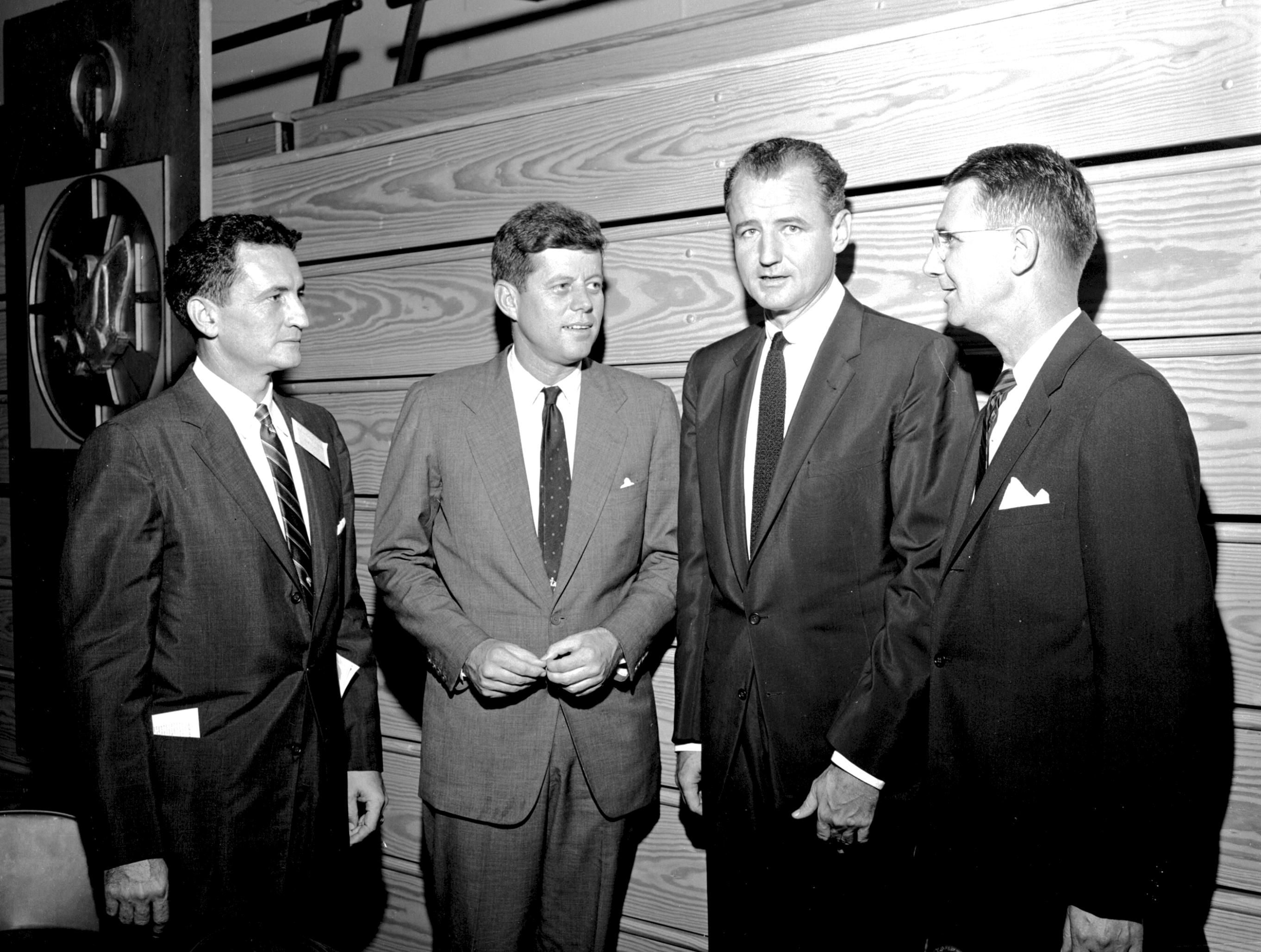
O'Connell, Senators John F. Kennedy and George Smathers, and University of Florida President J. Wayne Reitz at a Florida Blue Key event in 1957.

After briefly practicing law in Fort Lauderdale, Florida, O'Connell accepted an appointment as the civilian director of physical training for the U.S. Third Air Force in Tampa, Florida, and thereafter entered active duty service with U.S. Army Air Corps when the United States entered World War II after the Japanese attack on Pearl Harbor. During the war, he served with the U.S. Fifth Air Force in Brisbane, Australia and as executive officer of the 312th Bombardment Group in the western Pacific, and completed his war-time service as a major.

O'Connell married Rita McTigue after he returned from the war, and restarted his Fort Lauderdale law practice in 1946. He also became an active member of the Broward County Democratic Party, and participated in the gubernatorial and senatorial campaign organizations of Dan McCarty, George Smathers and LeRoy Collins.

In appreciation of his loyal work on behalf of the Democratic Party, Florida Governor LeRoy Collins appointed O'Connell as a justice the Florida Supreme Court in 1955. His time on the state supreme court followed the U.S. Supreme Court's decision striking down "separate but equal" segregation as violating due process in Brown v. Board of Education in 1954, and O'Connell's judicial philosophy was characterized by conservatism and gradualist integration. It was O'Connell's belief that, despite the Supreme Court's decision three years earlier, integration should be further delayed because "violence in university communities and a critical disruption of the university system would occur if Negro students are permitted to enter the state white universities at this time, including the Law School of the University of Florida, of which it is an integral part." State Ex Rel. Hawkins v. Board of Control, 83 So.2d 20 (1957).

His fellow justices elected him chief justice of the court in 1967, in which position he would serve only briefly. O'Connell served on the court until the Florida Board of Regents selected him to be the president of the University of Florida later in 1967.

== University president ==
O'Connell was the sixth president of the University of Florida in Gainesville, Florida, and the first alumnus of the university to be appointed as its president. When O'Connell assumed the presidency of the university in 1967, the student protest movement was peaking nationwide, and numerous demonstrations, both peaceful and militant, were held on the Florida campus during his six-year term. Faculty-administration relations were also strained, because many professors were sympathetic to the student protesters and their various social and political goals.

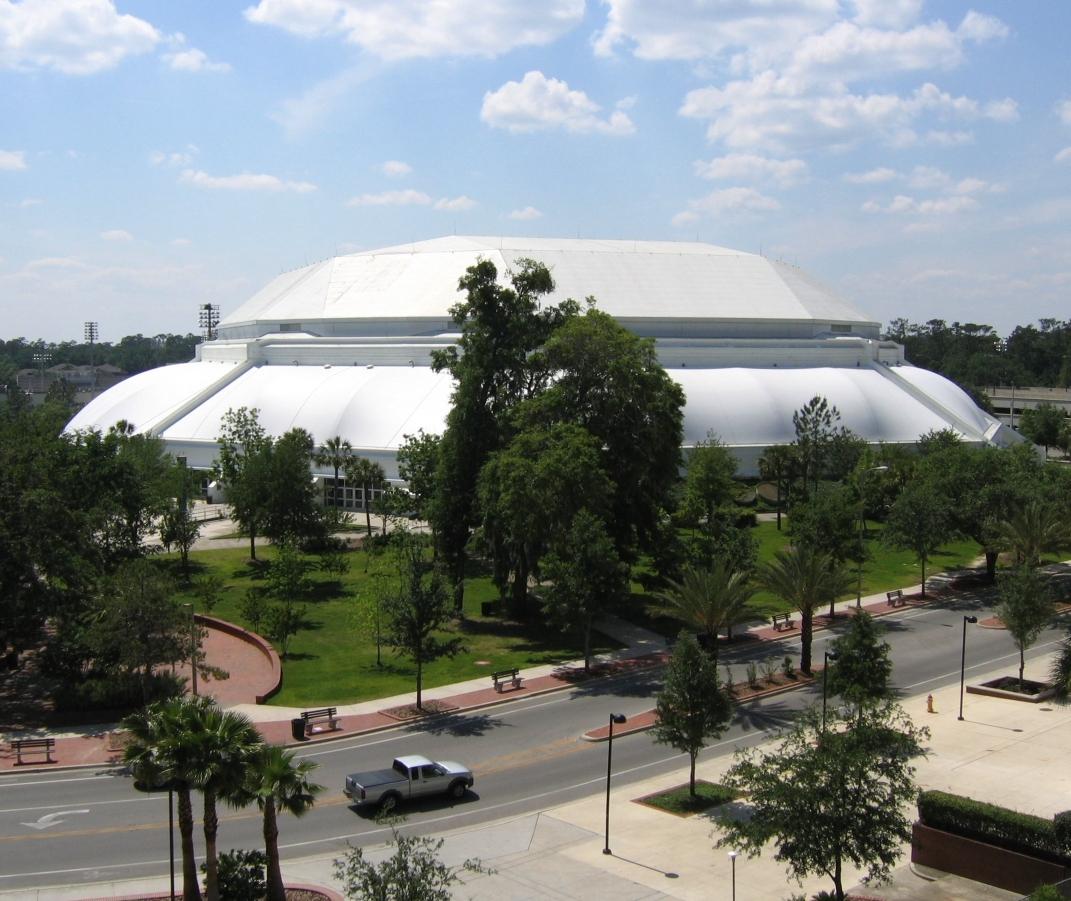
Southeastern exterior view of the Stephen C. O'Connell Center, the principal in-door sports arena on the Gainesville, Florida campus of the University of Florida. The "O'Dome" was named for Stephen C. O'Connell, the sixth president of the university (1967–1973).

O'Connell's administration canceled classes on May 6, 1970, the day after the Kent State shootings, and declared a day of mourning. It was the first time classes had been canceled at the University of Florida during his administration.

The University of Florida had integrated racially in 1958 without violence and with little protest. By the 1967 fall term, however, only sixty-one black students were enrolled, and many black students were actually foreign exchange students. The Black Student Union organized a sit-in protest inside the university president's office suite on April 15, 1971; the students were demanding a black cultural center. The occupation ended with the peaceful arrest of sixty-six students, after O'Connell had threatened them with expulsion. In the aftermath of the sit-in, O'Connell refused to grant complete amnesty to the student demonstrators who had participated, and 125 of the university's black students and several black faculty members left the university in protest.

On balance, O'Connell's administration did much to further integrate African-Americans into the mainstream of the University of Florida's academic life. When he assumed the presidency in 1967, there were sixty-one black students and no black professors; when O'Connell retired in 1973, 642 black students were enrolled, a ten-fold increase, and the faculty included nineteen black professors.

O'Connell's critics accused him of obvious racial and political animus in his sometimes hard-line decisions, many of which were documented in the student newspaper and other media. When thousands of UF students went on strike following the Kent State killings by National Guardsmen, O'Connell sought confrontation rather than communication. Heavily armed police and state law enforcement were deterred from attacking student demonstrators only by the intervention of UF football players, who had also joined the strike. (Florida Alligator, May 7, 1970). There were disruptions and demonstrations for more than a week. (Creative Loafing, August 7, 2004, "We Overcame Once," by John Sugg.) The campus was also interrupted by building takeovers after O'Connell banned literature from campus, including a humor magazine called The Charlatan. (Sitting in and Speaking Out: Student Movements in the American South, 1960-1970, by Jeffrey A. Turner, p. 160)

O'Connell's greatest long-term impact may have been the reorganization of the University of Florida Alumni Association and the creation of an Office of Development staffed by professional fundraisers. The reorganization of the alumni association and advancement program led to the rapid growth of the university's endowment over the years following his presidency. O'Connell began a reversal of policy and attitudes among many state legislators and academics who had previously opposed large-scale private fund-raising and endowment of the Florida's public universities.

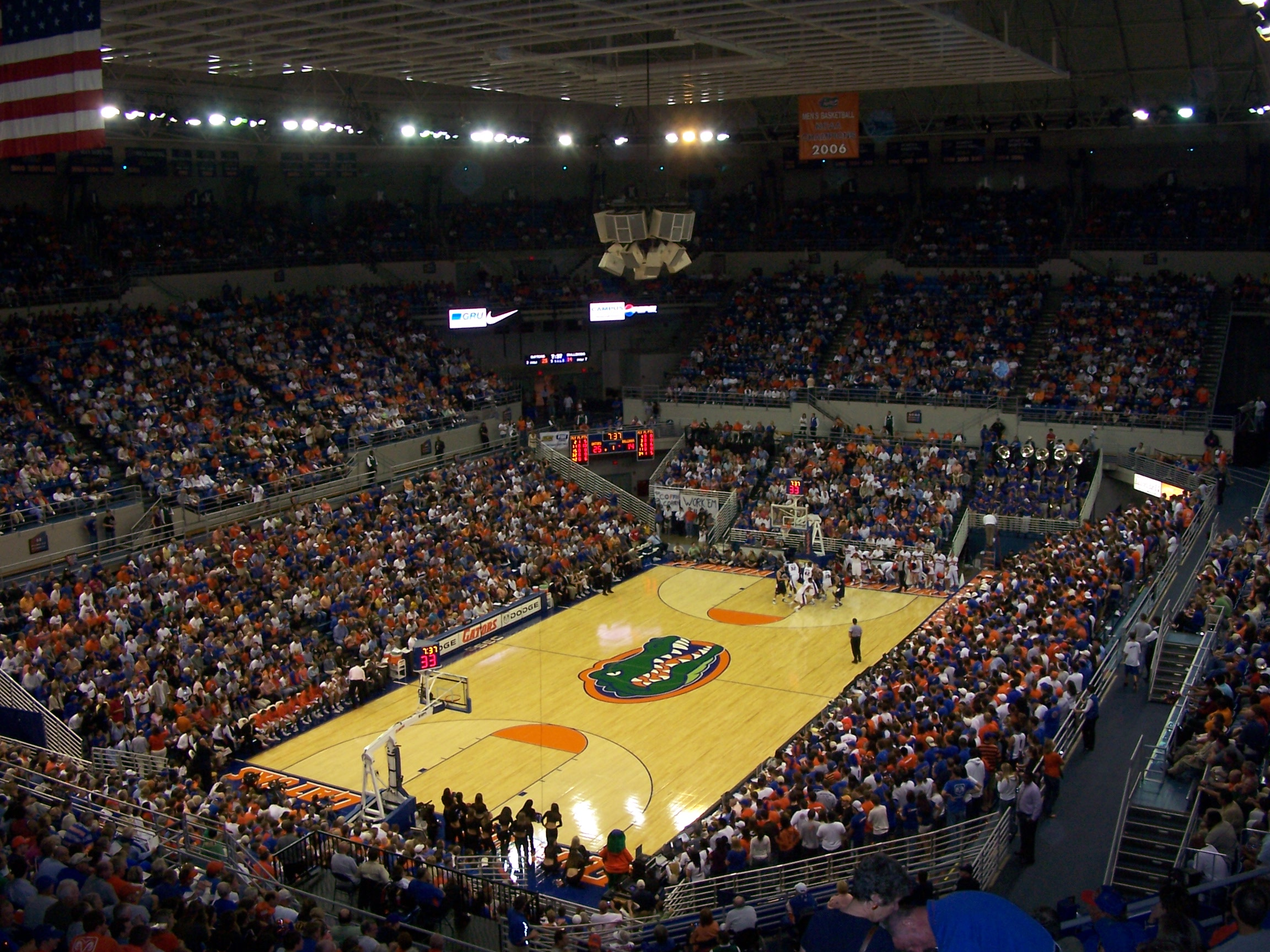
Interior of the University of Florida's multi-purpose sports arena, the O'Connell Center, configured for a Florida Gators men's basketball game.

== Return to private life ==
O'Connell announced his resignation on June 28, 1973. He did not provide a specific reason, but it was known that his wife was ill with diabetes. After retiring as university president, he returned to his home in Tallahassee, restarted his law practice, remained active in university affairs, and engaged in cattle ranching. O'Connell later became the chairman and chief executive officer of Lewis State Bank, then the oldest bank in Florida, and held that position until 1983. Thereafter, he returned to the active practice of law in Tallahassee in partnership with a Tampa-based firm.

When its construction was completed in 1980, the Stephen C. O'Connell Center was named for O'Connell in recognition of his service to his alma mater. The multi-purpose athletic arena and entertainment venue is located on the Gainesville campus of the University of Florida, and is known to students as the "O'Dome."

O'Connell died on his cattle ranch near Tallahassee, on April 13, 2001, at the age of 85. O'Connell was preceded in death by his first wife, Rita McTigue O'Connell, and his son, Martin O'Connell. He was survived by his second wife, Cynthia Bowling O'Connell, three children, Denise Marcum, Stephen O’Connell Jr, Ann Stuart, and eight grandchildren. Cynthia O'Connell served on the University of Florida Board of Trustees until 2011.

== See also ==
- Florida Gators
- History of Florida
- History of the University of Florida
- List of Alpha Tau Omega brothers
- List of Levin College of Law graduates
- List of University of Florida alumni
- List of University of Florida Athletic Hall of Fame members
- List of University of Florida honorary degree recipients
- List of University of Florida presidents
- State University System of Florida

== Bibliography ==
- McEwen, Tom, The Gators: A Story of Florida Football, The Strode Publishers, Huntsville, Alabama (1974). ISBN 0-87397-025-X.
- Pleasants, Julian M., Gator Tales: An Oral History of the University of Florida, University of Florida, Gainesville, Florida (2006). ISBN 0-8130-3054-4.
- Proctor, Samuel, & Wright Langley, Gator History: A Pictorial History of the University of Florida, South Star Publishing Company, Gainesville, Florida (1986). ISBN 0-938637-00-2.
- Van Ness, Carl, & Kevin McCarthy, Honoring the Past, Shaping the Future: The University of Florida, 1853–2003, University of Florida, Gainesville, Florida (2003).
