= White Springs Historic District =

Historic district in Florida, United States

- U.S. National Register of Historic Places
- U.S. Historic district
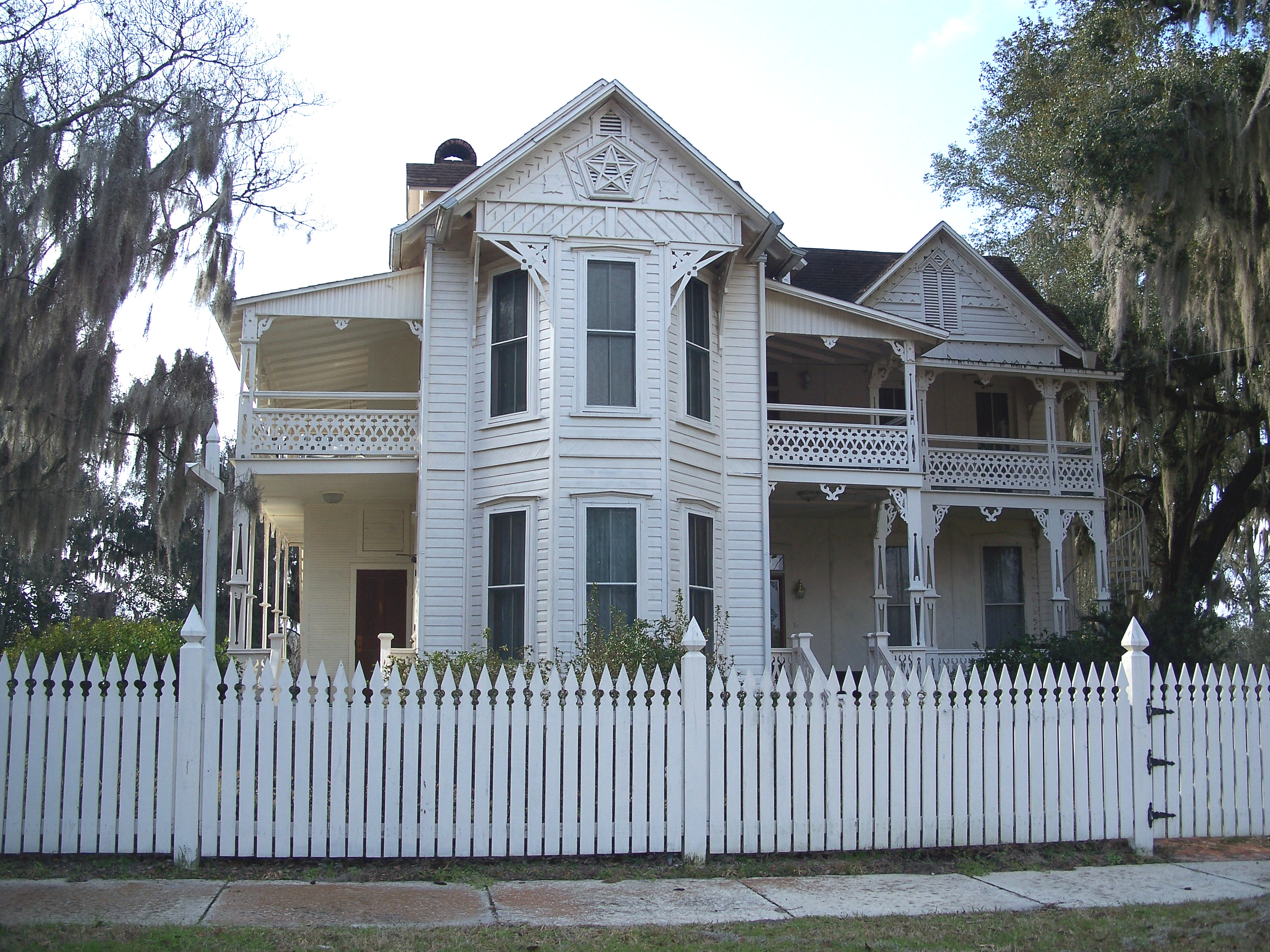
- Adams House, in the district

- Location within Florida Location within the United States
- Location: White Springs, Florida
- Coordinates: 30°19′59″N 82°45′45″W
- Area: 1,200 acres (490 ha)
- Built: 1840-1957
- Architect: A.J. Bynum
- Architectural style: Queen Anne, Late Gothic Revival, Colonial Revival
- NRHP reference No.: 97001143
- Added to NRHP: September 19, 1997

The White Springs Historic District is a historic district in White Springs, Florida. It is bounded by River Street, 1st Street, Suwannee Street, Hewitt Street, SR 25A, U.S. 41 and Suwannee Road, encompasses approximately 1,200 acres (4.9 km^{2}), and contains 81 historic buildings and 1 object. The district was added to the U.S. National Register of Historic Places on September 19, 1997.
