= Eric Stanley (EP) =

EP by Eric Stanley
- Released: July 10, 2015
- Recorded: 2015
- Genre: Classical crossover
- Length: 23:49

Eric Stanley is the first and only extended play (EP) released by American violinist, Eric Stanley. The EP was officially released on 10 July 2015, three months after Stanley's national debut on ESPN's First Take. The EP included four tracks ("Voltaire", "Another Year", "Stay Inspired" and "Amazing Grace").

== Track listing ==
No.	Title	Length
1.	"Voltaire"	4:21
2.	"Another Year"	3:36
3.	"Stay Inspired"	2:14
4.	"Amazing Grace"	5:01
Total length:		15:12
