= Thinking About You (album) =

Studio album by Jerald Daemyon
- Released: 1995

Thinking About You is the debut studio album by American jazz musician Jerald Daemyon.

It produced one charting single, "Summer Madness", which reached No. 60 on the Billboard Hot R&B Singles chart on November 25, 1995.

== Critical reception ==
Lynn Norment, writing for Ebony, rated the album positively, stating in her review that "Daemyon offers rhythmically diverse music". She praised the performing, noting that he "ilicits new appreciation for his violin". Jonathan Widran, writing for AllMusic, noted that Daemyon blended traditional violin influences with modern genres, calling it a "potpurri" and commended the "fresh sound". Hilarie Grey, writing for JazzTimes, praised Daemyon's playing, calling it "versatile" and noting that he adds "nuance and intensity to an over-done formula". She criticized several of the songs for not focusing on the violin playing, calling tracks like "13" a "cold grove" that "detracts from the violinist's work" while noting that the cover of "You Make Me Feel Brand New" featured "emotionless vocals".

== Charts ==
Chart (1996)	Peak position
US Billboard 200 (Billboard)	196
US Top Contemporary Jazz Albums (Billboard)	3
US Heatseekers Albums (Billboard)	8
US Top R&B Albums (Billboard)	35
