= White Springs, Florida =

Town in the state of Florida, United States

- Town
- Town of White Springs
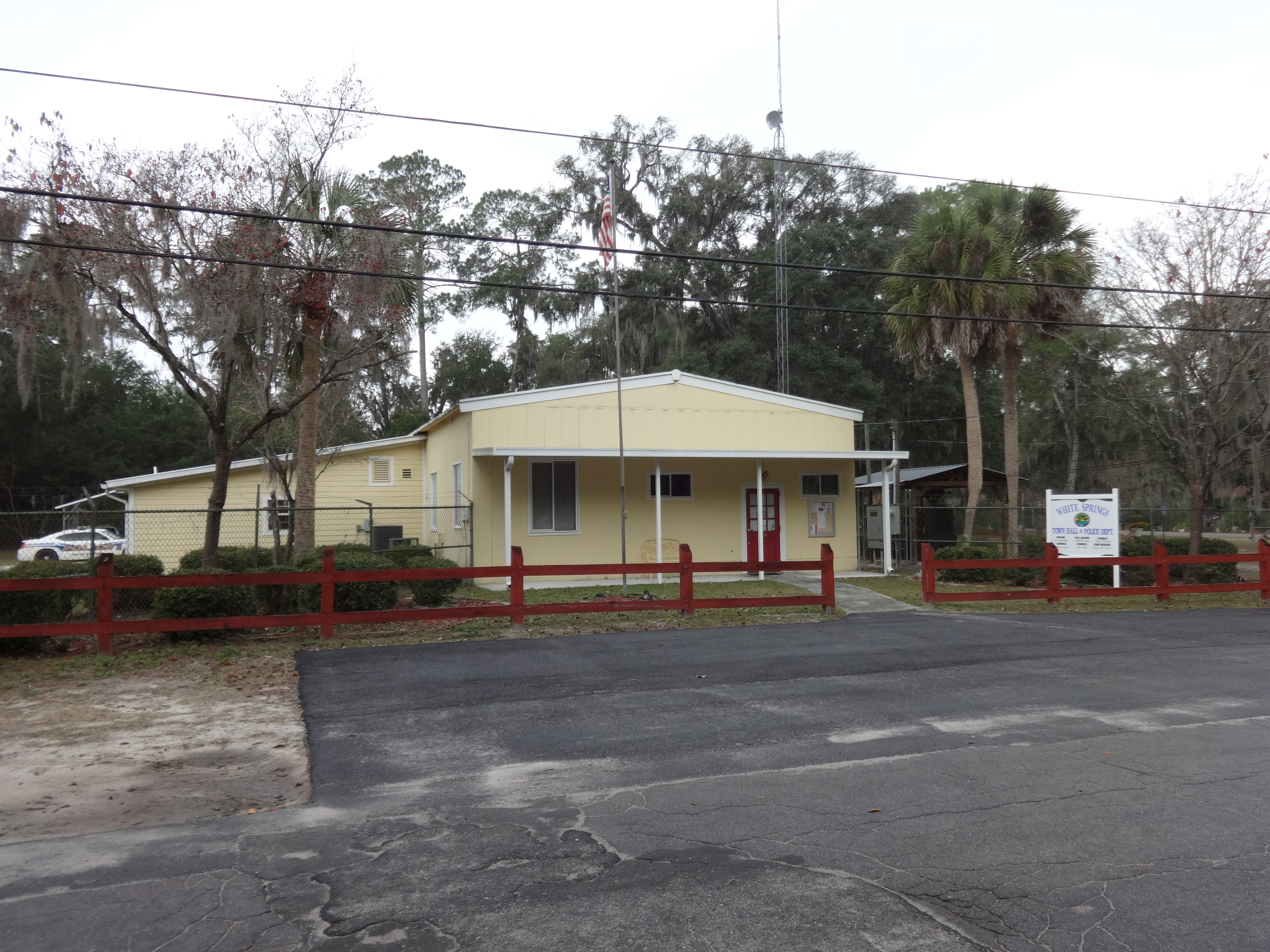
- White Springs Town Hall and Police Department

- Seal
- Motto: “On the Banks of the Suwannee River”
- Location in Hamilton County and the state of Florida
- Coordinates: 30°19′51″N 82°45′05″W
- Country: United States
- State: Florida
- County: Hamilton
- Settled (Jackson Springs): 1831
- Incorporated (Town of White Springs): 1885

Government
  - Type: Council-Manager
  - Mayor: Tonja R. Brown
  - Vice Mayor: Nicole Williams
  - Council Members: Shirley Aldridge, Robert Gamsby, and Cheryl McCall
  - Town Manager: Elmon Lee Garner
  - Town Clerk: Audre’ J. Ruise

Area
  - Total: 1.83 sq mi (4.74 km^{2})
  - Land: 1.83 sq mi (4.74 km^{2})
  - Water: 0.0039 sq mi (0.01 km^{2})
- Elevation: 118 ft (36 m)

Population (2020)
  - Total: 740
  - Density: 404.6/sq mi (156.22/km^{2})
- Time zone: UTC-5 (Eastern (EST))
  - Summer (DST): UTC-4 (EDT)
- ZIP code: 32096
- Area code: 386
- FIPS code: 12-77400
- GNIS feature ID: 2406880
- Website: www.whitesprings.org

White Springs is a town in North Florida, United States, on the Suwannee River. It was developed as a tourist attraction for its mineral spring water baths. The population was 740 at the 2020 census. Home of the annual Florida Folk Festival, it is a tourist destination noted for historic charm, antique shops, and river recreation.

== History ==
The Suwannee River was once the boundary between the Timucuan peoples to the east and the Apalachee people to the west. When Spanish explorers visited the area in the 1530s, the spring was visited by Natives from both sides of the river, who believed the water possessed healing powers. The Native Americans considered the spring a sacred healing ground, and used it even in times of war; any tribe member could bathe and drink the mineral waters without fear of being attacked. The spring water has a "rotten egg" sulfur smell that comes from dissolved hydrogen sulfide gas.

The settlement was formed in 1831 as Jackson Springs by businessmen Joseph Bryant, James T. Hooker, his brother William B. Hooker, John Lee, and James D. Prevatt. In addition to the spring, they planned to build a ferry across the Suwannee River.

The following year, Bryant Sheffield purchased the ferry operation rights and the spring, then known as "White Sulpher [sic] Springs". Sheffield drank the mineral waters and touted their ability to cure nervousness, kidney troubles, and rheumatism, among other problems. In 1842, he constructed a hotel and spring house from local timber.

During the Civil War, some Confederate soldiers found refuge in the town from Union troops. The family of future governor Napoleon Bonaparte Broward, whose Jacksonville farm was burned by Union forces, moved to a nearby farm which they named "Rebel's Refuge". At some point, the springs were renamed "White Sulphur Springs".

Following the Civil War, the tourist business slowly returned. In 1882, the Georgia merchants Wight and Powell purchased the property and platted city lots. They sold parcels to other retailers to open businesses catering to plantations and resorts around the spring. Crowds of health seekers arrived, first by stagecoach and then railroad. The Town of White Springs was incorporated as a municipality in 1885. Hotels and boarding houses popped up; a cotton gin attracted buyers and sellers; and fashionable clothing and hats were offered for sale. Leisure activities included ballroom dancing, lawn tennis, and skating.

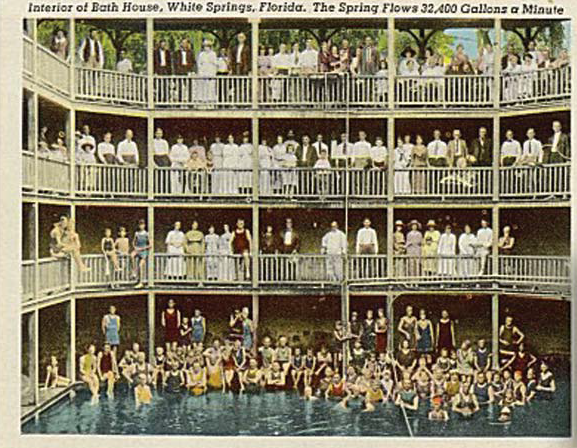
Bathhouse surrounding White Springs

In 1903, the spring was enclosed by concrete and coquina walls that included multiple water gates and galleries to prevent water intrusion from river flooding. A four-story wooden bathhouse was constructed around the spring. The structure was designed by the Jacksonville architectural firm McClure & Holmes for owner Minnie Mosher Jackson, and included doctors' offices for patient examination and treatment, dressing rooms, space for concessions, and an elevator. At the time, water flow was calculated at 32,400 gallons per minute, or nearly 47 million gallons per day.

During the 1930s, bathing in mineral springs fell out of favor in the United States and the town began to fade. In 1950, the Stephen Foster Memorial Museum opened to commemorate songwriter Stephen Foster, composer of the world-renowned song of the Suwannee River, "Old Folks at Home". The museum is surrounded by formal gardens which extend to the banks of the Suwannee River. A carillon containing the world's largest set of tubular bells, opened in 1957, and plays Foster's songs throughout the day. The facility is a Florida State Park.

Through the 1980s, water flow at the spring declined to the point when it ceased flowing in 1990. The ex-mayor of White Springs, Dr. Helen Miller, was vice chairman of Florida Leaders Organized for Water (FLOW), a group which proposed the Floridan Aquifer Sustainability Act of 2013. The legislation seeks to restore the Floridan aquifer to 1980 levels.

In 2022, a white supremacist, neo-pagan religion known as the Asatru Folk Assembly (AFA), dedicated a Viking neo-pagan temple in White Springs. The temple for the hate group is dedicated to the Viking god Njörðr (Njord) and is called "Njörðshof" which means "Njord's temple" in Old Norse, the language of the Vikings.

== Geography ==
The approximate coordinates for the Town of White Springs is located in southeastern Hamilton County. Its southern boundary follows the Suwannee River, which forms the border with Columbia County.

The town is crossed by U.S. Route 41 (SR 25 and 100) and SR 136. US 41 leads northwest 17 miles (27 km) to Jasper, the Hamilton County seat, and southeast 12 miles (19 km) to Lake City. SR 136 leads west 3 miles (5 km) to Interstate 75.

According to the United States Census Bureau, the town has a total area of 1.9 square miles (4.8 km^{2}), of which 56,330 square feet (5,233 m^{2}), or 0.11%, are water.

=== Climate ===
The climate in this area is characterized by hot, humid summers and generally mild winters. According to the Köppen climate classification, the Town of White Springs has a humid subtropical climate zone (Cfa).

Climate data for White Springs 7N, Florida, 1991–2020 normals, extremes 1999–2020
Month	Jan	Feb	Mar	Apr	May	Jun	Jul	Aug	Sep	Oct	Nov	Dec	Year
Record high °F (°C)	84 (29)	85 (29)	89 (32)	94 (34)	98 (37)	102 (39)	101 (38)	103 (39)	97 (36)	94 (34)	89 (32)	85 (29)	103 (39)
Mean daily maximum °F (°C)	65.6 (18.7)	68.7 (20.4)	74.7 (23.7)	81.0 (27.2)	87.3 (30.7)	90.7 (32.6)	93.0 (33.9)	91.9 (33.3)	88.7 (31.5)	82.0 (27.8)	74.3 (23.5)	67.6 (19.8)	80.5 (26.9)
Daily mean °F (°C)	53.7 (12.1)	57.0 (13.9)	62.3 (16.8)	68.5 (20.3)	75.1 (23.9)	80.2 (26.8)	82.6 (28.1)	82.0 (27.8)	78.8 (26.0)	70.7 (21.5)	62.0 (16.7)	56.1 (13.4)	69.1 (20.6)
Mean daily minimum °F (°C)	41.8 (5.4)	45.3 (7.4)	49.9 (9.9)	56.0 (13.3)	62.9 (17.2)	69.8 (21.0)	72.2 (22.3)	72.1 (22.3)	68.8 (20.4)	59.5 (15.3)	49.7 (9.8)	44.7 (7.1)	57.7 (14.3)
Record low °F (°C)	18 (−8)	24 (−4)	26 (−3)	37 (3)	46 (8)	61 (16)	56 (13)	61 (16)	53 (12)	30 (−1)	27 (−3)	22 (−6)	18 (−8)
Average precipitation inches (mm)	4.62 (117)	3.50 (89)	4.21 (107)	3.82 (97)	3.48 (88)	7.62 (194)	5.87 (149)	6.68 (170)	5.21 (132)	3.44 (87)	2.23 (57)	2.94 (75)	53.62 (1,362)
Source: NOAA

== Demographics ==
Historical population
Census	Pop.	Note	%±
1890	543		—
1900	690		27.1%
1910	1,177		70.6%
1920	984		−16.4%
1930	618		−37.2%
1940	600		−2.9%
1950	700		16.7%
1960	633		−9.6%
1970	767		21.2%
1980	781		1.8%
1990	704		−9.9%
2000	819		16.3%
2010	777		−5.1%
2020	740		−4.8%
U.S. Decennial Census

=== 2010 and 2020 census ===
White Springs racial composition (Hispanics excluded from racial categories) (NH = Non-Hispanic)
Race	Pop 2010	Pop 2020	% 2010	% 2020
White (NH)	363	303	46.72%	40.95%
Black or African American (NH)	376	393	48.39%	53.11%
Native American or Alaska Native (NH)	0	5	0.00%	0.68%
Asian (NH)	2	2	0.26%	0.27%
Pacific Islander or Native Hawaiian (NH)	0	0	0.00%	0.00%
Some other race (NH)	0	0	0.00%	0.00%
Two or more races/Multiracial (NH)	10	21	1.29%	2.84%
Hispanic or Latino (any race)	26	16	3.35%	2.16%
Total	777	740		

As of the 2020 United States census, there were 740 people, 464 households, and 282 families residing in the town.

As of the 2010 United States census, there were 777 people, 316 households, and 207 families residing in the town.

=== 2000 census ===
As of the census of 2000, there were 819 people, 340 households, and 227 families residing in the town. The population density was 446.0 inhabitants per square mile (172.2/km^{2}). There were 393 housing units at an average density of 214.0 per square mile (82.6/km^{2}). The racial makeup of the town was 36.75% White, 62.15% African American, 0.37% Native American, and 0.73% from two or more races. Hispanic or Latino of any race were 0.37% of the population.

In 2000, there were 340 households, out of which 33.5% had children under the age of 18 living with them, 36.2% were married couples living together, 26.2% had a female householder with no husband present, and 33.2% were non-families. 29.7% of all households were made up of individuals, and 12.1% had someone living alone who was 65 years of age or older. The average household size was 2.41 and the average family size was 2.93.

In 2000, in the town, the population was spread out, with 30.3% under the age of 18, 10.4% from 18 to 24, 26.4% from 25 to 44, 20.8% from 45 to 64, and 12.2% who were 65 years of age or older. The median age was 32 years. For every 100 females, there were 85.3 males. For every 100 females age 18 and over, there were 75.7 males.

In 2000, the median income for a household in the town was $24,861, and the median income for a family was $32,115. Males had a median income of $31,953 versus $21,250 for females. The per capita income for the town was $15,555. About 20.0% of families and 22.6% of the population were below the poverty line, including 22.3% of those under age 18 and 26.6% of those age 65 or over.

== Education ==
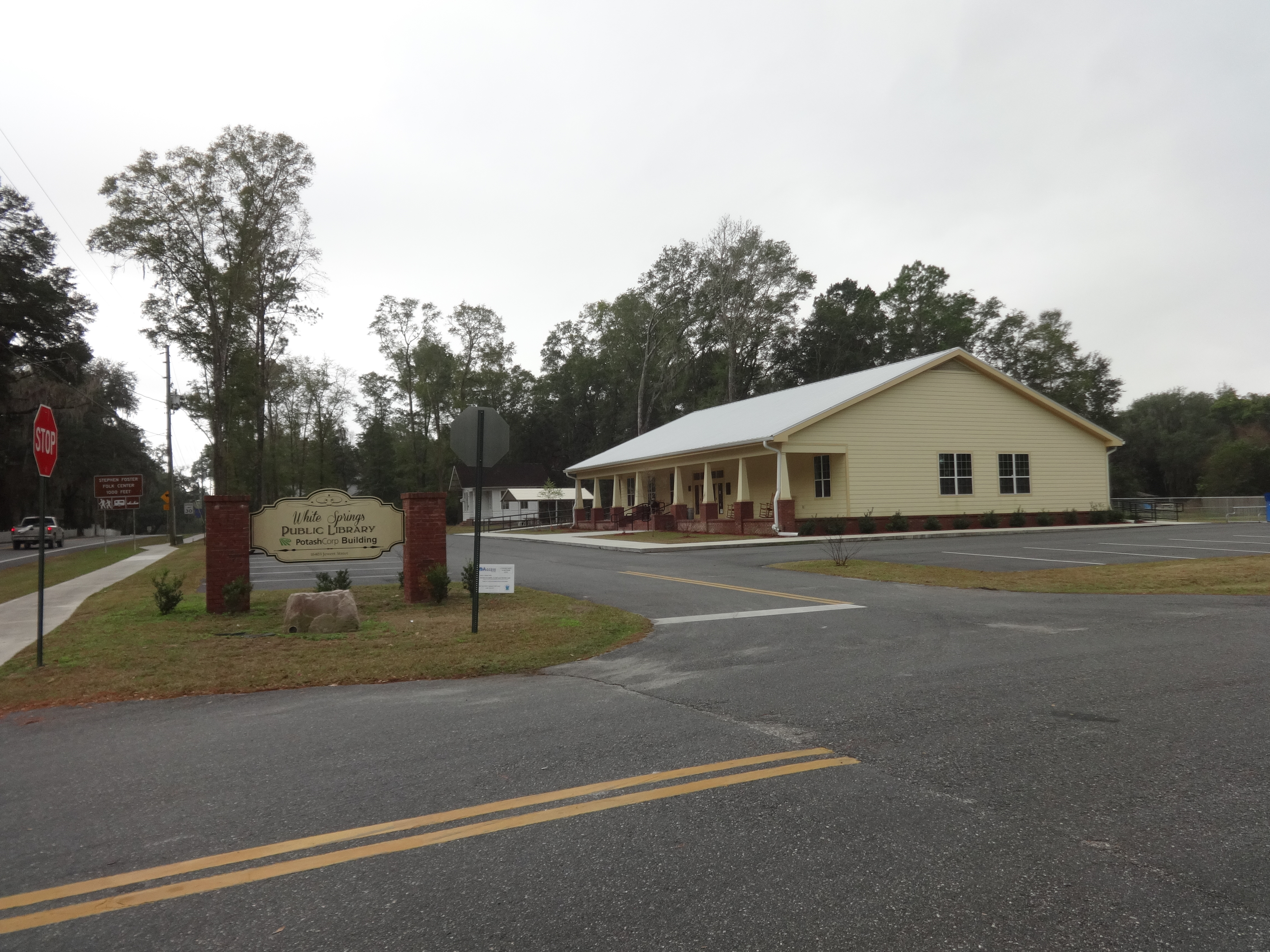
White Springs Library

The Hamilton County School District operates the public schools serving White Springs, Hamilton County Elementary School and Hamilton County High School, both in an unincorporated area of the county.

South Hamilton Elementary School in White Springs formerly served the city; it was consolidated into a new elementary school, Hamilton County Elementary School, located in an unincorporated area south of Jasper. Its opening was scheduled for August 2017.

The Suwannee River Regional Library System operates the White Springs Public Library.

== Historic architecture ==
Many of the original Victorian buildings survive, particularly within the White Springs Historic District, established in 1997 by the National Register of Historic Places.

== Florida Folk Festival ==
The town and state park are the site of the annual Florida Folk Festival, a four-day celebration of traditional Florida food, arts, and music. The event, first held in 1953, is one of the oldest continuous folk festivals in the United States.

== Notable people ==
- Harry H. Gleaton (1906–1998), member of the Florida House of Representatives
- Albion W. Knight (1859–1936), coadjutor bishop of New Jersey
- Ivy Julia Cromartie Stranahan (1881–1971), suffragist, activist, and educator

== Gallery ==
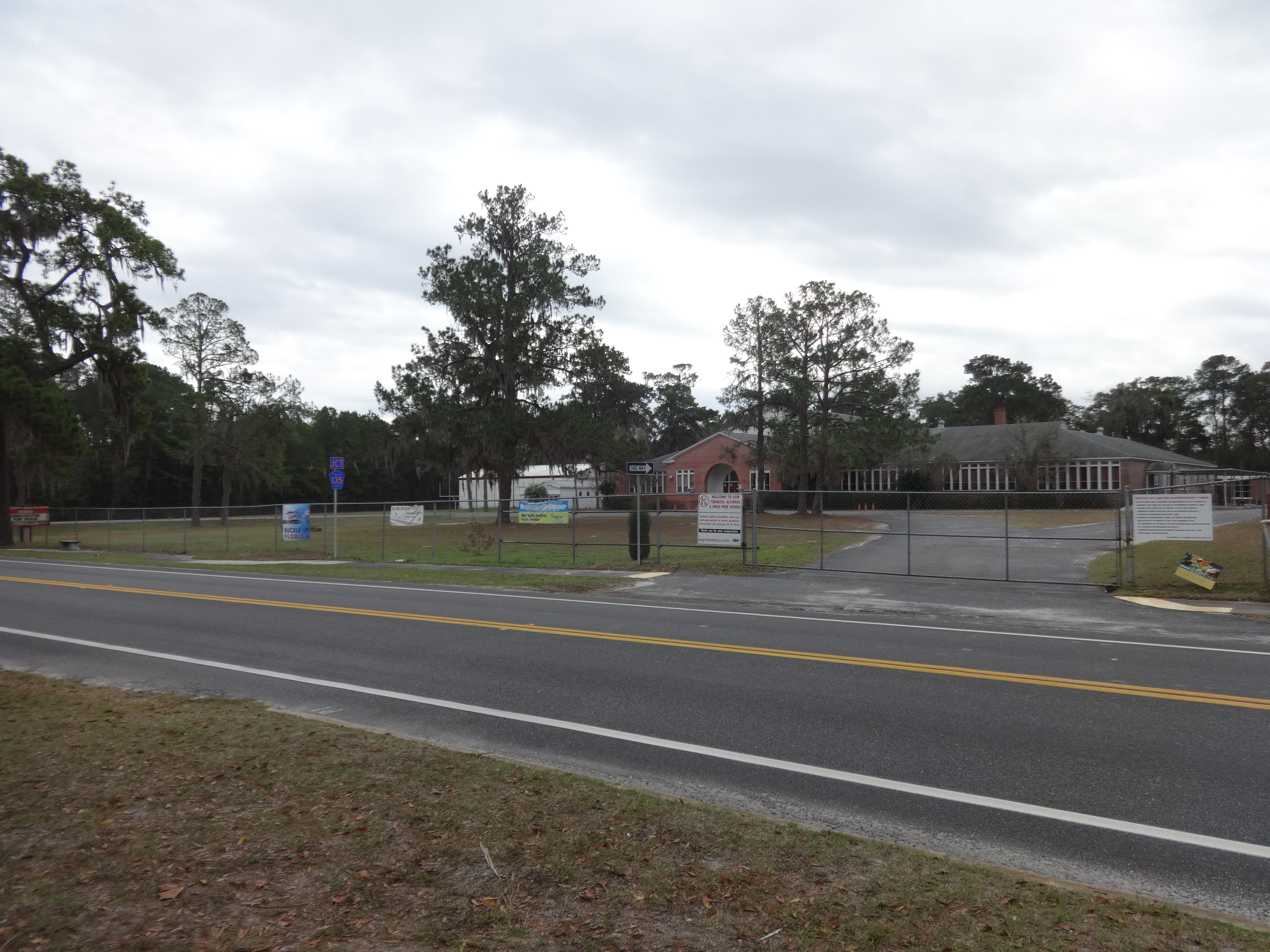
South Hamilton Elementary School (now closed)

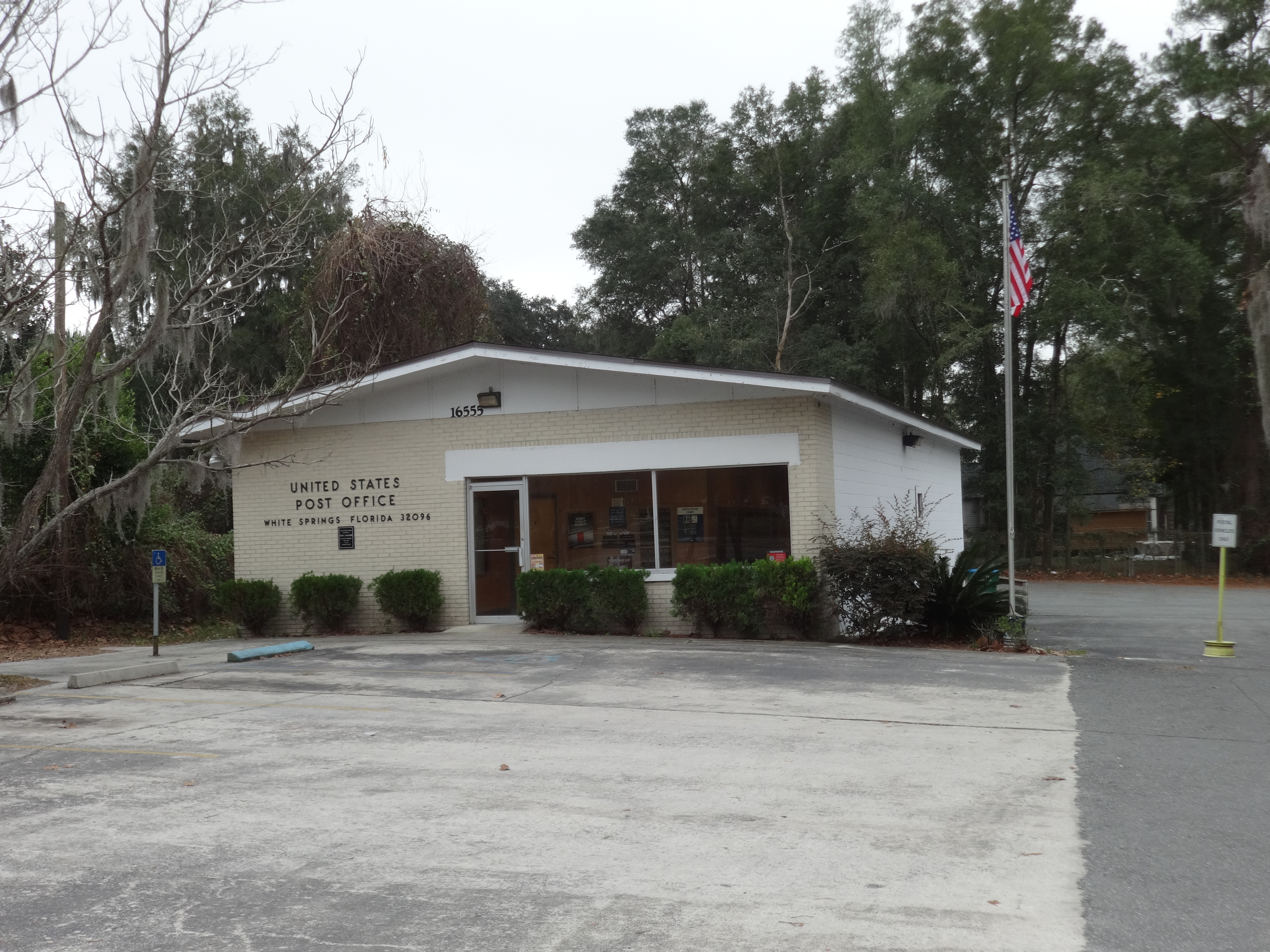
White Springs Post Office

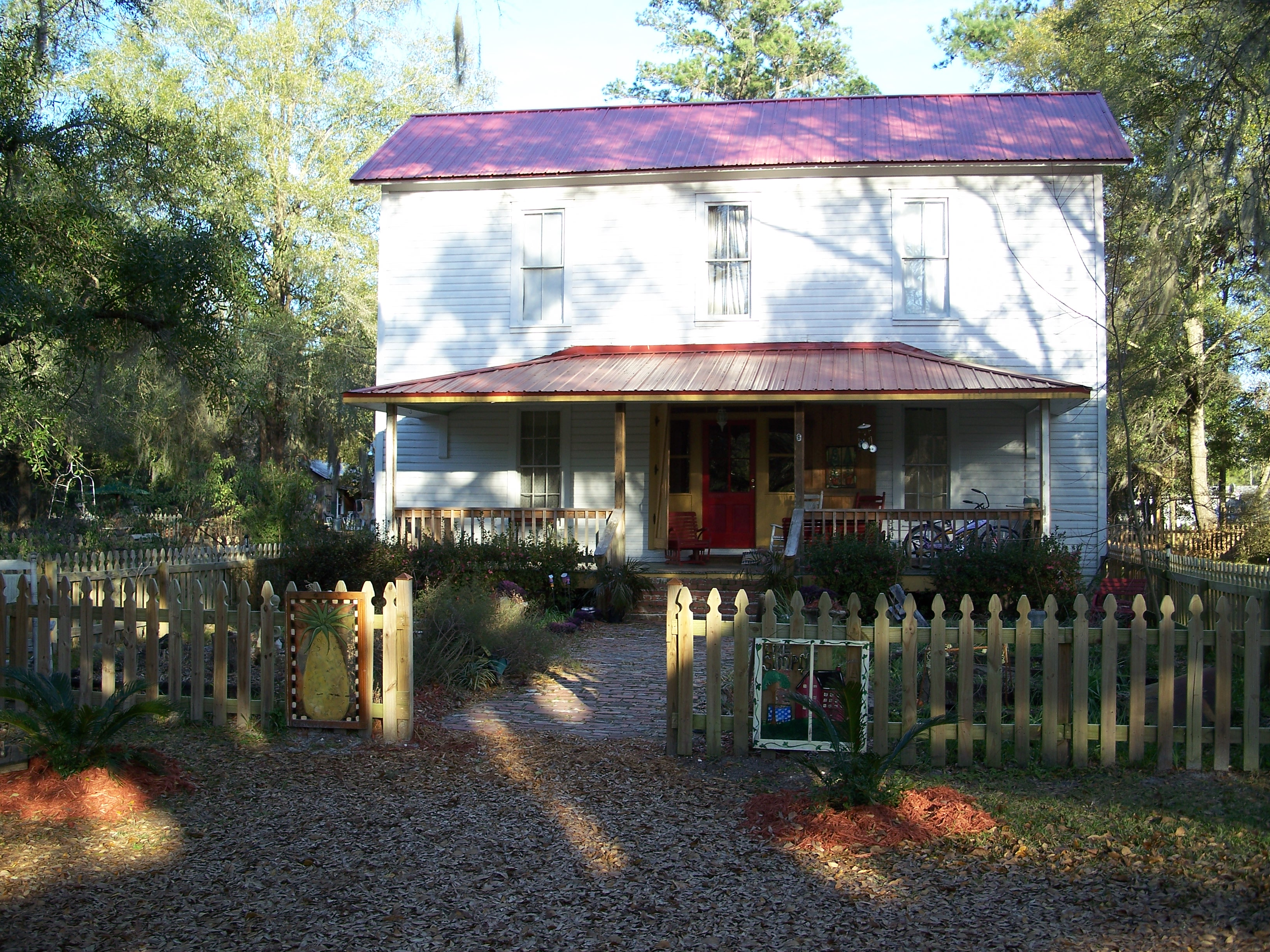
Historic Johns House

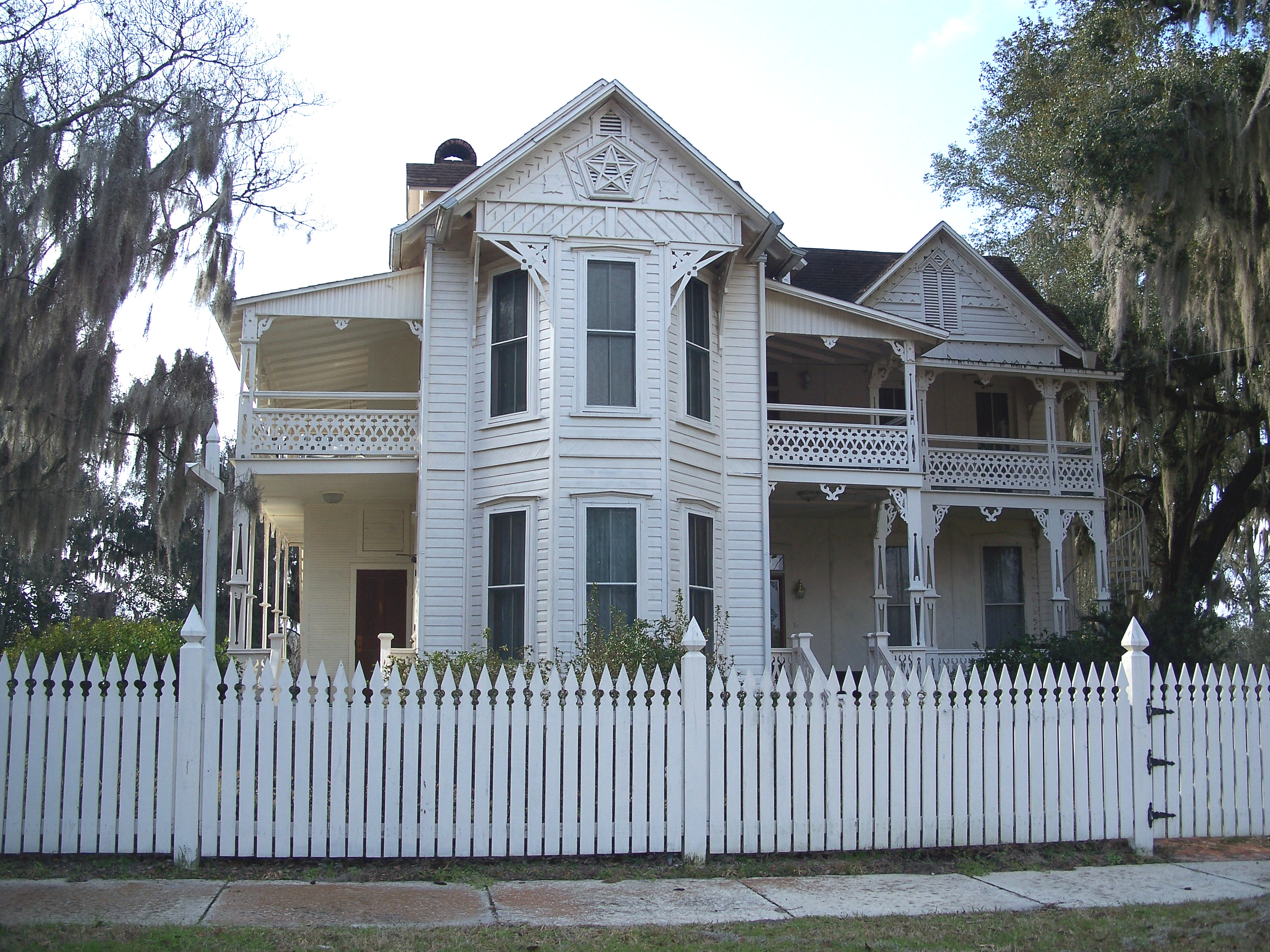
Adams House in the historic district

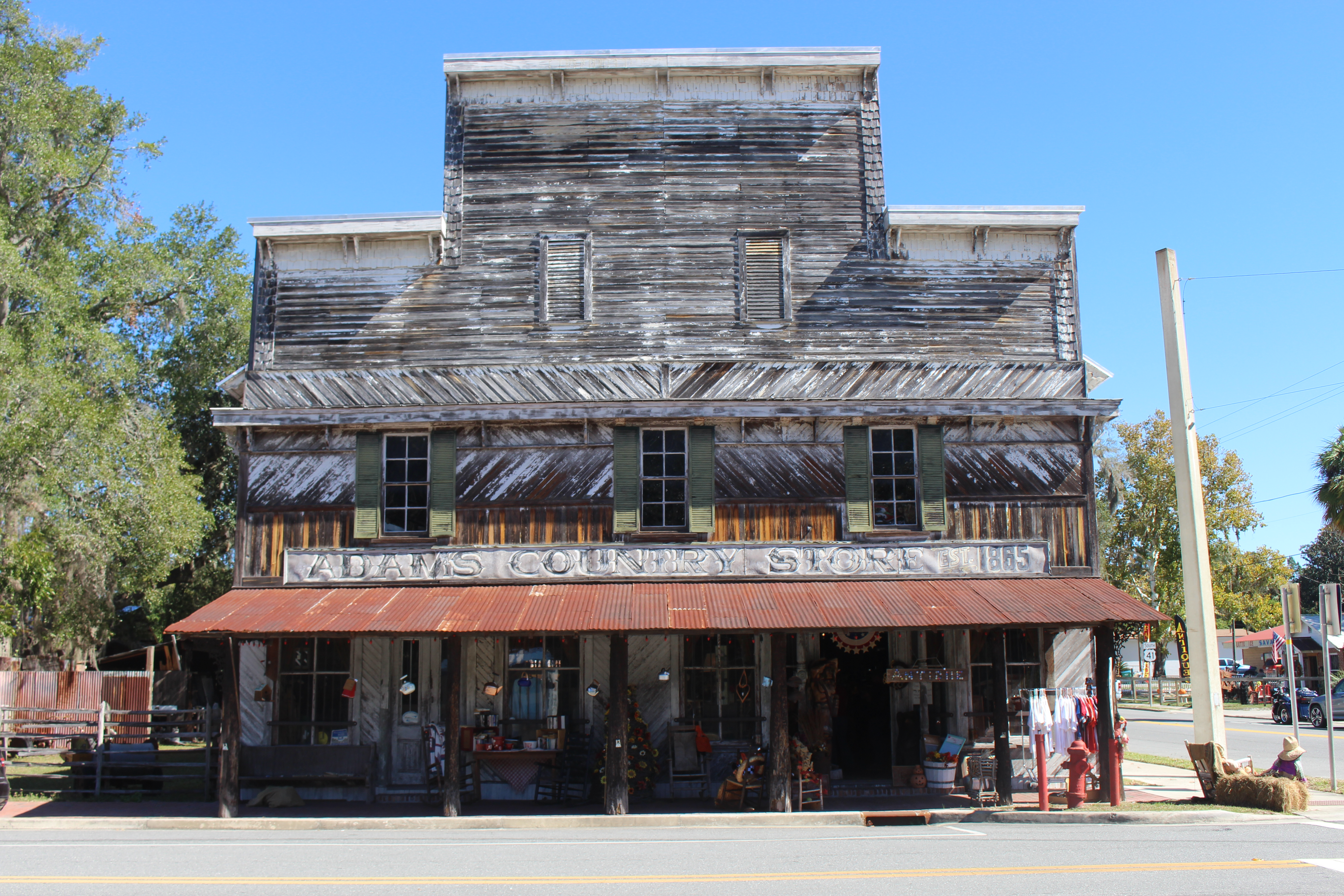
Adams Country Store

== See also ==
- Suwannee River Water Management District
