= Eric Stanley (violinist) =

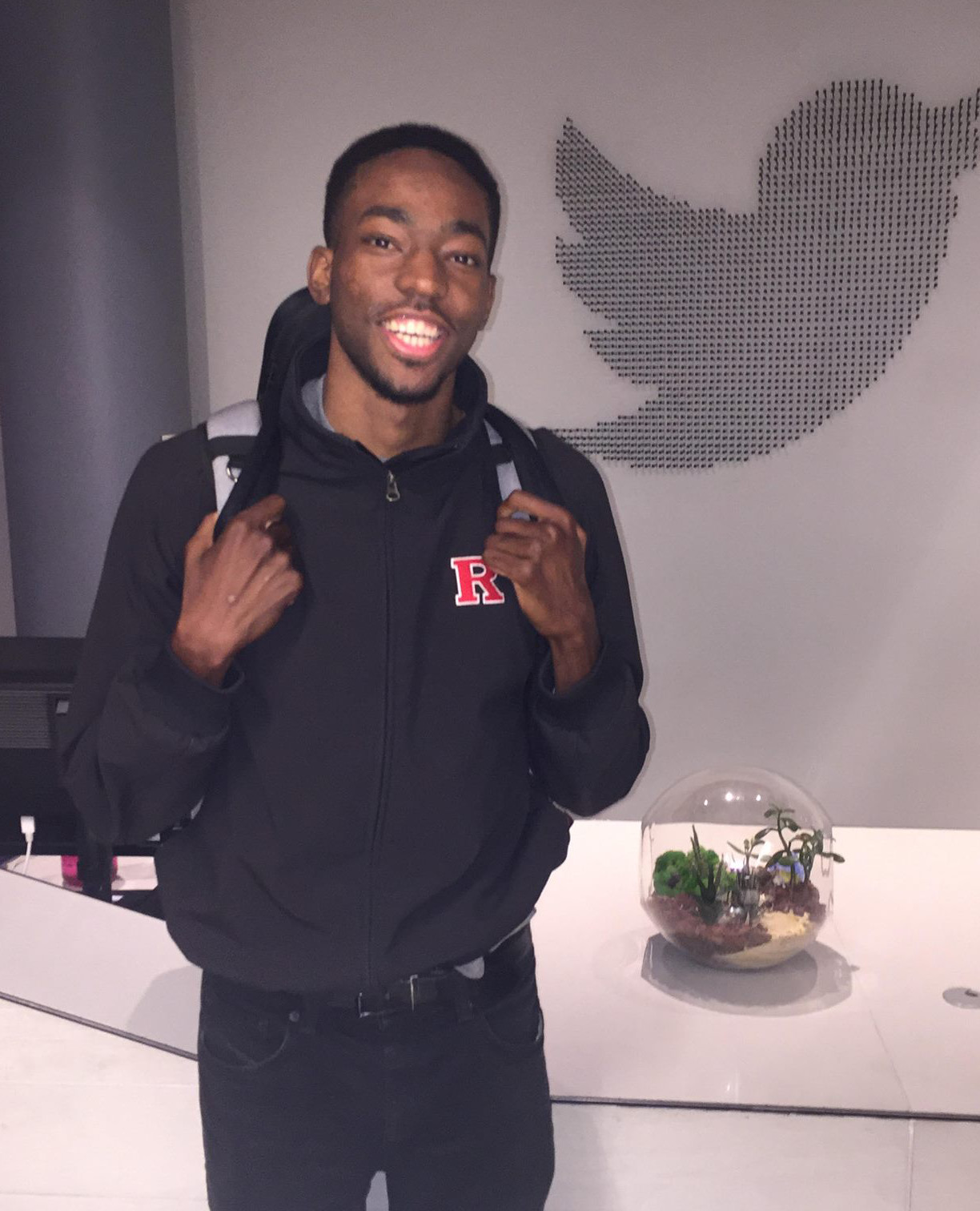
- Stanley at Twitter headquarters in 2017
- Born: April 19, 1991 (age 35); Chesapeake, Virginia, U.S.
- Education: Virginia Commonwealth University
- Occupations: Hedge fund manager; musician; programmer; entrepreneur
- Years active: 2009–present
- Known for: Co-founder of Stay Inspired, Stay Inspired Capital
- Relatives: Anhayla Stanley (sister); Marcus Stanley (brother)
- Musical career
- Genres: Pop; hip hop; classical crossover
- Instrument: Violin
- Website: ericstanleystore.com

Eric Stanley (born April 19, 1991) is an American hedge fund manager, violinist, programmer, and entrepreneur. He is the founder of Stay Inspired, a media company. Stanley is the co-founder of Stay Inspired Capital, a quantitative hedge fund. He and his fund are known to be quantitative investors, using trading algorithms and mathematical models to make investment gains from market inefficiencies.

He presents improvisational violin performances found on his YouTube channel, Estan247, which was created in 2009. In April 2015, Stanley made his national television debut on ESPN First Take and provided the theme song on violin.

== Early life ==
Stanley was born in Chesapeake, Virginia and comes from a family of musicians. He has an older brother named Marcus (born 1985), who is a pianist, and an older sister, Anhayla (born 1988), a singer. He attended Short Pump Middle School in Richmond, Virginia. With the encouragement of his teachers, Stanley began playing the violin at age 12. When he entered high school, Stanley joined the Richmond Symphony Youth Orchestra.

== Career ==
=== Music ===
In 2009, at the age of 18, Stanley began posting videos on Internet websites YouTube, WorldStarHipHop, and PerezHilton.com. Stanley has experimented in combining improvisational violin playing with hip hop, pop, and classical. One of his first videos was a violin cover of Say Ahh by R&B artist Trey Songz. Other songs included Love the Way You Lie and Airplanes. During 2011 Stanley released The Eric Stanley Project, a mixtape. In 2011, he became a "viral sensation" and performed as the opening act for rapper B.o.B. In 2011, Stanley performed for President Bill Clinton in Orlando, Florida. He attended Virginia Commonwealth University, graduating in 2014.

Following Stanley's performance on ESPN First Take, he announced the release of his debut EP Eric Stanley. In September 2016, he produced the soundtrack at New York Fashion Week for a presentation of the KLS collection by Kimora Lee Simmons.

=== Investment ===
In 2019, Stanley co-founded Stay inspired Capital with Daniel D. in Charleston, South Carolina. The firm uses mathematical models and algorithms within the equities markets.

=== Philanthropy ===
Stanley has visited more than 200 K–12 schools across the United States to "help young students stay inspired." In April 2017, he worked with Newark Public Schools to raise $2,424 to purchase 20 violins for the students.

On July 20, 2017, Stanley joined Usher's New Look for the Disruptive Innovation Summit in Atlanta. The non-profit organization presented the event in SunTrust Park. Usher's mission was "to have a creative gathering of forward thinking youth leaders."

== Discography ==
=== Extended plays (EPs) ===
- Eric Stanley (2015)

=== Singles ===
| Year | Title |
|---|---|
| 2015 | "Voltaire" |

== Filmography ==
Television
| Year | Show | Role | Notes |
|---|---|---|---|
| 2015 | ESPN First Take | Himself | 5 episodes |

== See also ==
- List of Internet entrepreneurs
- List of popular music violinists
- List of YouTubers
