= DSharp =

American violinist, DJ, singer and producer

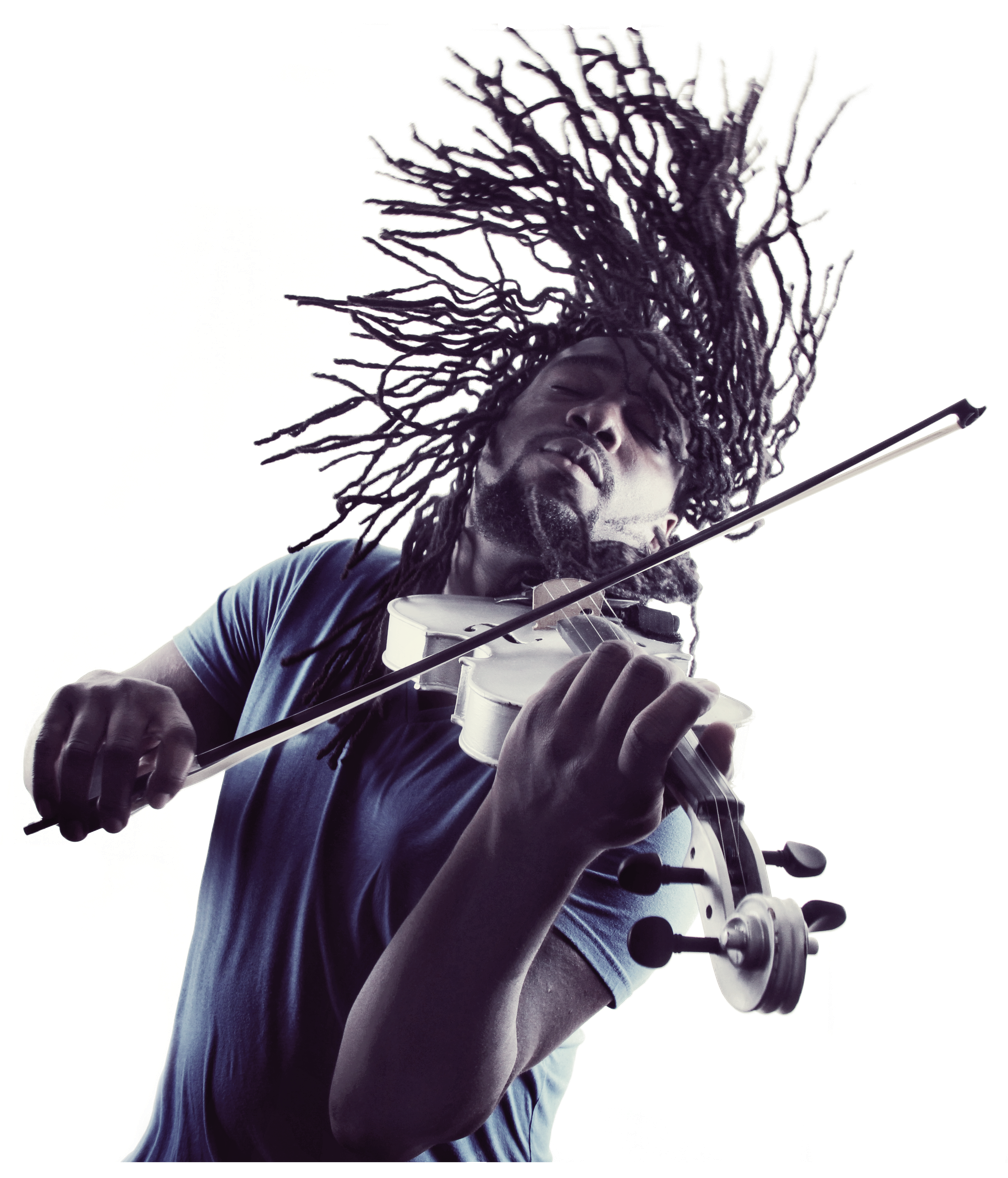

Background information
- Born: Derryck Gleaton; 30 August 1988 (age 37); South Carolina
- Genres: Classical, electronic dance music, hip hop
- Occupations: DJ, violinist, producer, singer, songwriter
- Instruments: Viola, violin
- Years active: c. 1999–present
- Website: whoisdsharp.com IAmDSharp, YouTube.

Derryck Gleaton (born 30 August 1988), better known as DSharp, is an American violinist, DJ, singer and producer based in Atlanta, Georgia. Known for his trademark colored violins, he writes his own music and performs cover versions of popular songs, focusing on hip hop, electronic dance music and classical pieces.

DSharp has played in clubs around the world, including in Amsterdam, Dubai, London, the Philippines and Sweden, where he has performed with Smokey Robinson, American DJ Kaskade, Dutch DJs Afrojack, Chuckie, Nicky Romero and R3hab, and Swedish DJ Sebastian Ingrosso. He has played with The Dave Matthews Tribute Band, and in 2012 played on four tracks of rapper Rick Ross's album God Forgives, I Don't, produced by the J.U.S.T.I.C.E. League.

In 2009 DSharp was commissioned by the University of Alabama to write a piece for the unveiling of an African-American art collection donated to the university by Paul R. Jones. In 2015 he filmed a music video in New Zealand with grand prix horse rider Caroline Roffman.

== Background ==
Born to Don and Mae Gleaton in South Carolina, DSharp attended school in Columbus, Georgia. He began playing in sixth grade when, unable to find a trumpet for an elective course, he opted for a borrowed viola instead, and won a place with the Greater Columbus Youth String Orchestra. The family moved to Anniston, Alabama, where he was privately tutored by Bill Brazelton, who had been playing viola and violin for 65 years.

DSharp played with the Jacksonville State Community Orchestra and Etowah Youth Orchestra, traveling to Memphis, St. Louis and London with the latter. After graduating from high school in 2006, he attended the University of Alabama on a music scholarship, where he became an ambassador for the university's Creative Campus initiative. In 2010 he transferred to Georgia State University in Atlanta.

== See also ==
- List of popular music violinists
