= Harry H. Gleaton =

American politician (1906–1998)

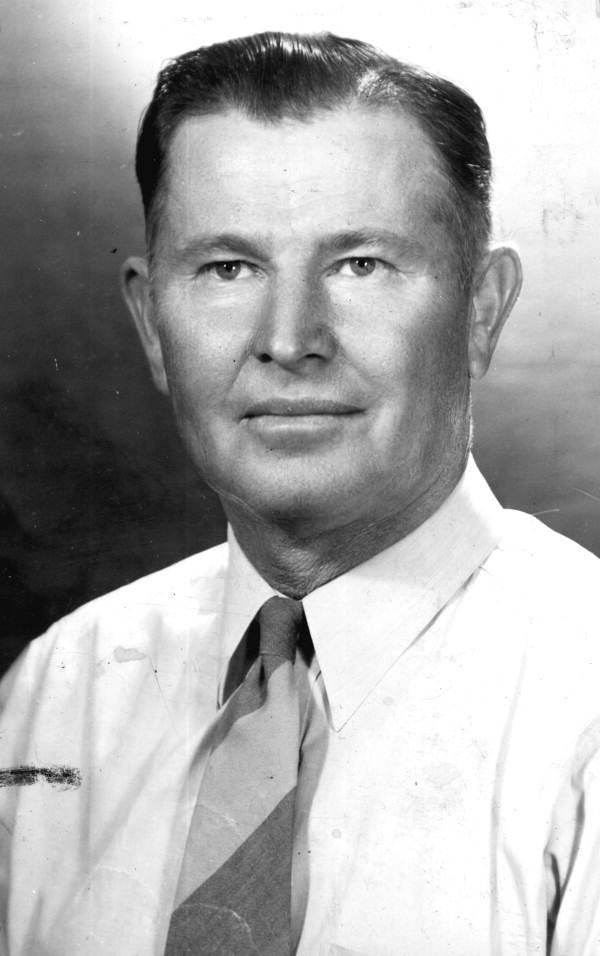
- Gleaton in 1953

Member of the Florida House of Representatives from Citrus County
- In office 1953–1956

Personal details
- Born: Harry Hilman Gleaton; April 10, 1906 White Springs, Florida, U.S.
- Died: June 4, 1998 (aged 92) Homosassa, Florida, U.S.
- Party: Democratic

Harry Hilman Gleaton (April 10, 1906 – June 4, 1998), nicknamed "The Will Rogers of the House", was an American politician. A member of the Democratic Party, he served in the Florida House of Representatives from 1953 to 1956.

== Life and career ==
Gleaton was born in White Springs, Florida, the son of Rufus Gleaton and Martha Carmichael. He worked as a land and timber agent.

Gleaton served in the Florida House of Representatives from 1953 to 1956.

== Death ==
Gleaton died on June 4, 1998, at his home in Homosassa, Florida, at the age of 92.
