= J. Wayne Reitz =

American university president (1908–1993)

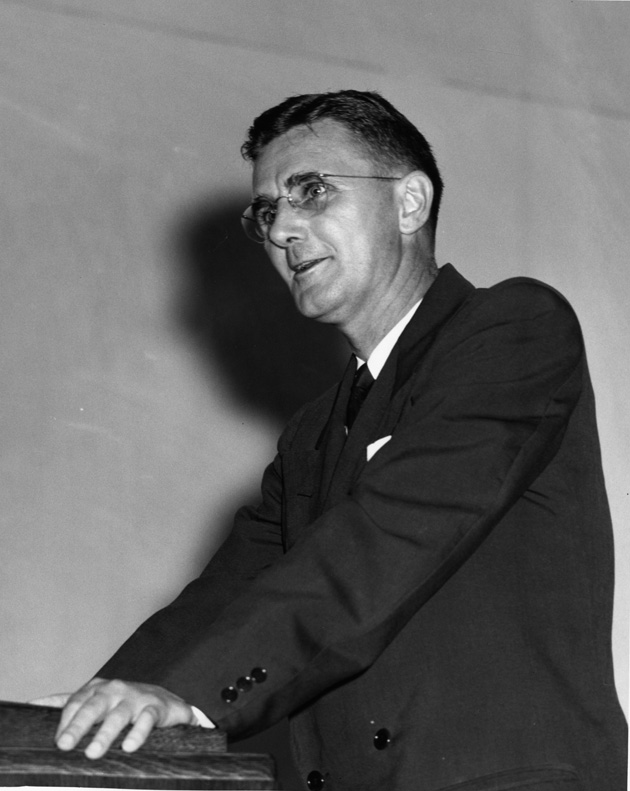
- University of Florida President; J. Wayne Reitz, circa 1955.

5th President of the University of Florida
- In office 1955–1967
- Preceded by: John S. Allen (acting)
- Succeeded by: Stephen C. O'Connell

Personal details
- Born: December 31, 1908 Olathe, Kansas, U.S.
- Died: December 24, 1993 (aged 84) Gainesville, Florida, U.S.
- Spouse: Frances Huston Millikan Reitz
- Education: B.A., Colorado State, 1930; M.S., University of Illinois, 1935; Ph.D., University of Wisconsin, 1941
- Occupation: University Professor; Agricultural Economist; University President

Julius Wayne Reitz (December 31, 1908 – December 24, 1993) was an American agricultural economist, professor and university president. Reitz was a native of Kansas, and earned bachelor's, master's and doctorate degrees in his chosen field. After working as an agricultural economist, university professor and U.S. government agricultural administrator, Reitz was selected to be the fifth president of the University of Florida, serving from 1955 until 1967.

== Early life and education ==
Wayne Reitz was born on New Year's Eve, 1908, in Olathe, Kansas. His parents later moved his family to Canon City, Colorado, where he graduated from high school in 1926, and was admitted to Colorado State University in Fort Collins, Colorado. While he was a university student, he was a member of Sigma Chi fraternity (Beta Tau chapter), the editor of the Silver Spruce yearbook, freshman class president, student body president, and the winner of the Rocky Mountain Oratory Award. Reitz received his bachelor's degree in 1930.

After graduating with a Bachelor of Science degree, Reitz started work as an agricultural extension economist, first at Colorado State, and then at the University of Illinois in Urbana-Champaign, where he earned his Master of Science degree in 1935. That same year, after accepting an assistant professorship in agricultural economics at the University of Florida in Gainesville, Florida, Reitz married Frances Huston Millikan. After being promoted to full professor, Reitz returned to his formal studies at the University of Wisconsin in Madison, Wisconsin, where he earned his Doctor of Philosophy degree in 1941.

Reitz left academic life in 1944 to work as an economic consultant for the United Growers and Shippers Association. Four years later, he became Chief of the Citrus Fruits Section in the U.S. Department of Agriculture (USDA). In 1949, President J. Hillis Miller prompted Reitz to return to the University of Florida by appointing him the university's provost for agriculture. During his time as provost, he was also appointed to the administrative boards of the Escuela Agrícola Panamericana in Tegucigalpa, Honduras, and the Instituto Interamericano de Ciencias Agrícolas de la OEA in Turrialba, Costa Rica.

== University president ==
=== Selection as president ===
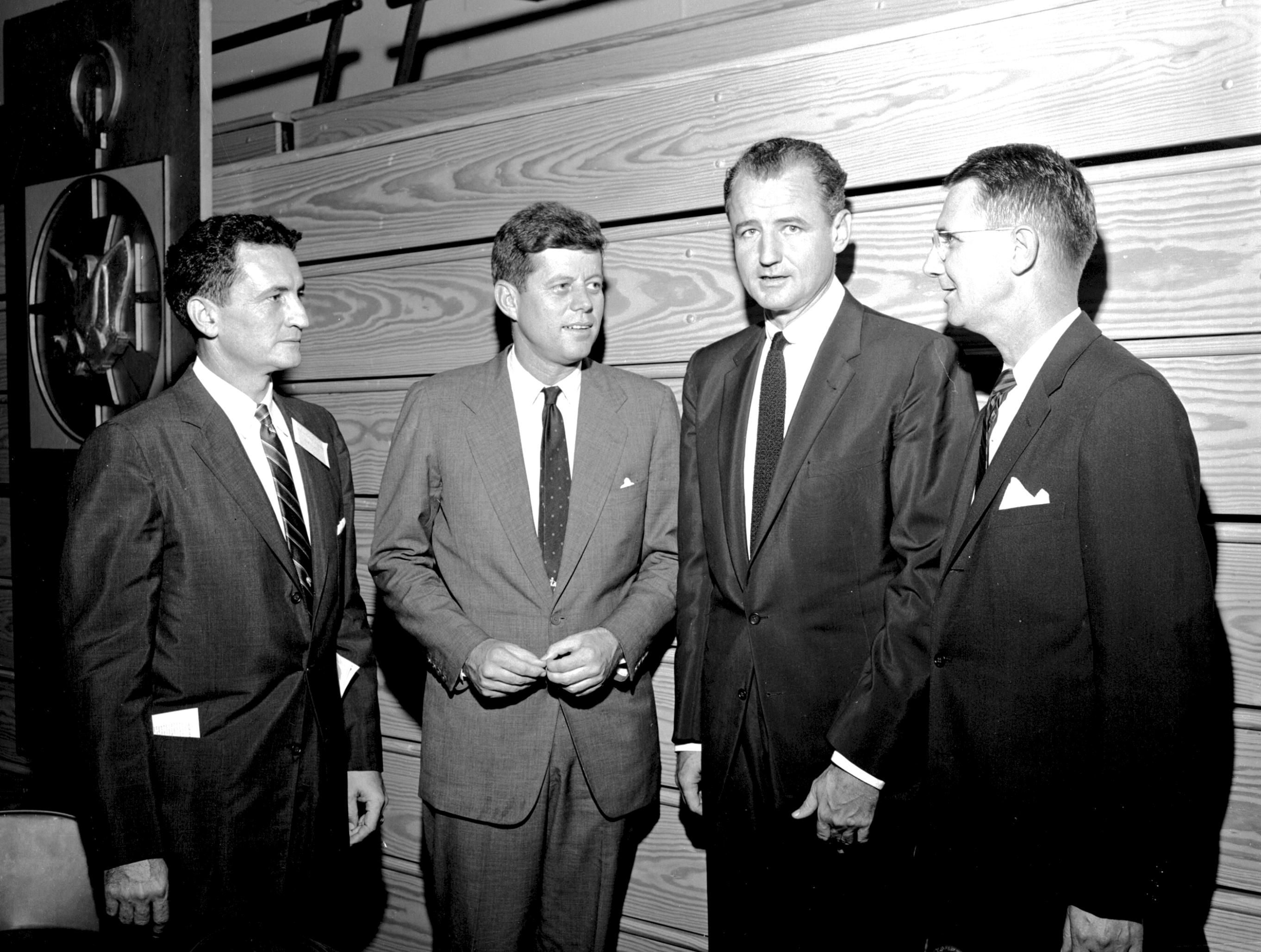
A Florida Blue Key event - with Stephen C. O'Connell, John F. Kennedy, George Smathers, and J. Wayne Reitz Florida Blue Key banquet in 1957.

University of Florida president J. Hillis Miller Sr.'s sudden and unexpected death in November 1953 started a lengthy search for his successor. In 1954, the Florida Board of Control named Philip G. Davidson, then president of the University of Louisville, as the university's new chief executive. Davidson, however, withdrew his name when controversial Acting Florida Governor Charley Johns refused to sign his payroll warrant. A new search was initiated and, two and a half months after Acting Governor Johns was replaced by the newly elected LeRoy Collins, the Board of Control settled on Reitz as its choice to be the university's fifth president on March 22, 1955. He was the first University of Florida faculty member to be elevated to the position.

=== Growth and expansion ===
During Reitz's term, more than 300 new campus buildings were erected at an approximate cost of $50 million. The buildings constructed and expanded during his term included a new health center, a nuclear training reactor, an educational television station, and a married-student housing complex. Along with the new buildings, Reitz tightened admissions standards and placed greater emphasis on academic achievement in matters ranging from the awarding of financial aid to the development of advanced placement procedures. Reitz expanded the graduate school through the addition of new programs and centers (especially the Latin American Language and Area Center) and created the Division of Sponsored Research to increase funding opportunities for research. His wife, a gracious hostess to countless dignitaries and students, also took an active role in advancing the university's music program. The facilities expansion coincided with a doubling of the student population from 9,000 to 18,000 during his tenure.

In 1960, Reitz was initiated as an honorary member of the Alpha Phi chapter of Alpha Kappa Psi.

=== Controversy, the Johns Committee, and integration ===
The Reitz years were not without controversy. Strict behavior guidelines, dress codes, and a faculty disciplinary committee to enforce these rules all received Reitz's strong endorsement. In the early 1960s, the Florida Legislative Investigation Committee, led by state senator Charley Johns, accused twenty-two university employees and several students of homosexual conduct. Those that would not resign were summarily discharged or expelled. One attempted suicide. The denial of tenure to Marshall Jones, a psychiatrist active in radical causes, led to censure by the American Association of University Professors.

Reitz has been criticized for not opposing or even welcoming Johns' investigation; Johns was a friend who at one point parked his car in Reitz's driveway, with Reitz's permission. "Reitz happily allowed Johns on campus." This differs from the reactions of the Florida State University and University of South Florida's presidents.

The campus did not witness significant integration-era disruption. The University of Florida was the first state university to integrate, and racial integration was achieved there with far less turmoil than most Southern universities and colleges. The University's relative openness to racial immigration was one reason the Johns Committee (completely opposed to integration) focused on the University of Florida; the Committee's first focus was to be the NAACP and any other outsiders who were communist or communist-leaning. (The NAACP was widely viewed as Northerners coming to the South and stirring up trouble, and integration was linked to communism, which was in turn believed to be linked with homosexuality as a threat to national security.) The first African-American student was allowed to enroll in the College of Law in September 1958. Reitz's close relationship with the student body was instrumental in curbing attempts to resist the court order to integrate.

Reitz, however, had more trouble with state governors. He opposed LeRoy Collins' 1957 attempt to create a chancellor system, and he had to fend off attempts by subsequent governors to assume control of the university's day-to-day operations. A 1965 showdown with Governor Haydon Burns over budgetary matters almost ended in Reitz's resignation. After a year of relative calm, Reitz announced he would resign in January 1967, citing "presidential fatigue," but remained in office until Florida Supreme Court Justice Stephen C. O'Connell was sworn in as the university's new president.

== Post-presidency ==
After resigning as university president, Reitz served as the director of graduate programs in the U.S. Office of Education, and eventually returned to his international activities. In addition to his Latin American work, Reitz was named to the Rockefeller Foundation's Board of Agricultural Consultants and, in 1964, he accepted an appointment to the Public Advisory Committee for Trade Negotiations. These responsibilities carried him to several nations as a teacher and adviser. His most extensive overseas assignment was to Mahidol University in Bangkok, Thailand, where he served as a consultant to the university rector.

Reitz was said to have led one of the largest expansions of the campus physical plant and the new J. Wayne Reitz Union was renamed for Reitz after his retirement in 1967. In retirement, Reitz became an important fundraiser for local charities as well as the University of Florida. He continued to work for the University of Florida Foundation's development office until his death on Christmas Eve 1993. Four years after his death, in 1997, the university established the merit-based Reitz Scholars Program to recognize and encourage academic achievement, leadership and service among its undergraduate students.

== See also ==
- Florida Gators
- History of Florida
- History of the University of Florida
- Land-grant university
- List of Colorado State University alumni
- List of Sigma Chi members
- List of University of Florida faculty and administrators
- List of University of Florida honorary degree recipients
- List of University of Florida presidents
- List of University of Illinois alumni
- List of University of Wisconsin alumni
- State University System of Florida
