= Jerald Daemyon =

American electric violinist

Jerald Daemyon is an American electric violinist born in Detroit, Michigan. He released one album, Thinking About You, which was positively received by critics.
