= Gator Growl =

Pep rally at the University of Florida

- The logo for Gator Growl 2012
- Predecessor: Dad's Day
- Formation: 1923; 103 years ago
- Type: Pep rally
- Headquarters: Gainesville, Florida
- Location: United States
- Producer: Blake McCoy
- General Chairman: Taylor Fishman
- Parent organization: Florida Blue Key
- Affiliations: University of Florida
- Website: Official website

Gator Growl is a student-run pep rally at the University of Florida, founded in 1924. It is produced by Florida Blue Key with artists funded by Student Government Productions, and marks the culmination of Homecoming Week at the university.

Since 2021, the show has been held annually at the Stephen C. O'Connell Center at the University of Florida. Until 2013, it was held at Ben Hill Griffin Stadium, the on-campus football stadium. From 2014 to 2019, the rally was held on Flavet Field. There was no show held in 2020 due to the COVID-19 pandemic.

Gator Growl is credited with inspiring Orange Peel, a similar event held annually at Oklahoma State University, after a group of students, faculty and alumni traveled to Gainesville in 1995 to witness the event.

== History ==
Gator Growl has been a University of Florida tradition for almost 100 years. Gator Growl has its roots in the tradition of "Dad's Day," a turn-of-the-century tradition in which fathers of the then all-male student body were invited to visit the new campus. In 1916, a pep rally replaced Dad's Day and "Gator Growl" was born., known as "firing up" enthusiasm for the next day's football game. In 1923, the tradition grew as skits, musical performances and guest speakers expanded the rally into a variety show. Students & alumni continued to express their Gator spirit by participating in cheers and enjoying performances by UF's Marching Band, Cheerleaders, and Dazzlers.

The Gator Growl production grew with the advancement of technology to its current scale. Today, it is a showcase of athletic talent and tradition. A combination of fireworks, light displays, live music, and comedy. More than 500 student volunteers work for thousands of hours to coordinate the night of festivities for the University of Florida community. Producers, directors, assistant directors, and staff members are in charge of the production, execution, promotion, and dismantling of the show.

The majority of the manual labor associated with this major production, however, is provided by University of Florida students who work at the Stephen C. O'Connell Center, the University of Florida's indoor sports arena. The event takes more than a week to physically set up and requires more than 200 student employees to do so. Because Gator Growl is always held the night before a home football game, these students must work all night to remove every trace of the event by the following morning. Like all aspects of Gator Growl, the physical construction is also student-run with primary responsibility falling on the Production Lead—the student technician charged with coordinating and supervising all of the other student employees. The Production Lead and the Head Electrician (also a student) will typically serve as an apprentice to the position the year prior.

As a longstanding tradition at the University of Florida, the event was moved from the Ben Hill Griffin Stadium to Flavet Field in 2014. The venue change also reduces the need for an extensive single-stage setup, thus making the event tremendously more cost-effective.

In its long history, Gator Growl has been recognized by Good Morning America, Comedy Central, Entertainment Tonight and was even featured as an answer on Jeopardy!.

== Content ==
The main purpose of the pep rally is to motivate the Florida Gators to victory in their Homecoming football game. The show features performances from the UF Dazzlers, the University of Florida cheerleaders, and The Pride of the Sunshine marching band.

In addition to the cheers, there are performances from guest comedians, musicians, and entertainers who perform for the assembled students and alumni.

A special portion of the show is reserved for celebrity cameo appearances. In the past, cameo appearances have included celebrities such as David Letterman, Katie Couric, "Nature Boy" Ric Flair, Jonah Hill, and B.o.B.

== List of comedians and performers ==
Year	Comedian(s) and Performers
1977	Gabe Kaplan
1978	Helen Reddy
1979	Bob Hope
1980	George Burns
1981	Rodney Dangerfield
1982	Robin Williams
1983	Bob Hope, Irene Cara
1984	Bill Cosby, Herbie Hancock
1985	The Smothers Brothers
1986	Billy Crystal
1987	Jay Leno
1988	Steven Wright, Jerry Seinfeld
1989	Richard Jeni, Paula Poundstone
1990	Paul Provenza, Jeff Foxworthy
1991	Brian Regan, Tom Parks
1992	David Alan Grier, Larry Miller
1993	Garry Shandling, Dennis Miller
1994	Sinbad, Bobby Slayton
1995	Kevin Pollak, Anthony Clark
1996	Paul Rodriguez, Craig Shoemaker
1997	Howie Mandel, Jeremy Hotz, Michael Buffer, Sister Hazel
1998	Ray Romano, Dave Chappelle, Carlos Mencia, Larry the Cable Guy
1999	Pablo Francisco, Carrot Top, Craig Shoemaker
2000	Mitch Hedberg, John Pinette, D. L. Hughley
2001	Daniel Tosh, Dave Attell, Jim Breuer
2002	Bill Cosby, Harland Williams
2003	Sugar Ray, Christopher Titus, Arnez J
2004	Bill Engvall, Dane Cook
2005	Greg Giraldo, Wayne Brady
2006	Jim Gaffigan, Gabriel Iglesias
2007	Frank Caliendo, Lynyrd Skynyrd
2008	Jon Reep, Steve Miller Band
2009	Dana Carvey, O.A.R., JabbaWockeeZ
2010	Aziz Ansari, Kevin Hart, Dan Levy
2011	Joel McHale, Goo Goo Dolls
2012	Tracy Morgan, Josh Turner, Dara Torres
2013	The Fray, Sister Hazel, New Directions Veterans Choir
2014	Brooks Wheelan, Foster the People, Ludacris
2015	Jana Kramer, Echosmith, T.I.
2016	Passion Pit, Timeflies, Maddie and Tae, Waka Flocka Flame
2017	Snoop Dogg, Daya
2018	Walk the Moon, Ty Dolla $ign
2019	Chase Rice, Lanco, Blanco Brown
2021	Titus O'Neil, Gunna, Neon Trees
2022	Flo Rida, Fletcher, Danny Wuerffel
2023	Jason Derulo, Sammy Adams, Tommy Townsend
2024	Dustin Lynch
2025	Steve Aoki
2026	Nikki Glaser
