= Gerald Ford judicial appointment controversies =

Gerald Ford: Judicial Nominees (1976, USA)

During President Gerald Ford's presidency, he nominated two people for two different federal appellate judgeships who were not processed by the Democratic-controlled Senate Judiciary Committee before Ford's presidency ended. Neither of the two nominees was renominated by Ford's successor, President Jimmy Carter. Both nominees were nominated after July 1, 1976, the traditional start date of the unofficial Thurmond Rule during a presidential election year. Both seats eventually were filled by appointees of President Jimmy Carter.

The two nominees were blocked in committee, and no committee hearings were ever held for either one.

== List of failed nominees ==
- United States Court of Appeals for the Sixth Circuit
  - Tennessee seat – Harry W. Wellford (judgeship later filled by Carter nominee Gilbert S. Merritt Jr.) (In 1982, Wellford was nominated by President Ronald Reagan to a different seat on the Sixth Circuit; he was quickly confirmed by the United States Senate)
- United States Court of Appeals for the Ninth Circuit
  - Arizona seat – Richard Bilby (judgeship later filled by Carter nominee Thomas Tang) (In 1979, Bilby was appointed by President Jimmy Carter to a seat on the United States District Court for the District of Arizona and confirmed three months later.)

According to an October 12, 1976 memo to President Ford from his personnel director, Douglas Bennett, eight U.S. district court nominees also were nominated during 1976 but never acted upon by the U.S. Senate:

- Ed Bethune (nominated June 15, 1976; judgeship later filled by Carter nominee Elsijane Trimble Roy)
- Donald G. Brotzman (nominated July 22, 1976; judgeship later filled by Carter nominee John L. Kane Jr.)
- Elizabeth A. Kovachevich (nominated June 8, 1976; judgeship later filled by Carter nominee Howell W. Melton; later nominated by President Reagan to a seat on the United States District Court for the Middle District of Florida and confirmed by the U.S. Senate)
- John H. Moore II (nominated August 4, 1976; judgeship later filled by Carter nominee William Hoeveler; later nominated by President Reagan to a seat on the United States District Court for the Middle District of Florida and confirmed by the U.S. Senate)
- Richard Revell (nominated April 26, 1976; judgeship later filled by Carter nominee Edward Huggins Johnstone)
- Donald Ellsworth Walter (nominated August 5, 1976; judgeship later filled by Carter nominee Earl Ernest Veron; later nominated by President Reagan to a seat on the United States District Court for the Western District of Louisiana and confirmed by the U.S. Senate)
- Herbert F. DeSimone (nominated August 5, 1976; judgeship later filled by Carter nominee Francis J. Boyle)
- James A. Andersen (nominated August 6, 1976; judgeship later filled by Carter nominee Jack Edward Tanner)

== See also ==
- Gerald Ford Supreme Court candidates
- United States federal judge
- Judicial appointment history for United States federal courts
- Deaths of United States federal judges in active service
