= Mizelle =

Mizelle is a surname. Notable people with the surname include:

- Chad Mizelle, American lawyer
- Dary John Mizelle (born 1940), American composer
- Kathryn Kimball Mizelle (born 1987), American lawyer
