= Jordan Pratt =

American judge (born 1987)

Jordan Emery Pratt
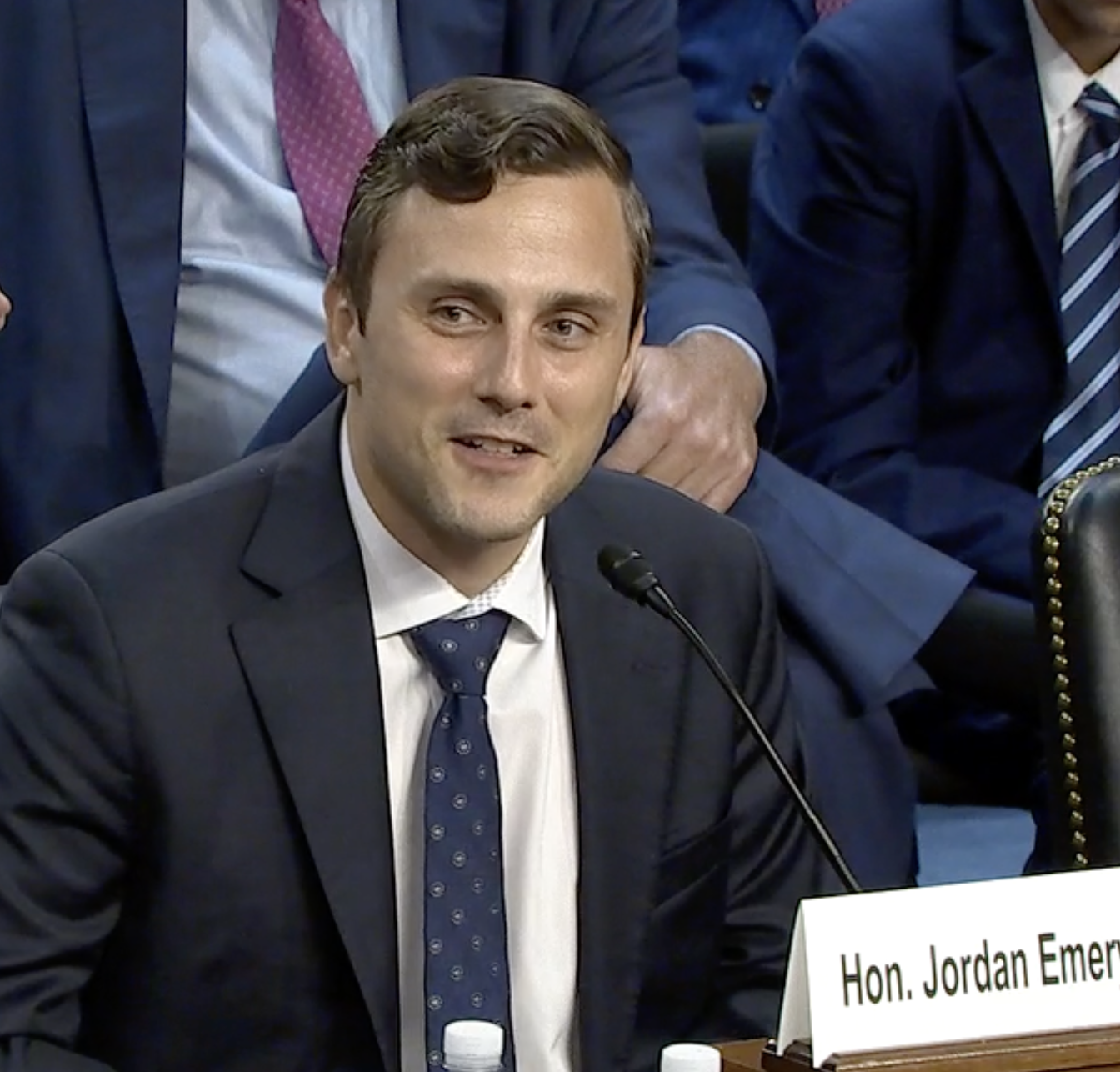

Judge of the United States District Court for the Middle District of Florida
- Incumbent
- Assumed office November 3, 2025
- Appointed by: Donald Trump
- Preceded by: Steven Douglas Merryday

Judge of the Florida Fifth District Court of Appeal
- In office 2023 – November 3, 2025

Personal details
- Born: 1987 (age 38–39) Tampa, Florida, U.S.
- Education: University of Florida (BA, JD)

Jordan Emery Pratt (born 1987) is an American lawyer who has served as a United States district judge of the United States District Court for the Middle District of Florida since 2025. He served as a judge of the Florida Fifth District Court of Appeal from 2023 to 2025. He has served as deputy general counsel of the United States Small Business Administration, senior counsel in the Office of Legal Policy of the United States Justice Department and deputy solicitor general in the Florida Attorney General's Office.

== Education ==
Pratt was born in 1987 in Tampa, Florida. He graduated from Jesuit High School in 2006 in Tampa. He graduated as a co-valedictorian of his undergraduate class at the University of Florida, receiving a Bachelor of Arts degree in criminology in 2009. He received his Juris Doctor, magna cum laude and Order of the Coif, from the University of Florida Levin College of Law in 2012, where he was a law review editor and president of the school's Federalist Society and Christian Legal Society chapters. During his second summer in law school (2011), he interned for Judge Jeffrey Sutton on the United States Court of Appeals for the Sixth Circuit.

== Career ==
After graduating from law school, Pratt was a law clerk for Judge Harvey Schlesinger of the United States District Court for the Middle District of Florida from 2012 to 2014 and Judge Jennifer Walker Elrod of the United States Court of Appeals for the Fifth Circuit from 2014 to 2015. He served as deputy solicitor general in the Florida Attorney General's Office from 2015 to 2019. Pratt then served as deputy general counsel of the United States Small Business Administration from 2019 to 2020 and senior counsel in the Office of Legal Policy of the United States Justice Department between 2020 and 2021. From 2021 to 2023, he was senior counsel at First Liberty Institute. From 2023 to 2025, he served as a judge of the Florida Fifth District Court of Appeal.

=== Federal judicial service ===
On May 28, 2025, President Donald Trump announced his intention to nominate Pratt to the United States District Court for the Middle District of Florida. On June 16, 2025, Pratt's nomination was sent to the Senate. President Trump nominated Pratt to the seat to be vacated by Judge Steven Douglas Merryday, who subsequently assumed senior status on August 31, 2025. On July 21, 2025, his nomination was reported out of committee by a 12–10 party-line vote. On October 28, 2025, the United States Senate invoked cloture on his nomination by a 52–47 vote. Later that same day, his nomination was confirmed by a 52–47 vote. He received his judicial commission on November 3, 2025.

Legal offices
Preceded by Steven Douglas Merryday	Judge of the United States District Court for the Middle District of Florida; 2025–present	Incumbent
