= Judge Berger =

Judge Berger may refer to:

- Irene Berger (born 1954), judge of the United States District Court for the Southern District of West Virginia
- Wendy Berger (born 1968), judge of the United States District Court for the Middle District of Florida

== See also ==
- Thomas R. Berger (1933–2021), justice of the Supreme Court of British Columbia
- Warren E. Burger (1907–1995), chief justice of the United States
