= Playboy Enterprises, Inc. v. Frena =

Legal issue

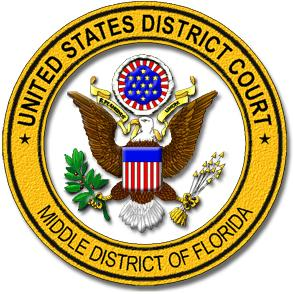
- Court: United States District Court for the Middle District of Florida
- Full case name: Playboy Enterprises, Inc. v. Frena
- Decided: December 9, 1993
- Citation: 839 F.Supp. 1552

Holding
- Copying images from a magazine and placing them online is a violation of copyright law and trademark law.

Case opinions
- Majority: Harvey E. Schlesinger

Laws applied
- Copyright Act of 1976, Lanham Act

Playboy Enterprises, Inc. v. Frena, 839 F.Supp. 1552 (1993) was a copyright infringement case decided by the United States District Court for the Middle District of Florida, holding that the unauthorized online distribution of copied photographs was copyright infringement; and that removing a magazine's trademark from copied images was trademark infringement.

== Facts ==
Defendant George Frena operated an early subscription-based online bulletin board service called Techs Warehouse BBS. Photographs copyrighted by plaintiff Playboy Entertainment, Inc. ("PEI") were scanned from paper copies of Playboy magazine by Frena and uploaded onto Techs Warehouse BBS without permission. Subscribers to the BBS were allowed to view and download high-quality computerized versions of the images and store the files on their home computers. Frena provided 170 images in this fashion.

Frena claimed to have never uploaded any of PEI's photographs onto the BBS and that his subscribers uploaded the photographs themselves. Frena stated that as soon as he was served with a summons and made aware of the matter, he removed the photographs and monitored the BBS to prevent additional PEI-owned photographs from being uploaded.

== Opinion of the court ==
PEI alleged that Frena was liable for copyright infringement when the subscribers to his BBS downloaded and distributed unauthorized copies of PEI's copyrighted photographs. PEI also alleged that Frena had removed logos including "Playboy" and "Playmate" from the photos that had been copied from Playboy magazine, which constituted trademark infringement.

The Court held that PEI owned the copyrights to the photographs in question, because they were originally published in Playboy magazine, for which PEI was the undisputed copyright owner. PEI's possession of the necessary copyright certificate constituted prima facie evidence in favor of the company. Also, because the subscribers to the BBS made unauthorized copies of the images via downloading and distributed them elsewhere on the Internet, Frena was found liable for contributory infringement because he produced the original scanned copies himself.

In another copyright-related argument, PEI claimed that Frena had infringed on its display rights, which under copyright law, allow the owner to authorize where and how copyrighted works are displayed, and PEI had not authorized display of the images at Frena's BBS service. This argument was also found convincing by the court.

Further, the court found that by removing the Playboy-oriented logos from the scanned images and replacing them with information about his BBS service, Frena had committed trademark infringement under the Lanham Act, because this act was likely to cause confusion among users as to the true origin of the images.

== Impact ==
Playboy Enterprises, Inc. v. Frena has been frequently cited as an important early precedent in the emerging law of copyright on the Internet, particularly given the technological ease with which unauthorized copies of images can be reproduced and distributed online. The ruling is also often cited as an influence on the passage of the Digital Millennium Copyright Act five years later, as that law attempted to enact penalties for web-based services that contribute to copyright infringement committed by their users. The ruling is also sometimes cited as an early precedent for online trademark infringement disputes.
