= Judge Mendoza =

Judge Mendoza may refer to:

- Carlos E. Mendoza (born 1970), judge of the Florida Circuit Court and of the United States District Court for the Middle District of Florida
- Salvador Mendoza Jr. (born 1971), judge of the superior court for Benton and Franklin counties, Washington, and of the United States Court of Appeals for the Ninth Circuit
