= John Badalamenti =

American federal judge (born 1973)

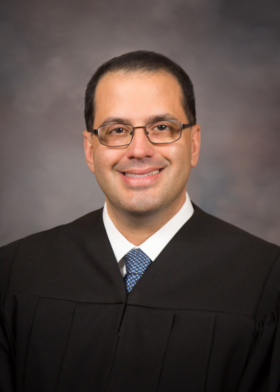

Judge of the United States District Court for the Middle District of Florida
- Incumbent
- Assumed office April 20, 2020
- Appointed by: Donald Trump
- Preceded by: Elizabeth A. Kovachevich

Judge of the Florida Second District Court of Appeal
- In office April 29, 2015 – June 4, 2020
- Appointed by: Rick Scott
- Preceded by: Charles A. Davis
- Succeeded by: Suzanne Labrit

Personal details
- Born: John Leonard Badalamenti; August 22, 1973 (age 52) Brooklyn, New York, U.S.
- Education: University of Florida (BA, MA, JD)

John Leonard Badalamenti (born 1973) is an American lawyer and jurist serving as a United States district judge of the United States District Court for the Middle District of Florida. He was appointed in 2020 by President Donald Trump. He previously served as a judge on the Florida Second District Court of Appeal from 2015 to 2020.

== Biography ==
Badalamenti received a Bachelor of Arts in 1995, with highest honors, a Master of Arts in 1999, and a Juris Doctor in 1999, with honors, from the University of Florida. Badalamenti was an initiated member of the Epsilon Zeta chapter of Sigma Nu fraternity during his tenure as an undergraduate student. He began his career in the U.S. Attorney General's Honors Program, serving as an attorney-advisor at the Federal Bureau of Prisons from 1999 to 2000. He first clerked for Judge Frank M. Hull of the United States Court of Appeals for the Eleventh Circuit from 2000 to 2001. Badalamenti was also an associate at Carlton Fields from 2001 to 2002. Then, he clerked for Judge Paul Hitch Roney of the United States Court of Appeals for the Eleventh Circuit from 2003 to 2006. He served for nearly a decade as an Assistant Federal Public Defender in the Middle District of Florida from 2006 to 2015. He is an Eagle Scout and serves as a volunteer for the Boy Scouts of America.

Badalamenti was counsel of record, authored the petition for writ of certiorari, and presented oral argument in the Supreme Court of the United States for the prevailing petitioner, a fisherman, who was charged under a criminal provision, 18 U.S.C. § 1519, of the Sarbanes-Oxley Act of 2002 for destroying undersized fish to prevent their seizure by federal authorities.Yates v. United States (2015), 135 S. Ct. 1074 (2015).

As a child, Badalamenti lived in the Gravesend Neighborhood of Brooklyn, New York, attending Our Lady of Grace Catholic Academy.

Badalamenti was diagnosed with keratoconus in law school in the 1990s and regained his sight through cornea transplants. He was later blinded in one eye after suffering an eye infection in the fall of 2020.

He is a member of the conservative Federalist Society. Since 2022, he has served on the board of directors for Gentlemen's Quest Inc., a Tampa-based not-for-profit organization whose mission is to guide and mentor at-risk youth to make positive choices regarding their academics and behavior, and to equip them with the skills necessary to become productive citizens and leaders in the community.

While teaching a seminar on originalism as an adjunct at University of Florida School of Law in the fall of 2024, Badalamenti gave an award to a student paper arguing that the Constitution of the United States favors white people, an award which is "automatically given to the student with the highest score" and that "sounds more prestigious than it is." In spring of 2025, the author of that paper, Preston Damksy, publicly called for Jewish people to be "abolished by any means necessary."

== Judicial service ==
=== State judicial service ===
From 2015 to 2020, Badalamenti served as a Judge of the Florida Second District Court of Appeal after being appointed by Governor Rick Scott. He won merit retention in 2016. His state court service ended when he was commissioned as a federal judge.

=== Federal judicial service ===
In December 2017, Badalamenti was chosen by the bipartisan Federal Judicial Nominating Commission Middle District Conference as one of four finalists for Senators Bill Nelson and Marco Rubio to recommend to President Trump to fill one of the vacancies created by Judges James D. Whittemore and John E. Steele taking senior status. Badalamenti was not nominated for either vacancy.

On December 23, 2019, President Donald Trump announced his intent to nominate Badalamenti to serve as a United States District Judge of the United States District Court for the Middle District of Florida. On February 4, 2020, his nomination was sent to the United States Senate. President Trump nominated Badalamenti to the seat vacated by Judge Elizabeth A. Kovachevich, who assumed senior status on December 14, 2018. A substantial majority of the American Bar Association (ABA)'s Standing Committee on the Federal Judiciary, which rates the qualifications of federal judicial nominees, rated Badalamenti "well qualified" to serve as a federal trial court judge. A hearing on his nomination before the Senate Judiciary Committee was held on February 12, 2020. On March 12, 2020, his nomination was reported out of committee by a 15–6 vote. On May 21, 2020, the Senate invoked cloture on his nomination by a 65–28 vote. On June 1, 2020, his nomination was confirmed by a 55–22 vote. He received his judicial commission on June 4, 2020.

=== Notable cases ===
In 2023, Badalamenti entered summary judgment against a plaintiff who sued the School Board of Lee County based on termination of a food supply contract with his business. The plaintiff alleged that the termination of the contract violated his First Amendment rights because it was precipitated by a Facebook post he wrote, in which he characterized the COVID-19 pandemic as a “hoax” and denounced George Floyd. Badalamenti ruled that the School Board's stated interests in terminating the contract outweighed the plaintiff's First Amendment interests.

Legal offices
Preceded by Charles A. Davis	Judge of the Florida Second District Court of Appeal; 2015–2020	Succeeded by Suzanne Labrit
Preceded by Elizabeth A. Kovachevich	Judge of the United States District Court for the Middle District of Florida; 2020–present	Incumbent
