= Anne-Leigh Gaylord Moe =

American judge (born 1979)

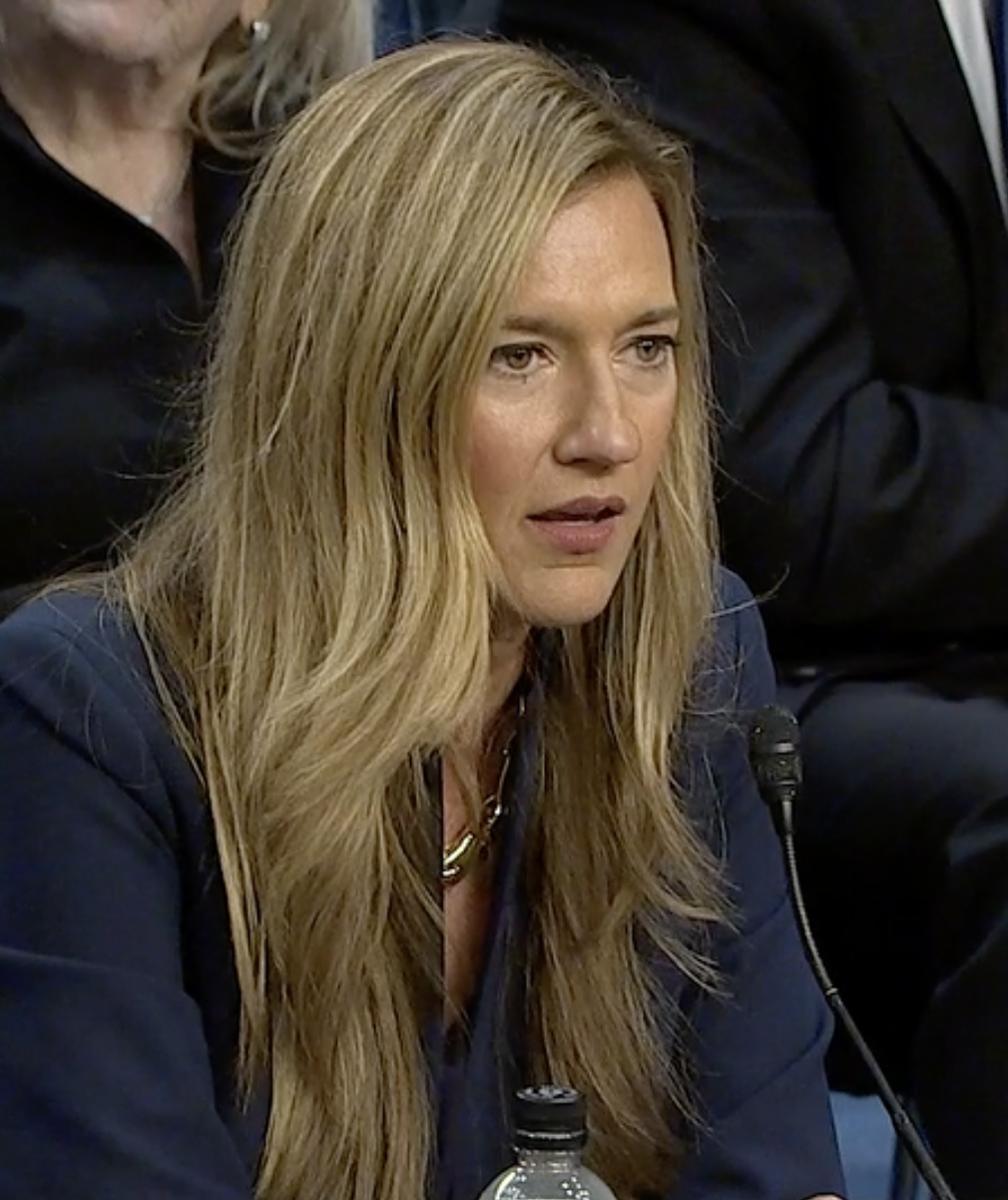

Judge of the United States District Court for the Middle District of Florida
- Incumbent
- Assumed office October 24, 2025
- Appointed by: Donald Trump
- Preceded by: Brian J. Davis

Judge of the Florida Second District Court of Appeal
- In office 2025
- Appointed by: Ron DeSantis

Judge of the Florida 13th Circuit Court
- In office March 2017 – 2025
- Appointed by: Rick Scott

Personal details
- Born: Anne Leigh Gaylord; 1979 (age 46–47) Miami, Florida, U.S.
- Education: Furman University (BA); Arizona State University (JD)

Anne-Leigh Gaylord Moe (née Gaylord; born 1979) is an American lawyer who has served as a United States district judge of the United States District Court for the Middle District of Florida since 2025. She served as a judge of the Florida Second District Court of Appeal in 2025 and as a judge of the Florida 13th Circuit Court from 2017 to 2025.

== Early life and education ==
Moe was born Anne Leigh Gaylord in 1979 in Miami, Florida. She received a Bachelor of Arts degree in 2001 from Furman University and a Juris Doctor in 2005 from the Sandra Day O'Connor College of Law at Arizona State University. While attending law school, she served as an intern for Justice Kenneth B. Bell of the Supreme Court of Florida and Judge Jeffrey Hotham of the Arizona Superior Court in Maricopa County, Arizona.

== Career ==
Moe began her career as a law clerk for Judge Virginia M. Hernandez Covington of the United States District Court for the Middle District of Florida. Moe was formerly a shareholder at the law firm of Bush Ross in Tampa. In December 2024, Moe was appointed judge of the Florida Second District Court of Appeal. She previously served as a judge of the Florida 13th Circuit Court in Hillsborough County from March 2017 to 2025.

=== Federal judicial service ===
On May 28, 2025, President Donald Trump announced his intention to nominate Moe to the United States District Court for the Middle District of Florida. On June 16, 2025, Moe's nomination was sent to the Senate. Moe would fill the seat to be vacated by Judge Brian J. Davis, who assumed senior status on December 30, 2023. The Senate Judiciary Committee held a hearing on her nomination on June 25, 2025, and her nomination was reported to the floor of the United States Senate on July 17, 2025. On October 21, cloture was invoked on her nomination by a vote of 53–46. Later that day, her nomination was confirmed by a 53–46 vote. She received her judicial commission on October 24, 2025.

Legal offices
Preceded by Brian J. Davis	Judge of the United States District Court for the Middle District of Florida; 2025–present	Incumbent
