= Charlene Edwards Honeywell =

American judge (born 1957)

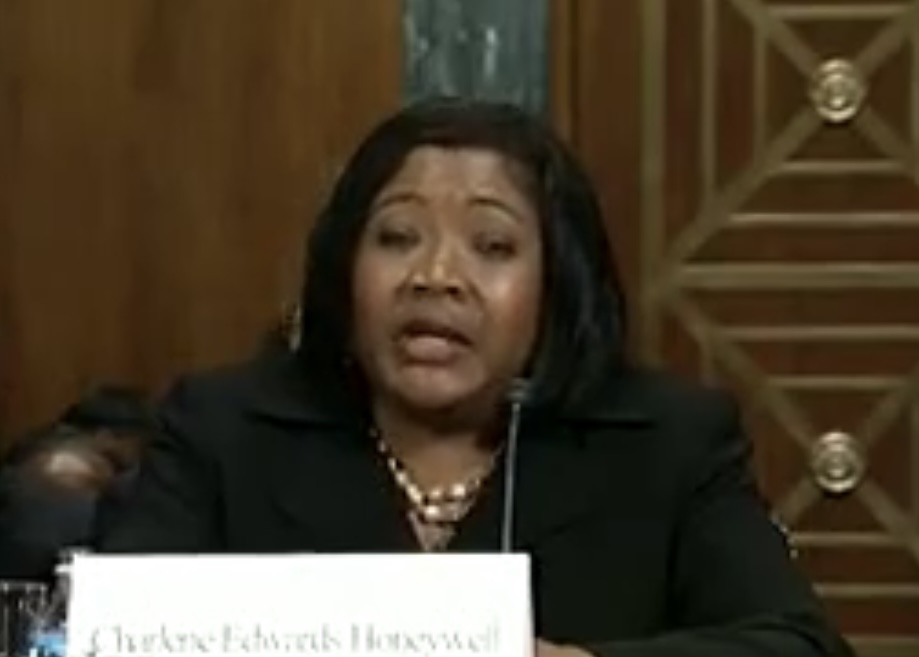

Senior Judge of the United States District Court for the Middle District of Florida
- Incumbent
- Assumed office December 4, 2023

Judge of the United States District Court for the Middle District of Florida
- In office November 12, 2009 – December 4, 2023
- Appointed by: Barack Obama
- Preceded by: Susan C. Bucklew
- Succeeded by: Kyle Dudek

Personal details
- Born: Charlene Vanessa Edwards; 1957 (age 68–69) Deerfield Beach, Florida, U.S.
- Education: Howard University (BA); University of Florida (JD)

Charlene Vanessa Edwards Honeywell (born 1957) is a senior United States district judge of the United States District Court for the Middle District of Florida.

== Early life and education ==
Born in Deerfield Beach, Florida, Honeywell graduated from Pompano Beach High School in 1975. She then graduated from Howard University in 1979 with a Bachelor of Arts degree in political science. Honeywell earned a Juris Doctor in December 1981 from the Fredric G. Levin College of Law at the University of Florida.

== Career ==
From 1982 until 1985, Honeywell served in the Tallahassee Public Defender's office, and then spent two years as an assistant public defender in the Tampa public defender's office. From November 1987 until June 1994, Honeywell served as an assistant city attorney for the City of Tampa and then spent six years at the Tampa law firm of Hill, Ward & Henderson, where she was a senior associate from 1995 until 1997 and then a partner from 1997 until December 2000.

=== State judicial service ===
In 1994, Florida Governor Lawton Chiles appointed Honeywell to be judge in Hillsborough County Circuit Court. She served from July 1, 1994 until December 31, 1994, but narrowly lost a bid for reelection in the fall of 1994 to attorney Frank Gomez.

In 1999, Honeywell applied for an opening on the Florida Circuit Courts, inspired in part by the appointment of Peggy Quince as the first African American female justice on the Florida Supreme Court. In 2000, Florida Governor Jeb Bush appointed Honeywell to a judicial post on the Thirteenth Circuit in Hillsborough County, which she held from January 2001 until becoming a federal judge in 2009.

=== Federal judicial service ===
On June 25, 2009, President Barack Obama nominated Honeywell to fill the seat vacated by Susan C. Bucklew on the United States District Court for the Middle District of Florida. The United States Senate confirmed Honeywell's nomination by an 88–0 vote on November 9, 2009. Honeywell received her commission on November 12, 2009. She assumed senior status on December 4, 2023.

== See also ==
- List of African American federal judges
- List of African-American jurists

Legal offices
Preceded by Susan C. Bucklew	Judge of the United States District Court for the Middle District of Florida; 2009–2023	Succeeded by Kyle Dudek
