= Gregory A. Presnell =

American judge (born 1942)

Gregory Presnell

Senior judge of the United States District Court for the Middle District of Florida
- Incumbent
- Assumed office April 1, 2012

Judge of the United States District Court for the Middle District of Florida
- In office July 31, 2000 – April 1, 2012
- Appointed by: Bill Clinton
- Preceded by: Seat established
- Succeeded by: Sheri Polster Chappell

Personal details
- Born: November 20, 1942 (age 83) Tampa, Florida, U.S.
- Education: College of William & Mary (BA); University of Florida (JD)

Gregory Anson Presnell (born November 20, 1942) is a senior United States district judge of the United States District Court for the Middle District of Florida.

== Education and career ==
Presnell received his Bachelor of Arts degree in economics from the College of William & Mary in 1964. He received his Juris Doctor from the Fredric G. Levin College of Law at the University of Florida in 1966. He was in private practice in Orlando, Florida from 1966 until 2000, serving also for part of that time in the United States Army Reserve from 1967 to 1973.

=== Federal judicial service ===
On June 8, 2000, he was nominated by president Bill Clinton to a new seat on the United States District Court for the Middle District of Florida established by 113 Stat. 1501. He was confirmed by the Senate on July 21, 2000, and received his commission on July 31, 2000. On April 1, 2012, he assumed senior status. He was succeeded by Sheri Polster Chappell.

== Notable cases ==
- In the 2006 case Avista Management, Inc. v. Waussau Underwriters Insurance Company, Presnell ordered the representatives of the two parties to compete in a game of "rock, paper, scissors" to determine which party could select the location for a pre-trial deposition, a matter he considered should have been trivially simple to come to agreement on. Presnell's comments on the crack/powder sentencing disparity were also noted by the media in that year.
- In October 2016, he dismissed the H-1B visa lawsuit that two IT workers brought against Disney for outsourcing their jobs.
- In June 2023 Presnell granted a preliminary injunction in a case challenging the constitutionality of Florida's statutory ban on drag show performances. He ruled that the statute both failed to survive strict scrutiny, which is necessary since it regulated speech on the basis of content, and that it was vague and over-broad.

Legal offices
Preceded by Seat established by 113 Stat. 1501	Judge of the United States District Court for the Middle District of Florida; 2000–2012	Succeeded by Sheri Polster Chappell
