= Elizabeth A. Kovachevich =

American judge (born 1936)

Elizabeth Anne Kovachevich

Senior Judge of the United States District Court for the Middle District of Florida
- Incumbent
- Assumed office December 14, 2018

Chief Judge of the United States District Court for the Middle District of Florida
- In office 1996–2002
- Preceded by: John H. Moore II
- Succeeded by: Patricia C. Fawsett

Judge of the United States District Court for the Middle District of Florida
- In office March 9, 1982 – December 14, 2018
- Appointed by: Ronald Reagan
- Preceded by: George C. Young
- Succeeded by: John Badalamenti

Judge for the Sixth Judicial Circuit of Florida
- In office 1973–1982

Personal details
- Born: Elizabeth Anne Kovachevich; December 14, 1936 (age 89) Canton, Illinois, U.S.
- Education: St. Petersburg College (AA); University of Miami (BBA); Stetson University (JD)

Elizabeth Anne Kovachevich (born December 14, 1936) is a senior United States district judge of the United States District Court for the Middle District of Florida.

== Education and career ==
Born in Canton, Illinois, Kovachevich earned an Associate of Arts degree from St. Petersburg Junior College (now St. Petersburg College) in 1956 and a Bachelor of Business Administration from the University of Miami in 1958. She then earned a Juris Doctor in 1961 from Stetson University College of Law. Kovachevich worked in private law practice in St. Petersburg, Florida from 1961 until 1973, when she was elected a judge of the State of Florida's Sixth Judicial Circuit. Kovachevich was the first female judge on the Sixth Judicial Circuit, and she served as a state judge in Florida until 1982.

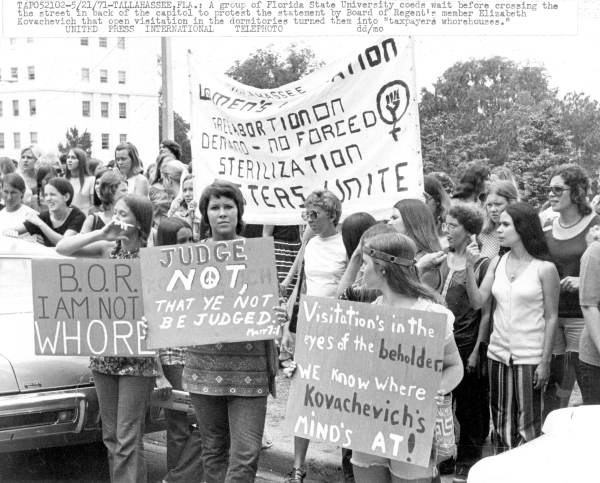
May 21, 1971 protest against Elizabeth Kovachevich

=== Controversy ===
Kovachevich was a member of the Florida Board of Regents (BOR) in 1970 when the board ended curfews for women in dormitories. The residents also wanted to change the rules to allow visitation by males, which displeased Kovachevich greatly. During a speech at the Clearwater Rotary Club in May 1971, she stated that dorms were becoming “taxpayers whorehouses.” The BOR chairman called her statement offensive, but the students at Florida State University were outraged. On May 21, 1971, hundreds of female students protested by marching to the Capitol, carrying signs mocking Kovachevich.

== Federal judicial service ==
=== Failed nomination under Ford ===
On June 8, 1976, President Gerald Ford nominated Kovachevich to a seat on a federal district court, according to an October 12, 1976 memo to Ford by his personnel director, Douglas Bennett. The United States Senate never acted on Kovachevich's nomination before Ford's presidency ended. Her nomination was blocked through a custom known as senatorial courtesy because the Democratic Party controlled the Senate, and Florida's Senators, Lawton Chiles and Richard Stone, Democrats, opposed her confirmation. Ford's successor, President Jimmy Carter, elected not to renominate Kovachevich.

=== Renomination under Reagan ===
Kovachevich was nominated by President Ronald Reagan on January 26, 1982, to a seat on the United States District Court for the Middle District of Florida vacated by Judge George C. Young. She was confirmed by the United States Senate on March 4, 1982, and received commission on March 9, 1982. She served as the chief judge from 1996 to 2002. Kovachevich is based in Tampa, Florida. She assumed senior status on December 14, 2018, her 82nd birthday.

== See also ==
- Gerald Ford judicial appointment controversies
- List of United States federal judges by longevity of service

Legal offices
Preceded by George C. Young	Judge of the United States District Court for the Middle District of Florida; 1982–2018	Succeeded by John Badalamenti
Preceded by John H. Moore II	Chief Judge of the United States District Court for the Middle District of Florida; 1996–2002	Succeeded by Patricia C. Fawsett
