= John Antoon =

American judge (born 1946)

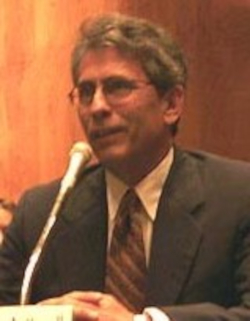

Senior Judge of the United States District Court for the Middle District of Florida
- Incumbent
- Assumed office June 3, 2013

Judge of the United States District Court for the Middle District of Florida
- In office May 31, 2000 – June 3, 2013
- Appointed by: Bill Clinton
- Preceded by: G. Kendall Sharp
- Succeeded by: Carlos E. Mendoza

Personal details
- Born: John Antoon II; 1946 (age 79–80) Bakersfield, California, U.S.
- Education: Florida Southern College (BA); Florida State University (JD); Florida Institute of Technology (MS); University of Virginia (LLM)

John Antoon II (born 1946) is a senior United States district judge of the United States District Court for the Middle District of Florida.

== Early life and education ==
Antoon was born in 1946, in Bakersfield, California. He received his Bachelor of Arts degree from Florida Southern College in 1968, his Juris Doctor from Florida State University College of Law in 1971, his Master of Science from Florida Institute of Technology in 1993, and his Master of Laws from the University of Virginia School of Law in 2001.

== Career ==
Antoon was a prosecutor for the City of Cocoa, Florida, from 1971 to 1972 and was in private practice from 1971 to 1984. He was an associate with Gleason, Walker, Pearson, and Shreve (1971) and as a partner with Shreve, Antoon, and Clifton (1972–1974), Antoon and Clifton, P.A. (1974–1976), and Stromire, Westman, Lintz, Baugh, McKinley, and Antoon, P.A. (1976–1984). He served as an assistant public defender for the Eighteenth Judicial Circuit of Florida from 1972 to 1976 and a circuit judge of the Eighteenth Circuit from 1985 to 1995. Antoon served as a judge on the Florida Fifth District Court of Appeal from 1995 to 2000.

=== Federal judicial service ===
President Bill Clinton nominated Antoon to the United States District Court for the Middle District of Florida on February 9, 2000, to the seat vacated by Judge G. Kendall Sharp. He was confirmed by the Senate on May 24, 2000, and received his commission on May 31, 2000. He assumed senior status on June 3, 2013.

Legal offices
Preceded by G. Kendall Sharp	Judge of the United States District Court for the Middle District of Florida; 2000–2013	Succeeded by Carlos E. Mendoza
