= Timothy J. Corrigan =

American judge (born 1956)

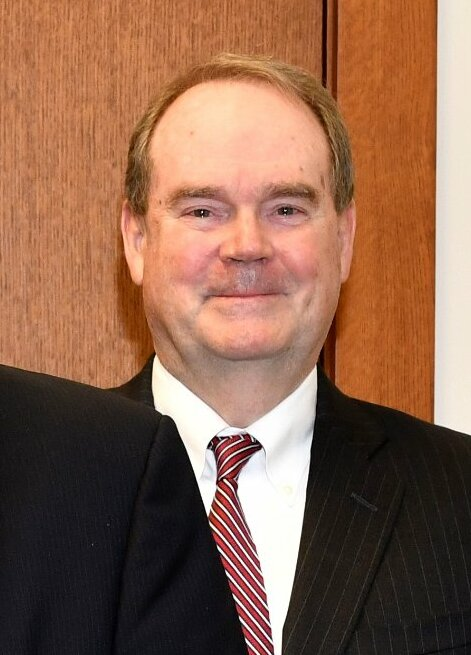
- Corrigan in 2022

Senior Judge of the United States District Court for the Middle District of Florida
- Incumbent
- Assumed office November 2, 2024

Chief Judge of the United States District Court for the Middle District of Florida
- In office November 2, 2020 – November 2, 2024
- Preceded by: Steven Douglas Merryday
- Succeeded by: Marcia Morales Howard

Judge of the United States District Court for the Middle District of Florida
- In office September 13, 2002 – November 2, 2024
- Appointed by: George W. Bush
- Preceded by: Seat established by 113 Stat. 1501
- Succeeded by: vacant seat

Magistrate Judge of the United States District Court for the Middle District of Florida
- In office 1996–2002

Personal details
- Born: February 21, 1956 (age 70) Jacksonville, Florida, U.S.
- Education: University of Notre Dame (BA); Duke University (JD)

Timothy J. Corrigan (born February 21, 1956) is a senior United States district judge of the United States District Court for the Middle District of Florida.

== Early life and education ==
Corrigan was born in 1956 in Jacksonville, Florida. He received his Bachelor of Arts degree in 1978 from the University of Notre Dame and his Juris Doctor from Duke University School of Law in 1981.

== Career ==
Corrigan served as a law clerk to Judge Gerald B. Tjoflat of the United States Court of Appeals for the Eleventh Circuit from 1981 to 1982. He was in private practice in Florida from 1982 to 1996, and served as an adjunct instructor at the Duke University School of Law from 1985 to 1996. Corrigan served as a United States magistrate judge of the United States District Court for the Middle District of Florida from 1996 to 2002, and was an adjunct professor at the Florida Coastal School of Law in 1999.

=== Federal judicial service ===
President George W. Bush nominated Corrigan to the United States District Court for the Middle District of Florida on May 22, 2002, to a new seat created by 113 Stat. 1501. He was confirmed by the Senate on September 12, 2002, he received his commission the next day. He became chief judge on November 2, 2020. He assumed senior status on November 2, 2024.

== Assassination attempt ==
In June 2013, Corrigan was the victim of an assassination attempt. A bullet fired by Aaron Richardson, a criminal defendant whom Corrigan had earlier sentenced, into Corrigan's home missed him by less than two inches, although he suffered superficial wounds from broken glass. In June 2016, Richardson was sentenced to 343 years in prison for the attempt and related charges.

== Sources ==
Legal offices
Preceded by Seat established by 113 Stat. 1501	Judge of the United States District Court for the Middle District of Florida; 2002–2024	Succeeded by Marcia Morales Howard
Preceded by Steven Douglas Merryday	Chief Judge of the United States District Court for the Middle District of Florida; 2020–2024	Vacant
