= Marcia Morales Howard =

American judge (born 1965)

Marcia Howard
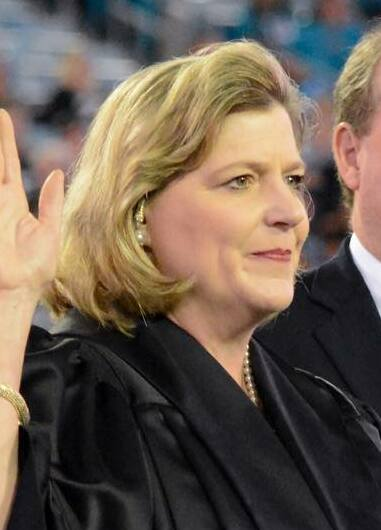
- Howard in 2020

Chief Judge of the United States District Court for the Middle District of Florida
- Incumbent
- Assumed office November 3, 2024
- Preceded by: Timothy J. Corrigan

Judge of the United States District Court for the Middle District of Florida
- Incumbent
- Assumed office February 20, 2007
- Appointed by: George W. Bush
- Preceded by: Harvey E. Schlesinger

Personal details
- Born: Marcia Maria Morales; 1965 (age 60–61) Jacksonville, Florida, U.S.
- Education: Vanderbilt University (BS); University of Florida (JD)

Marcia Morales Howard (née Morales; born 1965) is the chief United States district judge of the United States District Court for the Middle District of Florida.

== Education and career ==
Howard was born in Jacksonville, Florida. She received a Bachelor of Science degree in economics from Vanderbilt University in 1987 and her Juris Doctor with honors from the Fredric G. Levin College of Law at the University of Florida in 1990. At UF Law she was elected to the Order of the Coif and served as the Symposium Editor for the Florida Law Review. Howard was in private practice in Jacksonville from 1990 to 2003 as a civil litigator concentrating in labor and employment law, and was a member of the National Association of Railroad Trial Counsel. From 2003 to 2007, she served as a United States magistrate judge in the Middle District of Florida.

=== Federal judicial service ===
On January 9, 2007 she was nominated by President George W. Bush to serve as a judge on the United States District Court for the Middle District of Florida. Her nomination was confirmed by the United States Senate on February 15, 2007. She received her commission on February 20, 2007. She became the chief judge on November 3, 2024.

== See also ==
- List of Hispanic and Latino American jurists

Legal offices
Preceded by Harvey E. Schlesinger	Judge of the United States District Court for the Middle District of Florida; 2007–present	Incumbent
Preceded by Timothy J. Corrigan	Chief Judge of the United States District Court for the Middle District of Florida; 2024–present	Incumbent
