= Steven Douglas Merryday =

American judge (born 1950)

Senior Judge of the United States District Court for the Middle District of Florida
- Incumbent
- Assumed office August 31, 2025

Chief Judge of the United States District Court for the Middle District of Florida
- In office August 1, 2015 – November 1, 2020
- Preceded by: Anne C. Conway
- Succeeded by: Timothy J. Corrigan

Judge of the United States District Court for the Middle District of Florida
- In office February 10, 1992 – August 31, 2025
- Appointed by: George H. W. Bush
- Preceded by: Seat established by 104 Stat. 5089
- Succeeded by: Jordan Pratt

Personal details
- Born: 1950 (age 75–76) Palatka, Florida, U.S.
- Education: University of Florida (BA, JD)

Steven Douglas Merryday (born 1950) is a senior United States district judge of the United States District Court for the Middle District of Florida.

During the COVID-19 pandemic, Merryday issued rulings that blocked the CDC from enforcing its public health rules regarding cruise ship operations and blocked the Navy from removing an insubordinate commander of a $1.8 billion warship who refused to comply with COVID-19 precautions and exposed others to COVID-19 while experiencing symptoms.

== Education and career ==
Merryday was born in Palatka, Florida. He graduated with a Bachelor of Arts degree as valedictorian from the University of Florida in 1972 and with a Juris Doctor from the University of Florida College of Law in 1975. As a law student, Merryday served as student body president of the University of Florida. Merryday was in private practice in Tampa, Florida from 1975 to 1992.

== Federal judicial service ==
President George H. W. Bush nominated Merryday to the United States District Court for the Middle District of Florida on September 23, 1991, to a new seat created by 104 Stat. 5089. Confirmed by the Senate on February 6, 1992, and received his commission on February 10, 1992. He served as Chief Judge from August 1, 2015, to November 1, 2020. He assumed senior status on August 31, 2025.

=== Notable rulings ===
On June 18, 2021, he ruled against the Centers For Disease Control (CDC) rules on cruise ships safety measures; saying,"[T]he agency’s conditional sail order— (a framework of regulations dictating how cruises can restart in the U.S. during the COVID-19 pandemic)— "can remain in place for Florida cruises only until July 18", thereby granting Governor Ron DeSantis' request for a preliminary injunction while the full case moves forward.

In 2022, Merryday blocked the Navy from removing the commander of a $1.8 billion warship. The commander refused to get vaccinated, thus failing to comply with Navy policy. The refusal to get vaccinated would prevent the warship from going to port in countries with vaccine requirements. Merryday forced the Navy to retain the commander. As a consequence, the $1.8 billion warship was kept in port. The commander engaged in other forms of insubordination and deception, which included refusing to get tested for COVID while experiencing symptoms, exposing others to COVID while having symptoms, and traveling to high-risk areas without disclosing it. Navy vice admiral Daniel W. Dwyer characterized the commander as a "manifest national security concern... It is untenable that a subordinate commander may choose to disregard, modify, or half-heartedly execute a senior officer’s orders due to his or her personal beliefs... [this insubordination] degrades mission effectiveness and the ability of the strike group to perform its mission in the interest of U.S. national security."

On September 19, 2025, less than a week after Donald Trump had filed a $15 billion defamation lawsuit against The New York Times, four of its reporters, and Penguin Random House, the publisher of a book written by two of the reporters, in the Middle Florida U.S. District Court, Merryday dismissed the 85-page complaint as "improper and impermissible" under Rule 8 of the Federal Rules of Civil Procedure. He wrote that the complaint was full of material irrelevant to the allegations made, with the first of two counts of defamation appearing on page 80,' and that a complaint is neither a "public forum for vituperation and invective" nor a "megaphone for public relations or a podium for a passionate oration at a political rally or the functional equivalent of the Hyde Park Speakers' Corner". He gave Trump 28 days to file an amended complaint.

== See also ==
- List of United States federal judges by longevity of service

== Sources ==
Legal offices
Preceded by Seat established by 104 Stat. 5089	Judge of the United States District Court for the Middle District of Florida; 1992–2025	Succeeded by Jordan Pratt
Preceded by Anne C. Conway	Chief Judge of the United States District Court for the Middle District of Florida; 2015–2020	Succeeded by Timothy J. Corrigan
