= Kathryn Kimball Mizelle =

American judge (born 1987)

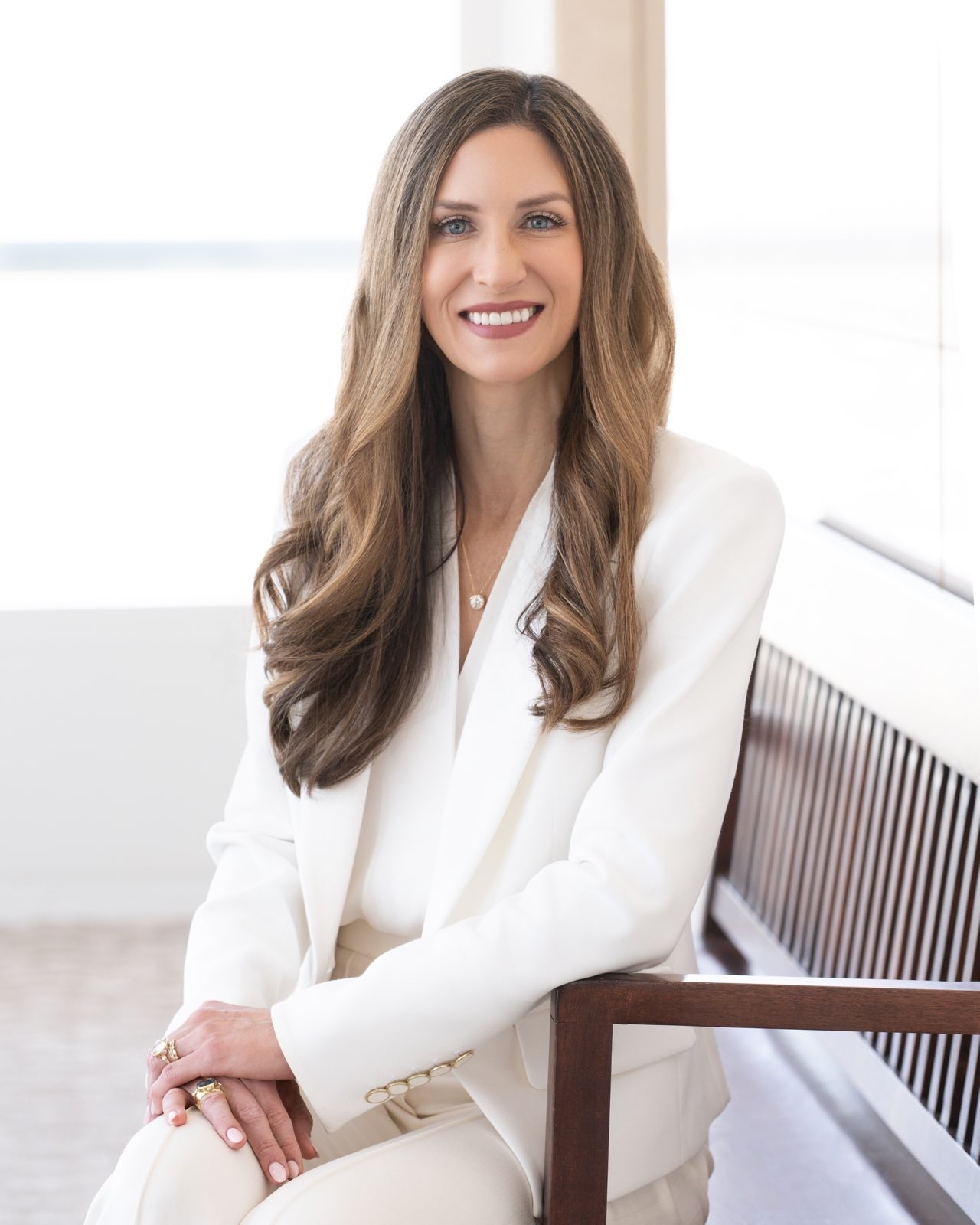
- Official portrait, 2025

Judge of the United States District Court for the Middle District of Florida
- Incumbent
- Assumed office November 20, 2020
- Appointed by: Donald Trump
- Preceded by: Virginia Hernandez Covington

Personal details
- Born: Kathryn Anne Kimball; August 14, 1987 (age 38) Lakeland, Florida, U.S.
- Spouse: Chad Mizelle (m. 2016)
- Education: Covenant College (BA); University of Florida (JD)

Kathryn Anne Kimball Mizelle (née Kimball; born August 14, 1987) is a United States district judge for the United States District Court for the Middle District of Florida.

== Early life and education ==
Mizelle was born in 1987 in Lakeland, Florida. After graduating from Lakeland Christian School in 2005, she attended Covenant College, graduating in 2009 with a Bachelor of Arts, summa cum laude, in economics with a minor in philosophy. She then attended the University of Florida's Fredric G. Levin College of Law, where she was the executive notes and comments editor of the Florida Law Review. She graduated in 2012 with a Juris Doctor with highest honors.

== Career ==
Upon graduating from law school, Mizelle served as a law clerk to Judge James S. Moody Jr. of the United States District Court for the Middle District of Florida from 2012 to 2013 and to Judge William H. Pryor Jr. of the United States Court of Appeals for the Eleventh Circuit from 2013 to 2014.

She worked as a trial attorney in the Tax Division of the United States Department of Justice from 2014 to 2017, and was detailed as a Special Assistant United States Attorney for the Eastern District of Virginia from 2014 to 2015. Mizelle was counsel to the United States Associate Attorney General from 2017 to 2018.

In 2018, she briefly clerked for Judge Gregory G. Katsas of the United States Court of Appeals for the District of Columbia Circuit, and then clerked for Justice Clarence Thomas of the Supreme Court of the United States from 2018 to 2019.

Mizelle is currently an adjunct professor at the University of Florida Levin College of Law. She has been a member of the Federalist Society since 2012.

Before becoming a judge, Mizelle was an associate at Jones Day from 2019 to 2020, where she worked on civil and criminal litigation and appeals.

=== Federal judicial service ===
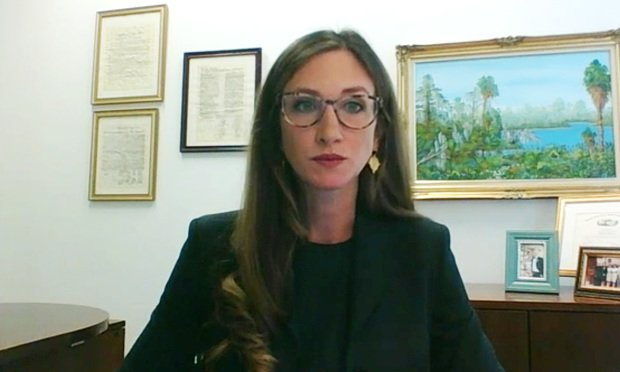
Mizelle in 2020 during her confirmation hearing.

On August 12, 2020, President Donald Trump announced his intent to nominate Mizelle to serve as a United States district judge of the United States District Court for the Middle District of Florida. At the age of 33, she was the youngest person chosen by Trump for a lifetime judicial appointment. On September 8, 2020, her nomination was sent to the Senate to fill the seat vacated by Judge Virginia M. Hernandez Covington, who assumed senior status on July 12, 2020. On September 9, 2020, a hearing on her nomination was held before the Senate Judiciary Committee. The American Bar Association (ABA)'s Standing Committee on the Federal Judiciary, which rates the qualifications of federal judicial nominees, rated Mizelle "Not Qualified" to serve as a federal trial court judge, noting that "Since her admission to the bar Ms. Mizelle has not tried a case, civil or criminal, as lead or co-counsel." Before her appointment, the nominee had only taken part in two trials — both one-day trials in a state court conducted while she was still in law school. She had eight years of legal experience at the time of her nomination; the ABA typically requires 12 years to give a nominee a rating of "Qualified". The ABA said Mizelle "has a very keen intellect, a strong work ethic and an impressive resume... her integrity and demeanor are not in question." But, the committee wrote, "These attributes... simply do not compensate for the short time she has actually practiced law and her lack of meaningful trial experience." On October 22, 2020, the Judiciary Committee reported her nomination by a 12–0 vote, with all Democratic senators boycotting the meeting.

On November 18, 2020, the United States Senate invoked cloture on her nomination by a 49–43 vote. Mizelle's nomination was confirmed later that day by a 49–41 vote. She received her judicial commission on November 20, 2020.

She joined the first group of judges appointed by a president who had lost reelection at the time of confirmation since Jimmy Carter's appointment of Stephen Breyer to the United States Court of Appeals for the First Circuit in November 1980.

=== Notable rulings ===
- On April 18, 2022, Mizelle struck down the federal COVID-19 mask mandate on airplanes and public transportation, ruling that the Centers for Disease Control and Prevention (CDC) had no authority to implement such a mandate. Mizelle also stated that the CDC improperly invoked the good faith exception to the Administrative Procedure Act's notice-and-comment rulemaking process. The US Supreme Court had three times refused to issue injunctions against the CDC's mask mandate. In her ruling, Mizelle argued that the 1944 statute that gives the federal government authority to combat communicable disease as part of "sanitation" efforts was being misapplied because sanitation solely referred to "measures that clean something" and masks do not clean anything in that regard. She also argued that travelers were being restricted from the freedom to travel based on an arbitrary condition, and that longstanding case law surrounding the right to enforce "detention and quarantine" by the government was applicable only to those who were actually sick. On April 20, the Department of Justice announced it would be appealing the ruling after the CDC deemed the mandate was still necessary. According to Georges C. Benjamin of the American Public Health Association, Mizelle's ruling had the potential to set a precedent reducing government's ability to respond in public health emergencies.
- On January 12, 2024, Mizelle ruled that prohibiting the possession of firearms in post offices is unconstitutional, citing New York State Rifle & Pistol Association, Inc. v. Bruen.

== Personal life ==
Mizelle is married to lawyer Chad Mizelle who has worked for both Trump administrations.

== See also ==
- List of law clerks for the tenth seat of the Supreme Court of the United States

Legal offices
Preceded by Virginia M. Hernandez Covington	Judge of the United States District Court for the Middle District of Florida; 2020–present	Incumbent
