= William J. Castagna =

American judge (1924–2020)

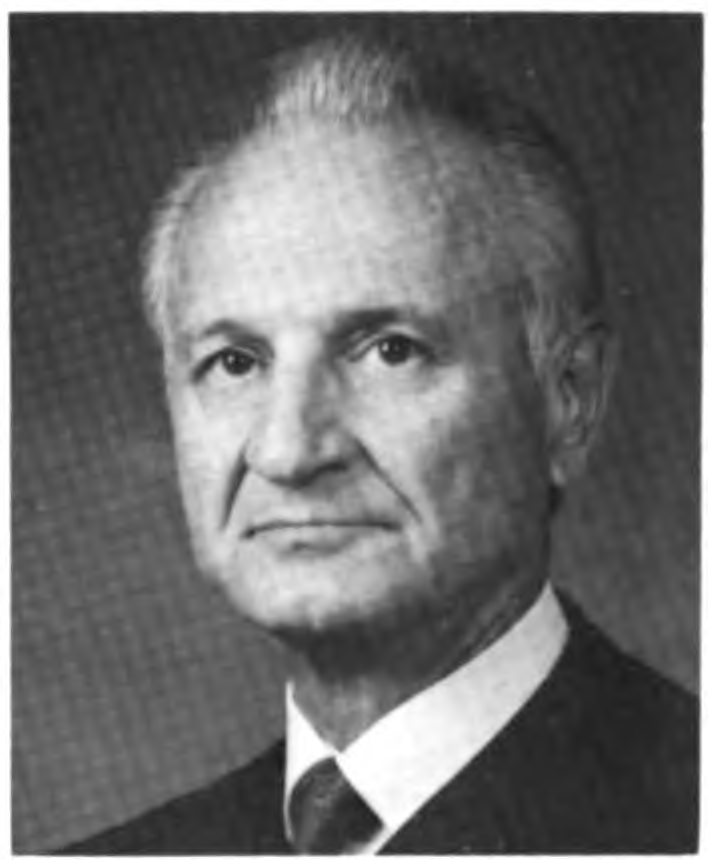

Senior Judge of the United States District Court for the Middle District of Florida
- In office June 29, 1992 – December 18, 2020

Judge of the United States District Court for the Middle District of Florida
- In office July 24, 1979 – June 29, 1992
- Appointed by: Jimmy Carter
- Preceded by: Seat established by 92 Stat. 1629
- Succeeded by: Susan C. Bucklew

Personal details
- Born: William John Castagna; June 25, 1924 Philadelphia, Pennsylvania, U.S.
- Died: December 18, 2020 (aged 96)
- Education: Fredric G. Levin College of Law (LLB, JD)

William John Castagna (June 25, 1924 – December 18, 2020) was a United States district judge of the United States District Court for the Middle District of Florida.

== Education and career ==
Born in Philadelphia, Pennsylvania, Castagna served in the United States Air Force from 1943 to 1945. He received his Bachelor of Laws from the Fredric G. Levin College of Law at the University of Florida in 1949 and a Juris Doctor from the same institution in 1967. He was in private practice in Miami, Florida, from 1949 to 1950 and in Clearwater from 1950 to 1979.

== Federal judicial service ==
United States President Jimmy Carter nominated Castagna to the United States District Court for the Middle District of Florida on June 5, 1979, to a new seat created by 92 Stat. 1629. Confirmed by the Senate on July 23, 1979, and received commission a day later. Castagna assumed senior status on June 29, 1992. He died on December 18, 2020, at the age of 96.

Legal offices
Preceded by Seat established by 92 Stat. 1629	Judge of the United States District Court for the Middle District of Florida; 1979–1992	Succeeded by Susan C. Bucklew
