= Paul G. Byron =

American judge (born 1959)

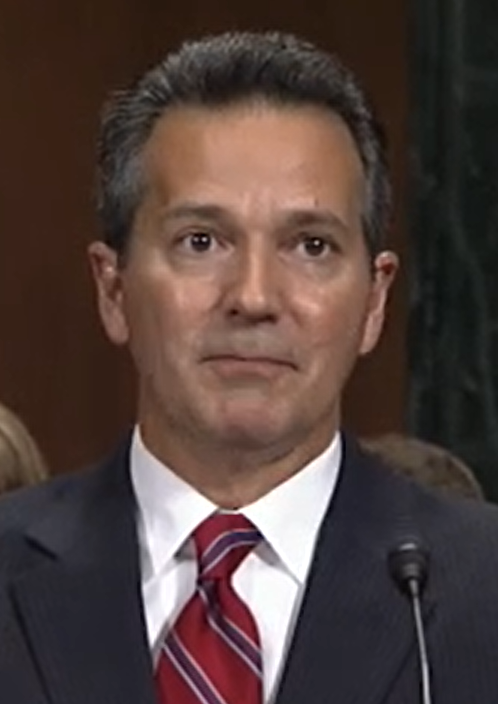

Judge of the United States District Court for the Middle District of Florida
- Incumbent
- Assumed office June 24, 2014
- Appointed by: Barack Obama
- Preceded by: James S. Moody Jr.

Personal details
- Born: July 1, 1959 (age 66) Queens, New York, U.S.
- Education: Miami Dade College (AA); University of Michigan (AB); Louisiana State University (JD)

Paul Gregory Byron (born July 1, 1959) is a United States district judge of the United States District Court for the Middle District of Florida.

== Biography ==
Byron received an Associate of Arts degree in 1981 from Miami Dade College. He received an Artium Baccalaureus degree in 1983 from the University of Michigan. He received a Juris Doctor in 1986 from the Louisiana State University Paul M. Hebert Law Center. He began his legal career as a Judge Advocate in the Judge Advocate General's Corps of the United States Army from 1986 to 1990. From 1991 to 2001, he served as an assistant United States attorney in the Middle District of Florida. From 2001 to 2003, he served as a senior trial attorney on the International Criminal Tribunal for the former Yugoslavia. From 2003 to 2004, he was a partner at the law firm of NeJame, LaFay, Barker, Byron, P.A. From 2004 to 2005, he worked in the Asset Forfeiture Section of the United States Department of Justice. Beginning in 2005, he was a partner at Overchuck & Byron, P.A., where his practice focused on civil litigation in state and Federal court.

=== Federal judicial service ===
On February 6, 2014, President Barack Obama nominated Byron to serve as a United States district judge of the United States District Court for the Middle District of Florida, to the seat being vacated by Judge James S. Moody, Jr., who assumed senior status on March 31, 2014. He received a hearing before the United States Senate Judiciary Committee on April 1, 2014. On May 8, 2014, his nomination was reported out of committee by voice vote . On June 19, 2014 Senate Majority Leader Harry Reid filed a motion to invoke cloture on the nomination. On June 23, 2014, the United States Senate invoked cloture on his nomination by a 53–30 vote. On Tuesday June 24, 2014, his nomination was confirmed by a 94–0 vote. He received his judicial commission on the same day.

Legal offices
Preceded by James S. Moody, Jr.	Judge of the United States District Court for the Middle District of Florida; 2014–present	Incumbent
