= Sheri Polster Chappell =

American judge (born 1962)

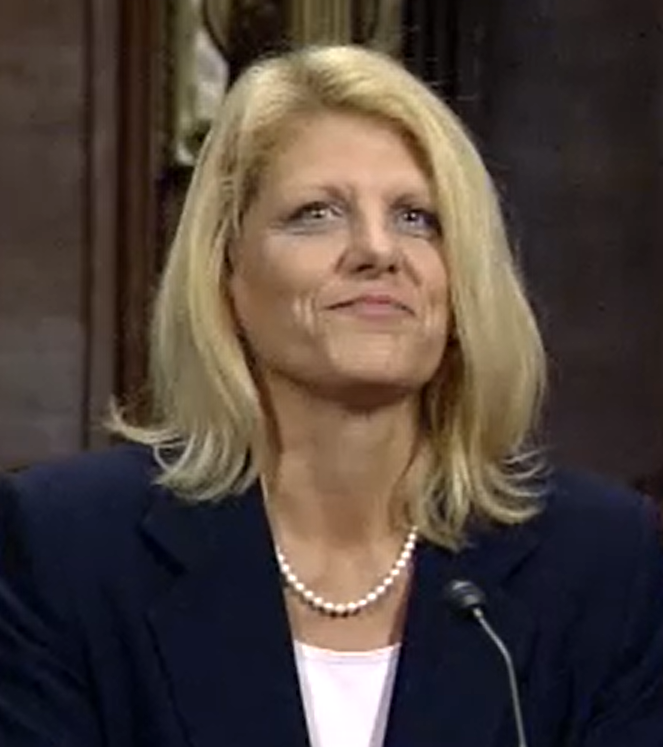

Judge of the United States District Court for the Middle District of Florida
- Incumbent
- Assumed office May 22, 2013
- Appointed by: Barack Obama
- Preceded by: Gregory A. Presnell

Magistrate Judge of the United States District Court for the Middle District of Florida
- In office 2003 – May 22, 2013

Personal details
- Born: Sheri Jean Polster; 1962 (age 63–64) Sheboygan, Wisconsin, U.S.
- Education: University of Wisconsin (BA); Nova Southeastern University (JD)

Sheri Jean Polster Chappell (born 1962) is a United States district judge of the United States District Court for the Middle District of Florida.

== Early life and education ==
Chappell was born Sheri Jean Polster in Wisconsin and attended Kiel High School in Kiel, Wisconsin, where she graduated in 1980. Chappell attended the University of Wisconsin–Eau Claire from 1980 to 1982 and received her Bachelor of Arts degree in 1984 from the University of Wisconsin–Madison. She received her Juris Doctor in 1987 from Shepard Broad Law Center at Nova Southeastern University.

== Career ==
She served as an Assistant State Attorney in the Twentieth Judicial Circuit of Florida from 1987 to 2000. She served as a County Court Judge in Lee County from 2000 to 2003. From 2003 to 2013, she served as a United States magistrate judge for the Middle District of Florida.

=== Federal judicial service ===
On June 25, 2012, President Barack Obama nominated Chappell to be a United States District Judge for the United States District Court for the Middle District of Florida, to the seat vacated by Judge Gregory A. Presnell, who assumed senior status on April 1, 2012. On September 19, 2012, the Senate Judiciary Committee held a hearing on her nomination, on December 6, 2012, her nomination was reported out of committee by a voice vote. On January 2, 2013, her nomination was returned to the President, due to the sine die adjournment of the Senate. She was renominated for the same office on January 3, 2013. On March 7, 2013, her nomination was reported out of committee by a voice vote. The Senate confirmed her nomination on May 20, 2013, by a 90–0 vote. She received her commission on May 22, 2013.

Legal offices
Preceded by Gregory A. Presnell	Judge of the United States District Court for the Middle District of Florida; 2013–present	Incumbent
