= HeightMax =

Nutrition pills

HeightMax Concentrate and HeightMax Plus were purported height-enhancing pills for children and young adults marketed by Sunny Health Nutrition Technology & Products, Inc. The Federal Trade Commission filed a complaint against the company and its owner, leading to the product being discontinued and a fine paid.

== Federal Trade Commission enforcement action ==
On or about November 21, 2006, the Federal Trade Commission (FTC) filed a complaint against Sunny Health Nutrition Technology & Products, Inc. and its owner, Sunny Sia, charging the defendants with making false and unsubstantiated claims for HeightMax Concentrate and HeightMax Plus, as well as for two other supplements, Liposan Ultra Chitosan Fat Blocker and Osteo-Vite. The FTC complaint charged that claims for the pills were unsubstantiated or false and that the defendants invented William Thomson, a supposed expert who appeared in the advertisements. According to the complaint, the advertisements for HeightMax Concentrate and HeightMax Plus misrepresented that:

- HeightMax increases height in users ages 12–25 over what they would achieve without the product;
- HeightMax causes users to grow an additional 2 to 3 inches in 6 months;
- Clinical tests prove that: (i) HeightMax increases the height of teenagers and young adults; and (ii) regular use of HeightMax for 6 months causes a 10% to 25% gain in height, and use for more than a year causes a 20% to 35% gain in height;
- HeightMax increases lean body mass and reduces body fat in users ages 12–25; and
- William Thomson, an expert with a Ph.D. in Biochemistry, created HeightMax after years of research and clinical trials.

The FTC complaint also alleged that the defendants made unsubstantiated or false claims for Liposan Ultra Chitosan Fat Blocker, a weight loss supplement, and Osteo-Vite, marketed to older consumers for bone-building.

To settle the charges, defendants Sunny Health Nutrition Technology & Products, Inc. and its owner, Sunny Sia, agreed to pay $375,000 in consumer redress. The settlement also held the defendants potentially liable for $1.9 million in the event that they misrepresented their finances. The order to settle the FTC's charges requires that claims for any dietary supplement, food, or drug must be true, non-misleading, and substantiated. In addition, it prohibits the defendants from misrepresenting endorsements, including the existence or expertise of any endorser.

On November 30, 2006 the Honorable Susan C. Bucklew, Federal District Court Judge, signed a Stipulated Judgment requiring defendants to pay $375,000 based on the accuracy of sworn financial statements. The Judgment included an avalanche clause, requiring payment of full redress for $1.9 million if the financial statements were not accurate.

On April 24, 2007, the FTC announced that the defendants shall be required to pay the full $1.9 Million after hidden assets were discovered. In the settlement, the $1.6 million balance of the judgment had been suspended based on sworn financial disclosure documents showing inability to pay. Shortly after that settlement, the FTC discovered that the defendants kept at least $1.8 million in an undisclosed PayPal account. The FTC immediately obtained a temporary restraining order to freeze the funds, which was granted on December 8, 2006. The defendants were ordered to pay the entire $1.9 million.

Judge Bucklew's new order, signed on February 22, 2007, and agreed to by the defendants, required them to pay the entire $1.9 million, using the funds in the account at PayPal and other sources if necessary. The conduct prohibitions from the previously entered order remain unchanged. The FTC set up a refund program for HeightMax purchasers, using the money collected.

== See also ==
- Consumer protection
- Health fraud
