= Ralph Wilson Nimmons Jr. =

American judge (1938–2003)

Judge of the United States District Court for the Middle District of Florida
- In office July 2, 1991 – November 24, 2003
- Appointed by: George H. W. Bush
- Preceded by: Seat established by 104 Stat. 5089
- Succeeded by: Virginia M. Hernandez Covington

Personal details
- Born: Ralph Wilson Nimmons Jr. September 14, 1938 Dallas, Texas
- Died: November 24, 2003 (aged 65) Jacksonville, Florida
- Education: University of Florida (BA); University of Florida College of Law (JD)

Ralph Wilson Nimmons Jr. (September 14, 1938 – November 24, 2003) was an American lawyer and United States district judge of the United States District Court for the Middle District of Florida.

Nimmons was nominated by President George H. W. Bush on May 23, 1991, to a new seat created by 104 Stat. 5089; He was confirmed by the United States Senate on June 27, 1991, and received commission on July 2, 1991. Nimmons served in this position until his death on November 24, 2003.

== Early life and education ==
Nimmons was born in 1938 in Dallas, Texas. He received his Bachelor of Arts degree in 1960 from the University of Florida and his Juris Doctor in 1963 from the University of Florida College of Law.

== Professional career ==
Nimmons was in private practice in Jacksonville from 1963 to 1965. He served as assistant public defender in Jacksonville from 1965 to 1969 and assistant Florida state attorney from 1969 to 1971. Nimmons served as assistant general counsel to the City of Jacksonville in 1971 to 1973. In 1973, Nimmons returned to private practice in Jacksonville. Nimmons served as a judge of the Fourth Judicial Circuit of Florida from 1977 to 1983. He served as a judge of the Florida First District Court of Appeal from 1983 to 1991.

== Failed federal district court nomination ==
On September 17, 1980, President Carter nominated Nimmons to a seat on the United States District Court for the Middle District of Florida. With the nomination coming so late in a presidential election year, senators did not proceed with Nimmons' nomination, and President Reagan chose not to renominate Nimmons to the seat after he was inaugurated.

== Federal judicial service ==
President George H. W. Bush nominated Nimmons to the United States District Court for the Middle District of Florida on May 23, 1991, to a new seat created by 104 Stat. 5089. Confirmed by the Senate on June 27, 1991, he received commission on July 2, 1991. Nimmons remained on the court until his death in Jacksonville of liver cancer in 2003.

Legal offices
Preceded by Seat established by 104 Stat. 5089	Judge of the United States District Court for the Middle District of Florida; 1991–2003	Succeeded by Virginia M. Hernandez Covington
