= Brian J. Davis =

American judge (born 1953)

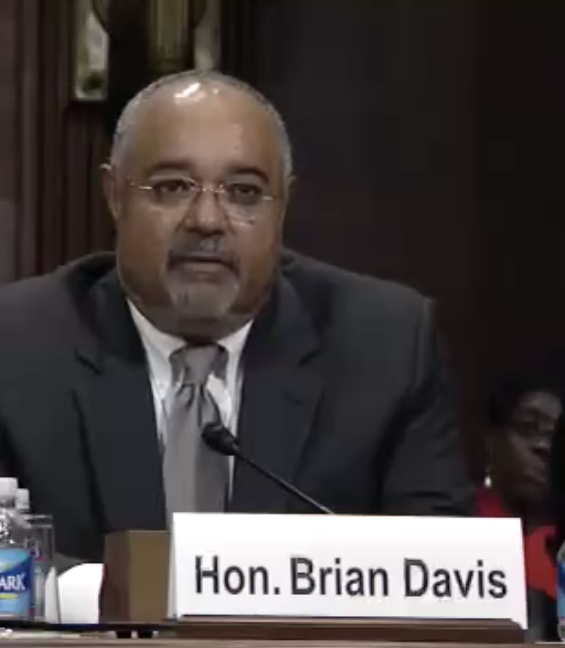

Senior Judge of the United States District Court for the Middle District of Florida
- Incumbent
- Assumed office December 30, 2023

Judge of the United States District Court for the Middle District of Florida
- In office December 26, 2013 – December 30, 2023
- Appointed by: Barack Obama
- Preceded by: Richard A. Lazzara
- Succeeded by: Anne-Leigh Gaylord Moe

Personal details
- Born: Brian Jordan Davis; January 28, 1953 (age 73) Jacksonville, Florida, U.S.
- Education: Princeton University (BA); University of Florida (JD)

Brian Jordan Davis (born January 28, 1953) is a senior United States district judge of the United States District Court for the Middle District of Florida.

== Biography ==
Davis received his Bachelor of Arts degree in 1974 from Princeton University. He received his Juris Doctor from 1980 from the University of Florida Levin College of Law. He worked as an attorney at Mahoney, Hadlow & Adams, P.A. from 1980 to 1982 and at Brown, Terrell, Hogan, Ellis, McClamma & Yegelwel from 1988 to 1991. He worked as an assistant state attorney from 1982 to 1988. He served as chief assistant state attorney in the Fourth Judicial Circuit from 1991 to 1994. He served as a circuit judge for the Fourth Judicial Circuit of Florida from 1994 to 2013.

== Federal judicial service ==
On February 29, 2012, President Barack Obama nominated Davis to serve as a United States District Judge on the United States District Court for the Middle District of Florida. He would replace Judge Richard A. Lazzara, who assumed senior status on December 17, 2011. The Senate Judiciary Committee reported Davis' nomination to the full Senate on June 21, 2012 by a 10–7 vote. Although Davis' nomination had the support of his two home-state senators, several other senators, including Senator Chuck Grassley opposed his nomination, based largely on a speech that Davis gave to his local NAACP chapter in 1995. Grassley had charged that Davis' answers to certain questions suggested a bias in favor of African-Americans and a lack of impartiality. On January 2, 2013, Davis' nomination was returned to the President, due to the sine die adjournment of the Senate. On January 3, 2013, he was renominated to the same office. Davis' nomination was reported out of committee on October 31, 2013 by a 16–2 vote. On December 20, 2013, the United States Senate invoked cloture on his nomination by a 56–36 vote. That same day, his nomination was confirmed by a 68–26 vote. He received his commission on December 26, 2013. Davis assumed senior status on December 30, 2023.

== See also ==
- List of African-American federal judges
- List of African-American jurists

Legal offices
Preceded by Richard A. Lazzara	Judge of the United States District Court for the Middle District of Florida; 2013–2023	Succeeded by Anne-Leigh Gaylord Moe
