= Richard A. Lazzara =

American judge (born 1945)

Richard Allen Lazzara

Senior Judge of the United States District Court for the Middle District of Florida
- Incumbent
- Assumed office December 17, 2011

Judge of the United States District Court for the Middle District of Florida
- In office September 29, 1997 – December 17, 2011
- Appointed by: Bill Clinton
- Preceded by: John H. Moore II
- Succeeded by: Brian J. Davis

Personal details
- Born: Richard Allen Lazzara; December 17, 1945 (age 80) Tampa, Florida
- Education: Loyola University New Orleans (BA); Fredric G. Levin College of Law (JD)

Richard Allen Lazzara (born December 17, 1945) is a senior United States district judge of the United States District Court for the Middle District of Florida.

== Education and career ==
Lazzara was born in Tampa, Florida. He received a Bachelor of Arts degree from Loyola University New Orleans in 1967. He received a Juris Doctor from the Fredric G. Levin College of Law at the University of Florida in 1970. He was a law clerk for the Hillsborough County Solicitor Office, Hillsborough County, Florida in 1970. He was an assistant county solicitor, Hillsborough County from 1970 to 1972. He was an assistant state attorney of Hillsborough County in 1973. He was in private practice of law in Tampa from 1974 to 1986. He was a Judge of the Hillsborough County Court in 1987. He was a Circuit Judge, 13th Judicial Circuit of Florida from 1988 to 1993. He was an Appellate Judge, Second District Court of Appeal, from 1993 to 1997.

== Federal judicial service ==
Lazzara is a United States District Judge of the United States District Court for the Middle District of Florida. Lazzara was nominated by President Bill Clinton on January 7, 1997, to a seat vacated by John H. Moore II. He was confirmed by the United States Senate on September 26, 1997, and received commission on September 29, 1997.

Legal offices
| Preceded by John H. Moore II | Judge of the United States District Court for the Middle District of Florida; 1997–2011 | Succeeded by Brian J. Davis |
