= Susan C. Bucklew =

American judge (born 1942)

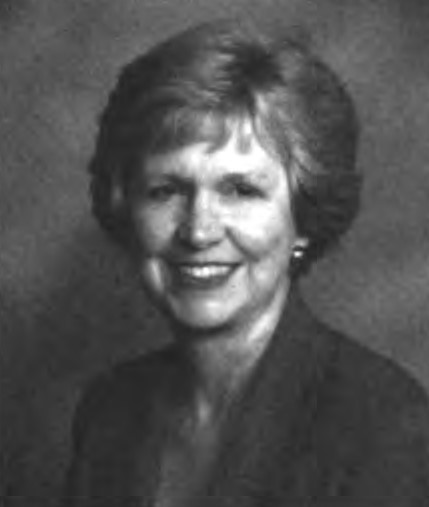

Senior Judge of the United States District Court for the Middle District of Florida
- Incumbent
- Assumed office August 1, 2008

Judge of the United States District Court for the Middle District of Florida
- In office November 24, 1993 – August 1, 2008
- Appointed by: Bill Clinton
- Preceded by: William J. Castagna
- Succeeded by: Charlene Edwards Honeywell

Judge of the Thirteenth Judicial Circuit of Florida
- In office October 1986 – November 1993
- Appointed by: Bob Graham

Judge of the Hillsborough County Court
- In office February 1982 – October 1986
- Appointed by: Bob Graham

Personal details
- Born: Susan Cawthon; May 12, 1942 (age 83) Tampa, Florida, U.S.
- Education: Florida State University (BA); University of South Florida (MA); Stetson University (JD)

Susan Cawthon Bucklew (born May 12, 1942) is an American lawyer, jurist, and former school teacher. She is a senior United States district judge of the United States District Court for the Middle District of Florida.

== Education and career ==
Born in Tampa, Florida, Bucklew received her Bachelor of Arts degree from Florida State University in 1963, her Master of Arts from the University of South Florida in 1968, and her Juris Doctor from the Stetson University College of Law in 1977.

Before becoming a lawyer, she was teacher and taught at Henry B. Plant High School from 1964 to 1965 and again from 1970 to 1972. She also taught at Seminole High School from 1965 to 1967, George D. Chamberlain High School in 1969, and Hillsborough Community College from 1974 to 1975.

She was corporate legal counsel for the Jim Walter Corporation from 1978 to 1982, then served as a county court judge in Hillsborough County Court from 1982 to 1986, and as a circuit judge of the Thirteenth Judicial Circuit of Florida from 1986 to 1993. She served as Director of Cawthon Oil Company.

=== Federal judicial service ===
President Bill Clinton nominated Bucklew to the United States District Court for the Middle District of Florida to the seat vacated by Judge William J. Castagna on October 29, 1993. She was confirmed by the United States Senate on November 20, 1993, and received her commission four days later. Bucklew assumed senior status on August 1, 2008.

== See also ==
- HeightMax (2006-2007)

Legal offices
Preceded by William J. Castagna	Judge of the United States District Court for the Middle District of Florida; 1993–2008	Succeeded by Charlene Edwards Honeywell
