= Ben Krentzman =

American judge (1914–1998)

Senior Judge of the United States District Court for the Middle District of Florida
- In office November 15, 1982 – March 29, 1998

Chief Judge of the United States District Court for the Middle District of Florida
- In office 1981–1982
- Preceded by: George C. Young
- Succeeded by: William Terrell Hodges

Judge of the United States District Court for the Middle District of Florida
- In office June 12, 1967 – November 15, 1982
- Appointed by: Lyndon B. Johnson
- Preceded by: John Milton Bryan Simpson
- Succeeded by: G. Kendall Sharp

Personal details
- Born: Isaac Benjamin Krentzman Jr. March 21, 1914 Milton, Florida
- Died: March 29, 1998 (aged 84) Clearwater, Florida
- Education: University of Florida (B.S.); Fredric G. Levin College of Law (J.D.)

Isaac Benjamin Krentzman Jr. (March 21, 1914 – March 29, 1998) was a United States district judge of the United States District Court for the Middle District of Florida.

== Education and career ==
Born in Milton, Florida, Krentzman received a Bachelor of Science degree from University of Florida in 1935. He received a Juris Doctor from Fredric G. Levin College of Law at the University of Florida in 1938. He was in private practice of law in Clearwater, Florida from 1938 to 1941 and 1946 to 1967. He was in the United States Army as a Lieutenant Colonel from 1941 to 1946. He was town attorney of Largo, Florida from 1946 to 1956. He was city attorney of Clearwater from 1949 to 1950 and from 1956 to 1958. He was special counsel for the Florida State Road Department from 1960 to 1963.

== Federal judicial service ==
Krentzman was nominated by President Lyndon B. Johnson on May 24, 1967, to a seat on the United States District Court for the Middle District of Florida vacated by Judge John Milton Bryan Simpson. He was confirmed by the United States Senate on June 12, 1967, and received his commission the same day. He served as Chief Judge from 1981 to 1982. He assumed senior status on November 15, 1982. His service was terminated on March 29, 1998, due to his death in Clearwater.

== Sources ==
- A biographical work by Morison Buck, Ben Krentzman (1914–1998): Gentle in spirit, resolute in robe in 2000.

Legal offices
Preceded by John Milton Bryan Simpson	Judge of the United States District Court for the Middle District of Florida; 1967–1982	Succeeded by G. Kendall Sharp
Preceded by George C. Young	Chief Judge of the United States District Court for the Middle District of Florida; 1981–1982	Succeeded by William Terrell Hodges
