= G. Kendall Sharp =

American judge (1934–2022)

Senior Judge of the United States District Court for the Middle District of Florida
- In office January 1, 2000 – March 24, 2022

Judge of the United States District Court for the Middle District of Florida
- In office November 15, 1983 – January 1, 2000
- Appointed by: Ronald Reagan
- Preceded by: Ben Krentzman
- Succeeded by: John Antoon

Personal details
- Born: George Kendall Sharp; December 30, 1934 Chicago, Illinois, U.S.
- Died: March 24, 2022 (aged 87)
- Education: Yale University (BA); University of Virginia School of Law (JD)

George Kendall Sharp (December 30, 1934 – March 24, 2022) was a United States district judge of the United States District Court for the Middle District of Florida.

== Education and career ==
Sharp was born on December 30, 1934, in Chicago, Illinois. He received a Bachelor of Arts degree from Yale University in 1957. He received a Juris Doctor from the University of Virginia School of Law in 1963. He was a United States Naval Reserve Captain from 1957 to 1988. He was on active duty from 1957 to 1960. He was in private practice of law in Vero Beach, Florida, from 1963 to 1978. He was a public defender for the 19th Judicial Circuit from 1964 to 1968. He was a school board attorney of Indian River County from 1968 to 1978. He was a judge of the 19th Circuit Court in Vero Beach from 1978 to 1983. He was a member of the faculty of Indian River Community College (now Indian River State College) in Fort Pierce in 1979.

== Federal judicial service ==
Sharp was nominated by President Ronald Reagan on November 1, 1983, to a seat on the United States District Court for the Middle District of Florida vacated by Judge Ben Krentzman. He was confirmed by the United States Senate on November 15, 1983, and received commission on November 16, 1983. He assumed senior status on January 1, 2000. He served in the Orlando division of the court. He died March 24, 2022.

=== Notable cases ===
In 1991, Sharp "rejected charges by the National Highway Traffic Safety Administration that five automobile-window tinting shops in Florida violated federal safety standards by installing window film that blocked too much light." Sharp also presided over the 2008 case of former Backstreet Boys and NSYNC manager Lou Pearlman in connection with a long-running fraudulent investment scheme. Sharp sentenced Pearlman to 25 years in prison.

== Sources ==
Legal offices
Preceded by Ben Krentzman	Judge of the United States District Court for the Middle District of Florida; 1983–2000	Succeeded by John Antoon
