= Kyle Dudek =

American judge (born 1985)

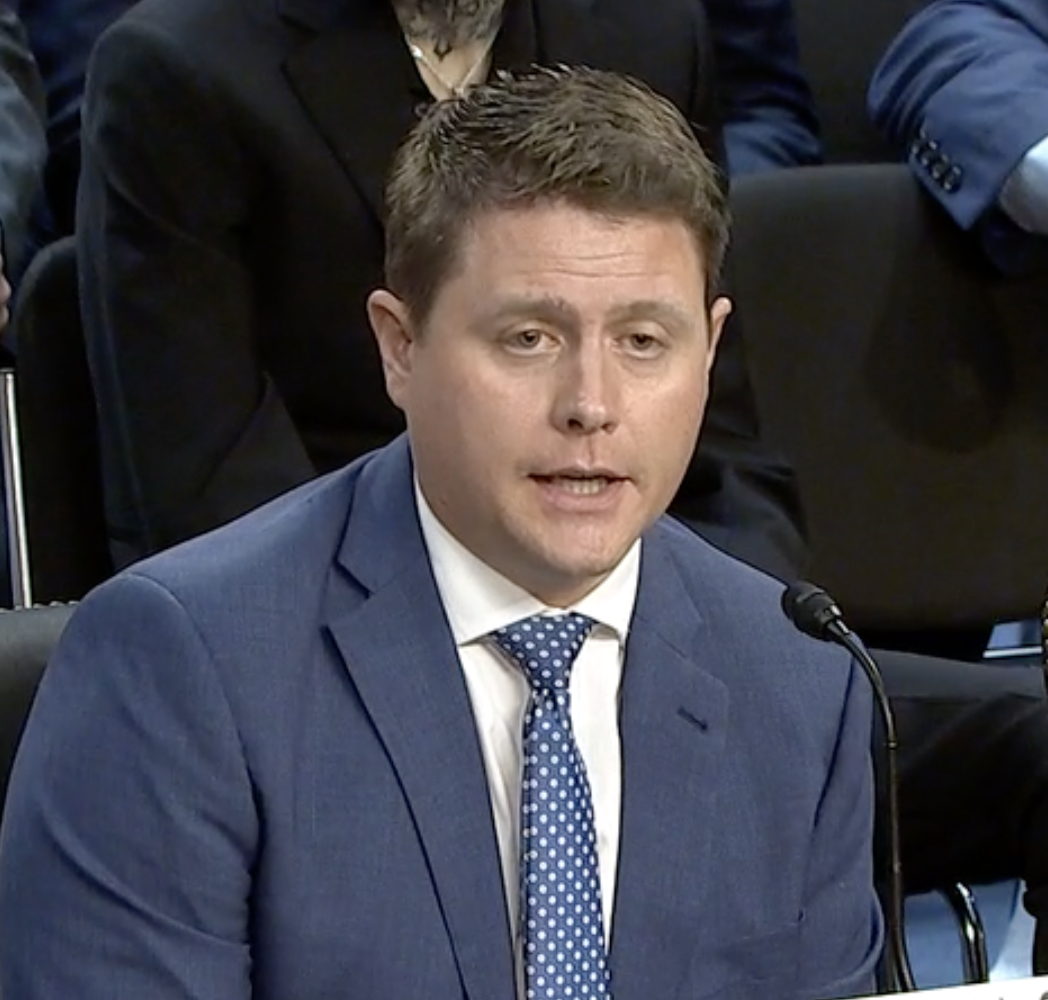

Judge of the United States District Court for the Middle District of Florida
- Incumbent
- Assumed office September 11, 2025
- Appointed by: Donald Trump
- Preceded by: Charlene Edwards Honeywell

Magistrate Judge of the United States District Court for the Middle District of Florida
- In office July 1, 2022 – September 11, 2025

Personal details
- Born: Kyle Christopher Dudek; 1985 (age 40–41) Syracuse, New York, U.S.
- Education: Cornell University (BS); George Mason University (JD)

Kyle Christopher Dudek (born 1985) is an American lawyer who has served as a United States district judge of the United States District Court for the Middle District of Florida since 2025.

== Early life and education ==
Dudek was born in 1985 in Syracuse, New York. He earned a Bachelor of Science degree from Cornell University, magna cum laude in 2007, and Juris Doctor from George Mason University School of Law (now known as Antonin Scalia Law School), magna cum laude in 2010.

== Career ==
After graduating law school, Dudek was a law clerk for Judge Jonathan C. Thacher of the 19th Judicial Circuit Court of Virginia from 2010 to 2011. He was an associate at McGuireWoods in Tysons Corner from 2011 to 2012 and a staff attorney for the United States District Court for the Northern District of New York from 2012 to 2013. Dudek also served as a law clerk to Judge James C. Cacheris of the United States District Court for the Eastern District of Virginia from 2013 to 2014 and for Judge G. Steven Agee of the United States Court of Appeals for the Fourth Circuit from 2014 to 2016. He was formerly a shareholder at the law firm of Henderson Franklin Starnes & Holt, P.A., in Fort Myers. He also served as an adjunct professor at Ave Maria School of Law, where he teaches a class focusing on civil rights litigation.

== Federal judicial service ==
Dudek was appointed as a United States magistrate judge of the United States District Court for the Middle District of Florida on July 1, 2022.

=== District court service ===
On May 28, 2025, President Donald Trump announced his intention to nominate Dudek to the United States District Court for the Middle District of Florida. On June 16, 2025, Dudek's nomination was sent to the U.S. Senate. Dudek would fill the seat vacated by Judge Charlene Edwards Honeywell, who assumed senior status on December 4, 2023. He was confirmed by the Senate by a 53–45 vote. He received his judicial commission on September 11, 2025.

=== Notable cases ===
Upon confirmation, Dudek was assigned several open cases, including a securities lawsuit and a derivative action against the retailer Target related to its 2023 Pride collection, on which he previously served as the magistrate judge.

Legal offices
Preceded by Charlene Edwards Honeywell	Judge of the United States District Court for the Middle District of Florida; 2025–present	Incumbent
