= Wendy Berger =

American judge (born 1968)

Judge of the United States District Court for the Middle District of Florida
- Incumbent
- Assumed office July 29, 2019
- Appointed by: Donald Trump
- Preceded by: John E. Steele

Judge of the Florida Fifth District Court of Appeal
- In office September 2012 – July 29, 2019
- Appointed by: Rick Scott
- Preceded by: David A. Monaco
- Succeeded by: Daniel Traver

Judge of the Seventh Judicial Circuit Court of Florida
- In office April 2005 – September 2012
- Appointed by: Jeb Bush
- Preceded by: Robert Mathis
- Succeeded by: Howard Maltz

Personal details
- Born: Wendy Leigh Williams; December 1, 1968 (age 57) Athens, Georgia, U.S.
- Education: Florida State University (BS, JD)

Wendy Leigh Williams Berger (née Williams; born December 1, 1968) is a United States district judge of the United States District Court for the Middle District of Florida. She previously served as a Florida state District Judge of the Fifth District Court of Appeal.

== Education ==
Berger earned her Bachelor of Science, cum laude, from Florida State University and her Juris Doctor from the Florida State University College of Law, where she was a member of the Florida State University Law Review.

== Legal career ==
Berger spent seven years prosecuting criminal cases as an Assistant State Attorney. Before ascending to the bench, Berger served from January 2001 until May 2005 as Assistant General Counsel in the Executive Office of the Governor, which was during the gubernatorial tenure of Jeb Bush.

== State judicial service ==
In May 2005, Berger was appointed by Governor Jeb Bush to serve as a Circuit Judge in the Seventh Judicial Circuit. During her service on the circuit court, Berger presided over the civil and probate divisions (2005–2006) and adult felony division (2006–2012) in St. Augustine, Florida. She was also the presiding judge of the St. Johns County Adult Drug Court Program (2005–2012). On August 21, 2012, Governor Rick Scott appointed Berger to the Fifth District Court of Appeal. In 2016, she was one of three finalists for an appointment to the Supreme Court of Florida.

== Federal judicial service ==
Berger was one of four names sent to Senators Marco Rubio and Bill Nelson. On April 10, 2018, President Donald Trump nominated Berger to serve as a United States District Judge of the United States District Court for the Middle District of Florida. She was nominated to the seat vacated by Judge John E. Steele, who assumed senior status on June 3, 2015. On October 17, 2018, a hearing on her nomination was held before the Senate Judiciary Committee.

On January 3, 2019, her nomination was returned to the President under Rule XXXI, Paragraph 6 of the United States Senate. On January 23, 2019, President Trump announced his intent to renominate Berger for a federal judgeship. Her nomination was sent to the Senate later that day. On February 7, 2019, her nomination was reported out of committee by a 12–10 vote. On July 24, 2019, the Senate invoked cloture on her nomination by a 55–37 vote. Her nomination was confirmed later that day by a 54–37 vote. She received her judicial commission on July 29, 2019.

== Professional memberships ==
Berger is a part of the St. Johns County Bar Association, the Orange County Bar Association, The Florida Supreme Court Committee on Civil Jury Instructions, the Florida Bar Criminal Procedure Rules Committee, the Florida Bar Appellate Practice Section's Executive Council, the Dunn Blount Inn of Court, and the Federalist Society.

== Personal life ==
Berger lives with her husband, Larry, in St. Augustine with their two children.

Legal offices
| Preceded by Robert Mathis | Judge of the Seventh Judicial Circuit Court of Florida; 2005–2012 | Succeeded by Howard Maltz |
| Preceded by David A. Monaco | Judge of the Florida Fifth District Court of Appeal; 2012–2019 | Succeeded by Daniel Traver |
| Preceded by John E. Steele | Judge of the United States District Court for the Middle District of Florida; 2019–present | Incumbent |
