= Virginia M. Hernandez Covington =

American judge (born 1955)

Senior Judge of the United States District Court for the Middle District of Florida
- Incumbent
- Assumed office July 12, 2020

Judge of the United States District Court for the Middle District of Florida
- In office September 10, 2004 – July 12, 2020
- Appointed by: George W. Bush
- Preceded by: Ralph Wilson Nimmons Jr.
- Succeeded by: Kathryn Kimball Mizelle

Personal details
- Born: 1955 (age 70–71) Tampa, Florida, U.S.
- Education: University of Tampa (BS, MBA); Georgetown University Law Center (JD)

Virginia Maria Hernandez Covington (born 1955) is a senior United States district judge of the United States District Court for the Middle District of Florida.

== Early life and education ==
Covington was born in 1955 in Tampa, Florida. She received her Bachelor of Science degree cum laude from the University of Tampa in 1976, where she received the Outstanding Female Graduate Award. She received her Master of Business Administration from the University of Tampa in 1977 and her Juris Doctor from Georgetown University Law Center in 1980. At Georgetown she was elected to the Tax Lawyer law journal.

== Career ==
Covington served as a trial attorney for the Federal Trade Commission from 1980 to 1981. She served as an assistant state attorney for the 13th Judicial Circuit of Florida (Hillsborough County) from 1982 to 1983. Covington served as an Assistant U.S. Attorney for the Middle District of Florida from 1983 to 2001, working in the United States Department of Justice Civil Division from 1983 to 1988 and as Assistant U.S. Attorney as chief of the Asset Forfeiture Section in the United States Department of Justice Criminal Division from 1989 to 2001. On September 25, 2001, Florida Governor Jeb Bush appointed Covington to the Florida Second District Court of Appeal.

== Federal judicial service ==
President George W. Bush nominated Covington to the United States District Court for the Middle District of Florida on April 20, 2004, to the seat vacated by Ralph Wilson Nimmons, Jr. She was confirmed by the Senate on September 7, 2004, she received her commission three days later. Covington serves on the Tampa Division of the court. She assumed senior status on July 12, 2020.

== See also ==
- List of Hispanic and Latino American jurists
- List of first women lawyers and judges in Florida

== Sources ==
Legal offices
Preceded by Ralph Wilson Nimmons, Jr.	Judge of the United States District Court for the Middle District of Florida; 2004–2020	Succeeded by Kathryn Kimball Mizelle
