= John H. Moore II =

American judge

John Henry Moore II

Senior Judge of the United States District Court for the Middle District of Florida
- In office December 31, 1995 – July 19, 2013

Chief Judge of the United States District Court for the Middle District of Florida
- In office 1992–1995
- Preceded by: Susan H. Black
- Succeeded by: Elizabeth A. Kovachevich

Judge of the United States District Court for the Middle District of Florida
- In office December 1, 1981 – December 31, 1995
- Appointed by: Ronald Reagan
- Preceded by: Seat established by 92 Stat. 1629
- Succeeded by: Richard A. Lazzara

Personal details
- Born: John Henry Moore II; August 5, 1929 Atlantic City, New Jersey
- Died: July 19, 2013 (aged 83) Jacksonville, Florida
- Education: Syracuse University (B.S.); Fredric G. Levin College of Law (J.D.)

John Henry Moore II (August 5, 1929 – July 19, 2013) was an American lawyer and United States district judge of the United States District Court for the Middle District of Florida.

== Education and career ==
Born in Atlantic City, New Jersey, Moore received his Bachelor of Science degree from Syracuse University in 1952 and his Juris Doctor from the University of Florida College of Law in 1961. At Syracuse, he was a member of the Syracuse Orange men's crew in 1951–52.

Moore served in the Naval Reserve from 1948 to 1971, and served on active duty in Korea before retiring with the rank of commander. Moore was in private practice in Atlanta, Georgia in 1961 with the firm of Fisher and Phillips before moving to Fort Lauderdale, Florida where he was a partner with the firms of Fleming, O'Bryan and Fleming and then Turner, Shaw and Moore from 1961 to 1967. Moore also served as attorney for the School Board of Broward County.

== State judicial service ==
Moore served as a judge of the 17th Judicial Circuit of Florida from 1967 to 1977, serving as chief judge of that court from 1975 to 1977. Moore was nominated to United States District Court for the Southern District of Florida in 1976, but the Senate took no action. Moore served as a judge on the Florida Fourth District Court of Appeal from 1977 to 1981.

== Federal judicial service ==
President Ronald Reagan nominated Moore to the United States District Court for the Middle District of Florida on November 4, 1981, to a new seat created by 92 Stat. 1629. Confirmed by the United States Senate on November 24, 1981, he received his commission on December 1, 1981. Moore served as Chief Judge from 1992 to 1995 and assumed senior status on December 31, 1995. Moore served with the Jacksonville division of the court. He died at his home in Jacksonville on July 19, 2013.

== Sources ==
Legal offices
| Preceded by Seat established by 92 Stat. 1629 | Judge of the United States District Court for the Middle District of Florida; 1981–1995 | Succeeded by Richard A. Lazzara |
| Preceded by Susan H. Black | Chief Judge of the United States District Court for the Middle District of Florida; 1992–1995 | Succeeded by Elizabeth A. Kovachevich |
