= Chad Mizelle =

American lawyer

- Mizelle in 2020

Chief of Staff to the United States Department of Justice
- In office January 20, 2025 – October 2025
- President: Donald Trump
- Preceded by: Adam M. Golodner
- Succeeded by: Office vacant

Acting Chief of Staff of the United States Department of Homeland Security
- In office 2019–2020
- President: Donald Trump

Personal details
- Born: Chad R. Mizelle
- Party: Republican
- Spouse: Kathryn Kimball (m. 2016)
- Education: University of Florida (BA); Cornell University (JD)

Chad Robert Mizelle is an American lawyer who served as chief of staff to the United States Department of Justice in 2025. A member of the Republican Party, he served as the acting chief of staff and later general counsel to the United States Department of Homeland Security from 2019 to 2020.

== Education ==
Mizelle graduated from the University of Florida and earned a Juris Doctor degree from Cornell Law School.

== Career ==
Mizelle worked for the Gibson Dunn law firm before serving in several positions in the First Trump administration, including in the United States Department of Justice and the White House. From 2019 to 2020, he was the acting chief of staff and later general counsel of the United States Department of Homeland Security. During his tenure, Mizelle was involved in developing and defending border security and deportation policies.

Mizelle was hired by the Jones Day law firm in January 2021. Later in 2021, he was appointed by Florida governor Ron DeSantis to serve on the 13th circuit court judicial nominating commission.

Mizelle also served as a commissioner on the Florida Elections Commission starting in 2023.

In December 2024, Mizelle was announced by President Donald Trump as the incoming chief of staff to the United States Department of Justice, with Trump saying that Mizelle would "help bring accountability, integrity, and Justice back to the DOJ."

In September 2025, the DOJ announced that Mizelle would depart from the department early the following month. He officially left the office in October.

== Personal life ==
Mizelle is married to federal judge Kathryn Kimball Mizelle.

Legal offices
Preceded by Adam M. Golodner	Chief of Staff to the United States Department of Justice; 2025–present	Incumbent
