= Carlos E. Mendoza =

American judge (born 1970)

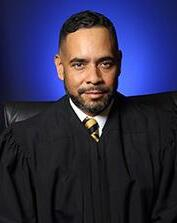

Judge of the United States District Court for the Middle District of Florida
- Incumbent
- Assumed office June 27, 2014
- Appointed by: Barack Obama
- Preceded by: John Antoon

Personal details
- Born: February 18, 1970 (age 56) Hialeah, Florida, U.S.
- Education: Central Florida Community College (AA); West Virginia University (BA, JD)

Military service
- Allegiance: United States
- Branch/service: United States Marine Corps Reserve (1989–1995); United States Navy (1997–2005)
- Rank: Lieutenant
- Unit: United States Navy Judge Advocate General's Corps
- Battles/wars: Operation Desert Shield Operation Desert Storm

Carlos Eduardo Mendoza (born February 18, 1970) is a United States district judge of the United States District Court for the Middle District of Florida and former Florida circuit court judge.

== Biography ==
Mendoza enlisted in the United States Marine Corps after graduation from high school and participated in combat operations during Operation Desert Shield and Operation Desert Storm. He received an Associate of Arts degree in 1991 from Central Florida Community College. He received a Bachelor of Arts degree, magna cum laude, in 1993 from West Virginia University. He received a Juris Doctor in 1997 from the West Virginia University College of Law. He began his legal career by serving as a Judge Advocate in the Judge Advocate General's Corps of the United States Navy from 1997 to 2005. From 2005 to 2008, he was an Assistant State Attorney in the Seventh Judicial Circuit of Florida. From 2008 to 2011, he served as an Assistant City Attorney for St. Augustine, Florida. From 2011 to 2014, he served as a Circuit Court Judge in the Seventh Judicial Circuit.

=== Federal judicial service ===
On February 6, 2014, President Barack Obama nominated Mendoza to serve as a United States District Judge of the United States District Court for the Middle District of Florida, to the seat vacated by Judge John Antoon, who assumed senior status on June 3, 2013. He received a hearing before the United States Senate Judiciary Committee on April 1, 2014. On May 8, 2014, his nomination was reported out of committee by voice vote. On June 19, 2014, Senate Majority Leader Harry Reid filed a motion to invoke cloture on the nomination. On June 23, 2014, the United States Senate invoked cloture on his nomination by a 53–31 vote. On June 24, 2014, his nomination was confirmed by a 94–0 vote. He received his judicial commission on June 27, 2014.

== See also ==
- List of Hispanic and Latino American jurists

Legal offices
Preceded by John Antoon	Judge of the United States District Court for the Middle District of Florida; 2014–present	Incumbent
