= John E. Steele =

American judge (1949–2026)

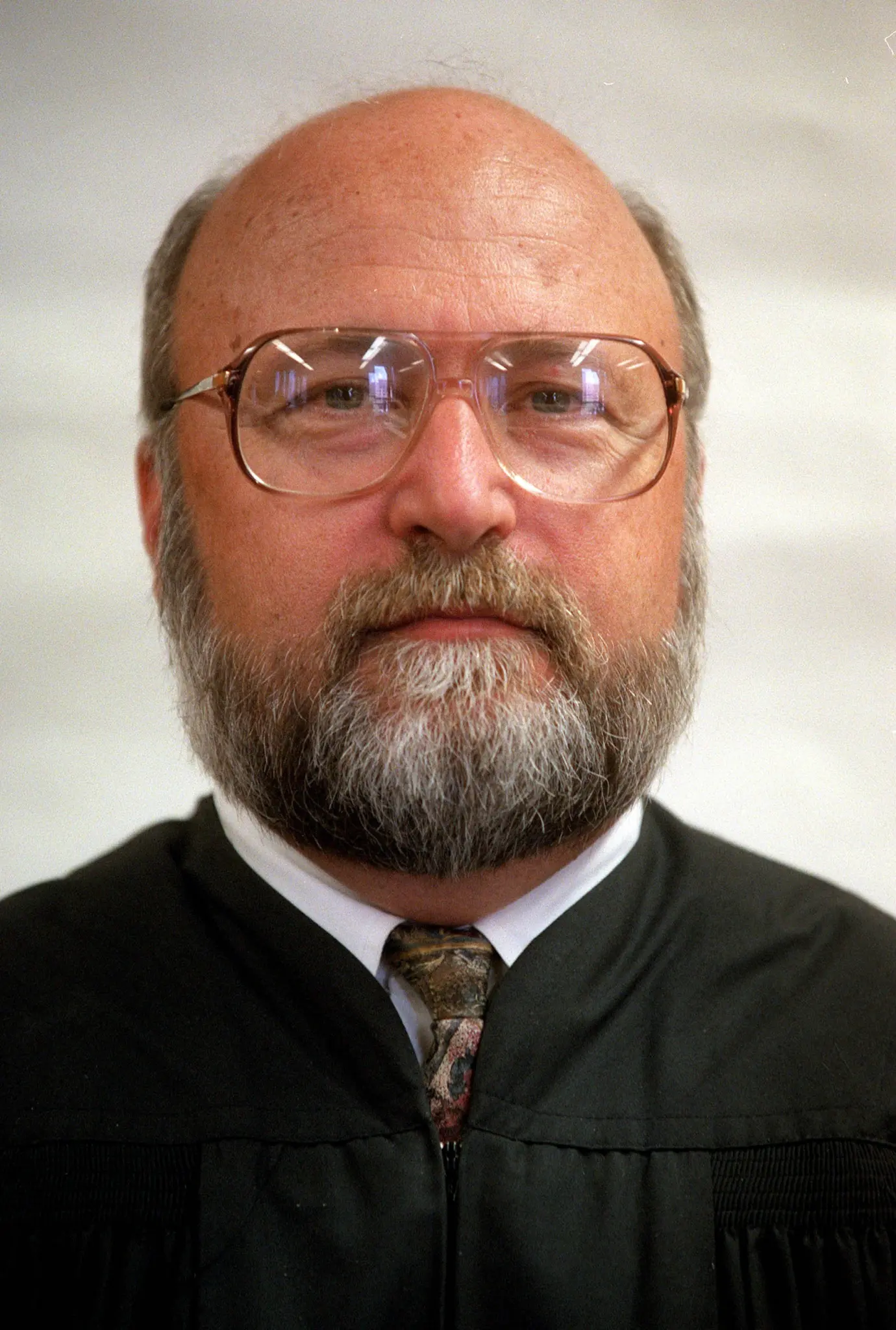
- Steele during his time as a United States magistrate judge

Senior Judge of the United States District Court for the Middle District of Florida
- In office June 3, 2015 – July 14, 2026

Judge of the United States District Court for the Middle District of Florida
- In office July 26, 2000 – June 3, 2015
- Appointed by: Bill Clinton
- Preceded by: Seat established by 113 Stat. 1501
- Succeeded by: Wendy Berger

Magistrate judge of the United States District Court for the Middle District of Florida
- In office 1991–2000

Personal details
- Born: June 3, 1949 Detroit, Michigan, U.S.
- Died: July 14, 2026 (aged 77)
- Education: University of Detroit (B.A., J.D.)

John Edwin "Jay" Steele (June 3, 1949 – July 14, 2026) was a United States district judge of the United States District Court for the Middle District of Florida.

== Early life and education ==
John Edwin Steele was born in Detroit, Michigan on June 3, 1949. He received his Bachelor of Arts degree from the University of Detroit in 1971 and his Juris Doctor from the University of Detroit College of Law in 1973.

== Career ==
Steele served as a law clerk to the Wayne County Prosecuting Attorney's Office in Detroit from 1972 to 1974. He was assistant prosecuting attorney in the Wayne County Prosecuting Attorney's Office from 1974 to 1977 and assistant prosecuting attorney in the Ingham County Prosecutor's Office in Lansing, Michigan from 1977 to 1980. Steele served as an assistant United States attorney in the United States Attorney's Office for the Western District of Michigan from 1980 to 1981. He relocated to Florida and was assistant United States attorney in the United States Attorney for the Middle District of Florida from 1981 to 1988. Steele was in private practice from 1988 to 1991.

=== Federal judicial service ===
Steele served as a United States magistrate judge of the United States District Court for the Middle District of Florida from 1991 to 2000 and was an adjunct professor at Florida Coastal School of Law from 1999 to 2000. President Bill Clinton nominated Steele to the United States District Court for the Middle District of Florida on June 6, 2000, to a new seat created by 113 Stat. 1501. He was confirmed by the Senate on July 21, 2000, and received his commission on July 26, 2000. He assumed senior status on June 3, 2015.

== Death ==
Steele died suddenly on July 14, 2026, at the age of 77.

Legal offices
Preceded by Seat established by 113 Stat. 1501	Judge of the United States District Court for the Middle District of Florida; 2000–2015	Succeeded by Wendy Berger
