= James S. Moody Jr. =

American judge (born 1947)

Senior Judge of the United States District Court for the Middle District of Florida
- Incumbent
- Assumed office March 31, 2014

Judge of the United States District Court for the Middle District of Florida
- In office July 28, 2000 – March 31, 2014
- Appointed by: Bill Clinton
- Preceded by: Seat established by 113 Stat. 1501
- Succeeded by: Paul G. Byron

Judge of the Thirteenth Judicial Circuit Court of Florida
- In office February 3, 1995 – July 28, 2000
- Preceded by: Daniel Perry

Personal details
- Born: James Shelton Moody Jr. March 31, 1947 (age 79) Tampa, Florida, U.S.
- Spouse: Kelli D. Ossi
- Children: 4, including Ashley
- Education: University of Florida (BA, JD)

James Shelton Moody Jr. (born March 31, 1947) is a senior United States district judge of the United States District Court for the Middle District of Florida. Prior to serving on the federal court, he was as a Florida circuit court judge for five years and was a private practice lawyer.

== Education and career ==
Moody was born in Tampa, Florida. He received his Bachelor of Science degree from the University of Florida in 1969 and his Juris Doctor from the Fredric G. Levin College of Law at the University of Florida in 1972. He is a member of Florida Blue Key. From 1969 to 1972, he was a circulation manager for student publications at the University of Florida. Moody was in private practice in Florida from 1972 to 1994. From 1983 to 1994, he served as Director of the Hillsboro SunTrust Bank. From 1993 to 1998, he served as director of the United Way of Hillsborough County. From 1985 to 1997, he served as director of the United Way of East Hillsborough County. From 1982 to 1994, he served as vice president and later director of Moody & Moody, Inc.

In November 1994, Moody ran against Dan Perry in a judicial election. Moody won with 102,694 votes compared to Perry's 97,833 votes. He was elected circuit judge of Florida's Thirteenth Judicial Circuit (Hillsborough County), serving from 1995 to 2000.

=== Federal judicial service ===
President Bill Clinton nominated Moody to the United States District Court for the Middle District of Florida on June 8, 2000, to a new seat created by 113 Stat. 1501. He was confirmed by the Senate on July 21, 2000, and he received his commission on July 28, 2000. He assumed senior status on March 31, 2014.

One notable case that he handled was that of Sami Al-Arian, whom he sentenced to the maximum 57 months in prison and three years of supervised release on May 1, 2006, for aiding a terrorist organization, the Palestine Islamic Jihad.

== Personal life ==
Moody's daughter, Ashley, was elected Attorney General of Florida in the 2018 election and appointed by Gov. Ron DeSantis to fill the United States Senate seat vacated by Marco Rubio in 2025. His son, James S. Moody III, was appointed as a Florida circuit court judge by Gov. DeSantis in 2022.

== Sources ==
- Official profile from the United States District Court for the Middle District of Florida

Legal offices
Preceded by Seat established by 113 Stat. 1501	Judge of the United States District Court for the Middle District of Florida; 2000–2014	Succeeded by Paul G. Byron
