= United States District Court for the Middle District of Florida =

United States federal district court in Florida

Coordinates: 28.5422°N 81.3847°W

- (M.D. Fla.)
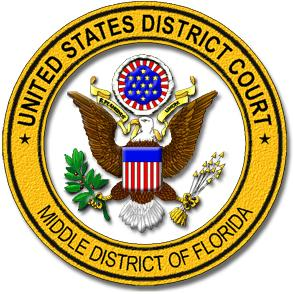
- Location: Orlando More locations: Fort Myers; Bryan Simpson U.S. Courthouse (Jacksonville); Ocala; Tampa
- Appeals to: Eleventh Circuit
- Established: July 30, 1962
- Judges: 15
- Chief Judge: Marcia Morales Howard

Officers of the court
- U.S. Attorney: Gregory Kehoe
- U.S. Marshal: William B. Berger Sr.
- www.flmd.uscourts.gov

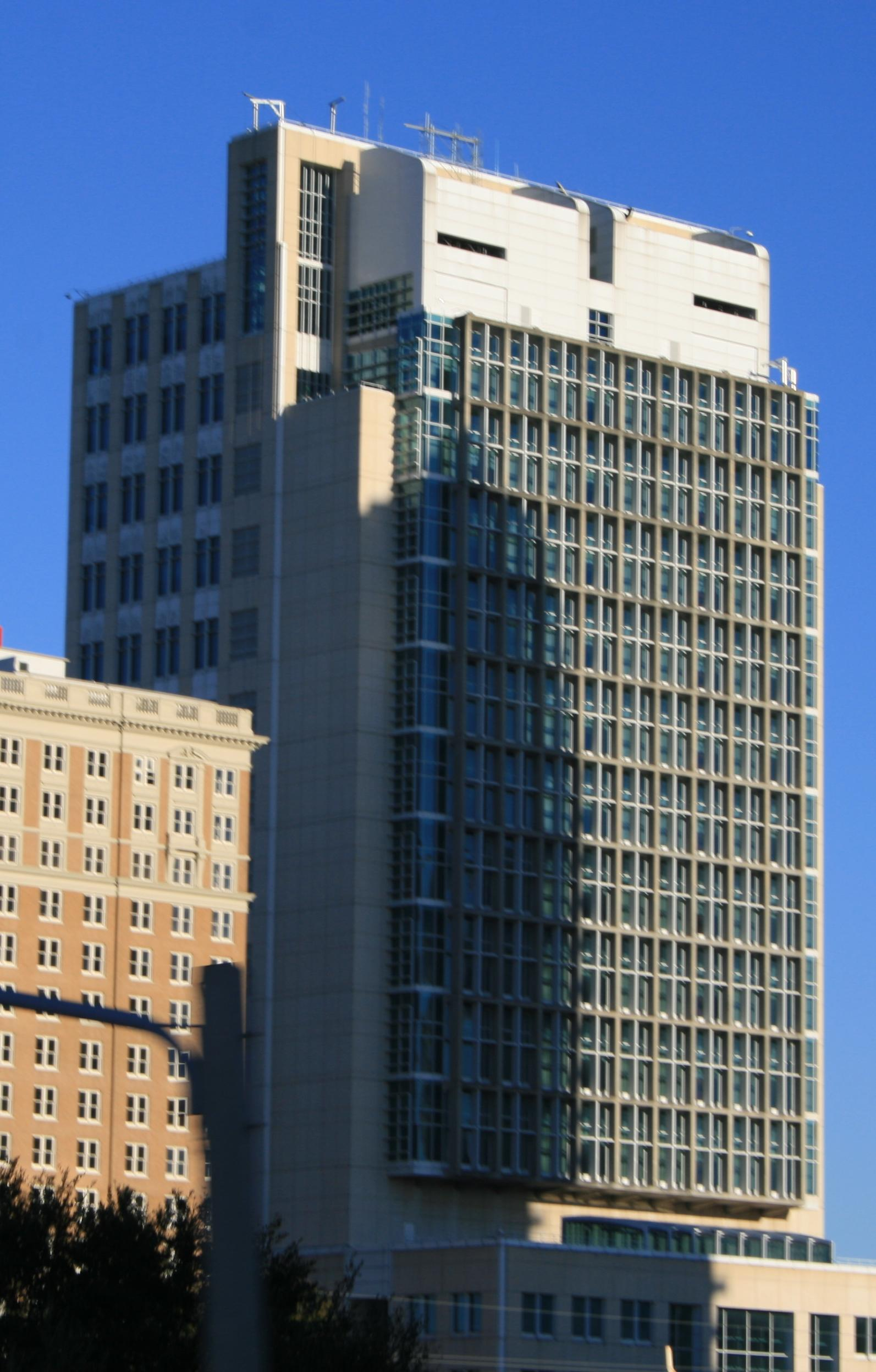
Sam Gibbons Federal Courthouse, Tampa

The United States District Court for the Middle District of Florida (in case citations, M.D. Fla.) is a federal court in the Eleventh Circuit (except for patent claims and claims against the U.S. government under the Tucker Act, which are appealed to the Federal Circuit).

The district was established on July 30, 1962, with parts of the Northern and Southern Districts transferring into the newly created Middle District.

As of March 31, 2025, the United States attorney for the district is Gregory Kehoe.

== Organization of the court ==
The United States District Court for the Middle District of Florida is one of three federal judicial districts in Florida. Court for the District is held at Fort Myers, Jacksonville, Ocala, Orlando, and Tampa.

Fort Myers Division comprises the following counties: Charlotte, Collier, DeSoto, Glades, Hendry, and Lee.

Jacksonville Division comprises the following counties: Baker, Bradford, Clay, Columbia, Duval, Flagler, Hamilton, Nassau, Putnam, St. Johns, Suwannee, and Union.

Ocala Division comprises the following counties: Citrus, Hernando, Lake, Marion, and Sumter.

Orlando Division comprises the following counties: Brevard, Orange, Osceola, Seminole, and Volusia.

Tampa Division comprises the following counties: Hardee, Hillsborough, Manatee, Pasco, Pinellas, Polk, and Sarasota.

== Current judges ==
As of November 3, 2025:

#	Title	Judge	Duty station	Born	Term of service			Appointed by
#	Title	Judge	Duty station	Born	Active	Chief	Senior	Appointed by
32	Chief Judge	Marcia Morales Howard	Jacksonville	1965	2007–present	2024–present	—	G.W. Bush
33	District Judge	Mary Stenson Scriven	Tampa	1962	2008–present	—	—	G.W. Bush
36	District Judge	Sheri Polster Chappell	Ft. Myers	1962	2013–present	—	—	Obama
38	District Judge	Paul G. Byron	Orlando	1959	2014–present	—	—	Obama
39	District Judge	Carlos E. Mendoza	Orlando	1970	2014–present	—	—	Obama
40	District Judge	William F. Jung	Tampa	1958	2018–present	—	—	Trump
41	District Judge	Thomas Barber	Tampa	1966	2019–present	—	—	Trump
42	District Judge	Wendy Berger	Jacksonville	1968	2019–present	—	—	Trump
43	District Judge	John Badalamenti	Tampa	1973	2020–present	—	—	Trump
44	District Judge	Kathryn Kimball Mizelle	Tampa	1987	2020–present	—	—	Trump
45	District Judge	Julie S. Sneed	Orlando	1969	2024–present	—	—	Biden
46	District Judge	Kyle Dudek	Ft. Myers	1985	2025–present	—	—	Trump
47	District Judge	Anne-Leigh Gaylord Moe	Orlando	1979	2025–present	—	—	Trump
48	District Judge	Jordan Pratt	Jacksonville	1987	2025–present	—	—	Trump
49	District Judge	vacant	—	—	—	—	—	—
15	Senior Judge	Elizabeth A. Kovachevich	Tampa	1936	1982–2018	1996–2002	2018–present	Reagan
17	Senior Judge	Patricia C. Fawsett	Orlando	1943	1986–2008	2003–2008	2008–present	Reagan
19	Senior Judge	Harvey E. Schlesinger	Jacksonville	1940	1991–2006	—	2006–present	G.H.W. Bush
20	Senior Judge	Anne C. Conway	Orlando	1950	1991–2015	2008–2015	2015–present	G.H.W. Bush
21	Senior Judge	Steven Douglas Merryday	Tampa	1950	1992–2025	2015–2020	2025–present	G.H.W. Bush
22	Senior Judge	Henry Lee Adams Jr.	Jacksonville	1945	1993–2010	—	2010–present	Clinton
23	Senior Judge	Susan C. Bucklew	Tampa	1942	1993–2008	—	2008–present	Clinton
24	Senior Judge	Richard A. Lazzara	Tampa	1945	1997–2011	—	2011–present	Clinton
25	Senior Judge	James D. Whittemore	Tampa	1952	2000–2017	—	2017–present	Clinton
26	Senior Judge	John Antoon	Orlando	1946	2000–2013	—	2013–present	Clinton
28	Senior Judge	James S. Moody Jr.	Tampa	1947	2000–2014	—	2014–present	Clinton
29	Senior Judge	Gregory A. Presnell	Orlando	1942	2000–2012	—	2012–present	Clinton
30	Senior Judge	Timothy J. Corrigan	Jacksonville	1956	2002–2024	2020–2024	2024–present	G.W. Bush
31	Senior Judge	Virginia Covington	Tampa	1955	2004–2020	—	2020–present	G.W. Bush
34	Senior Judge	Charlene Honeywell	Tampa	1957	2009–2023	—	2023–present	Obama
35	Senior Judge	Roy B. Dalton Jr.	Orlando	1952	2011–2022	—	2022–present	Obama
37	Senior Judge	Brian J. Davis	Jacksonville	1953	2013–2023	—	2023–present	Obama

== Vacancies and pending nominations ==
Seat	Prior judge's duty station	Seat last held by	Vacancy reason	Date of vacancy	Nominee	Date of nomination
15	Jacksonville	Timothy J. Corrigan	Senior status	November 2, 2024	Robert E. Long	September 14, 2026

== Former judges ==
#	Judge	Born–died	Active service	Chief Judge	Senior status	Appointed by	Reason for termination
1	John Simpson	1903–1987	1962–1966 (Note: Reassigned from the Southern District of Florida.)	1962–1966	—	Truman/Operation of law	elevation
2	Joseph Patrick Lieb	1901–1971	1962–1971	1966–1971	—	Eisenhower/Operation of law	death
3	William McRae	1909–1973	1962–1973	1971–1973	—	Kennedy/Operation of law	death
4	George C. Young	1916–2015	1962–1981 (Note: From 1962-1966, Judge Young was jointly appointed to the Middle, Northern, and Southern Districts of Florida.)	1973–1981	1981–2015	Kennedy/Operation of law	death
5	Charles R. Scott	1904–1983	1966–1976	—	1976–1983	L. Johnson	death
6	Ben Krentzman	1914–1998	1967–1982	1981–1982	1982–1998	L. Johnson	death
7	Gerald Bard Tjoflat	1929–present	1970–1975	—	—	Nixon	elevation
8	William Terrell Hodges	1934–2022	1971–1999	1982–1989	1999–2022	Nixon	death
9	John A. Reed Jr.	1931–2015	1973–1984	—	—	Nixon	resignation
10	Howell W. Melton	1923–2015	1977–1991	—	1991–2015	Carter	death
11	George C. Carr	1929–1990	1977–1990	1989–1990	—	Carter	death
12	Susan H. Black	1943–present	1979–1992	1990–1992	—	Carter	elevation
13	William J. Castagna	1924–2020	1979–1992	—	1992–2020	Carter	death
14	John H. Moore II	1929–2013	1981–1995	1992–1995	1995–2013	Reagan	death
16	G. Kendall Sharp	1934–2022	1983–2000	—	2000–2022	Reagan	death
18	Ralph Nimmons Jr.	1938–2003	1991–2003	—	—	G.H.W. Bush	death
27	John E. Steele	1949–2026	2000–2015	—	2015–2026	Clinton	death

== Chief judges ==
Chief judges have administrative responsibilities with respect to their district court. Unlike the Supreme Court, where one justice is specifically nominated to be chief, the office of chief judge rotates among the district court judges. To be chief, a judge must have been in active service on the court for at least one year, be under the age of 65, and have not previously served as chief judge.

A vacancy is filled by the judge highest in seniority among the group of qualified judges. The chief judge serves for a term of seven years, or until age 70, whichever occurs first. The age restrictions are waived if no members of the court would otherwise be qualified for the position.

When the office was created in 1948, the chief judge was the longest-serving judge who had not elected to retire, on what has since 1958 been known as senior status, or declined to serve as chief judge. After August 6, 1959, judges could not become or remain chief after turning 70 years old. The current rules have been in operation since October 1, 1982.

== Succession of seats ==
Seat 1
Reassigned from Southern District on July 30, 1962 by 76 Stat. 247
Simpson	1962–1966
Krentzman, Jr.	1967–1982
Sharp	1983–2000
Antoon II	2000–2013
Mendoza	2014–present

Seat 2
Reassigned from Southern District on July 30, 1962 by 76 Stat. 247
Lieb	1962–1971
Hodges	1971–1999
Whittemore	2000–2017
Barber	2019–present

Seat 3
Reassigned from Southern District on July 30, 1962 by 76 Stat. 247
McRae, Jr.	1962–1973
Reed, Jr.	1973–1984
Fawsett	1986–2008
Scriven	2008–present

Seat 4
Seat assigned on July 30, 1962 by 76 Stat. 247 (concurrent with Northern and Southern Districts)
Seat reassigned solely to Middle District on September 17, 1966 by 80 Stat. 75
Young	1962–1981
Kovachevich	1982–2018
Badalamenti	2020–present

Seat 5
Seat established on March 18, 1966 by 80 Stat. 75
Scott	1966–1976
Carr	1977–1990
Conway	1991–2015
Jung	2018–present

Seat 6
Seat established on June 2, 1970 by 84 Stat. 294
Tjoflat	1970–1975
Melton, Sr.	1977–1991
Schlesinger	1991–2006
Howard	2007–present

Seat 7
Seat established on October 20, 1978 by 92 Stat. 1629
Black	1979–1992
Adams, Jr.	1993–2010
Dalton, Jr.	2011–2022
Sneed	2024–present

Seat 8
Seat established on October 20, 1978 by 92 Stat. 1629
Castagna	1979–1992
Bucklew	1993–2008
Honeywell	2009–2023
Dudek	2025–present

Seat 9
Seat established on October 20, 1978 by 92 Stat. 1629
Moore II	1981–1995
Lazzara	1997–2011
Davis	2013–2023
Moe	2025–present

Seat 10
Seat established on December 1, 1990 by 104 Stat. 5089
Nimmons, Jr.	1991–2003
Covington	2004–2020
Mizelle	2020–present

Seat 11
Seat established on December 1, 1990 by 104 Stat. 5089
Merryday	1992–2025
Pratt	2025–present

Seat 12
Seat established on November 29, 1999 by 113 Stat. 1501
Steele	2000–2015
Berger	2019–present

Seat 13
Seat established on November 29, 1999 by 113 Stat. 1501
Moody, Jr.	2000–2014
Byron	2014–present

Seat 14
Seat established on November 29, 1999 by 113 Stat. 1501
Presnell	2000–2012
Chappell	2013–present

Seat 15
Seat established on November 29, 1999 by 113 Stat. 1501
Corrigan	2002–2024
vacant	2024–present

== Courthouse history ==
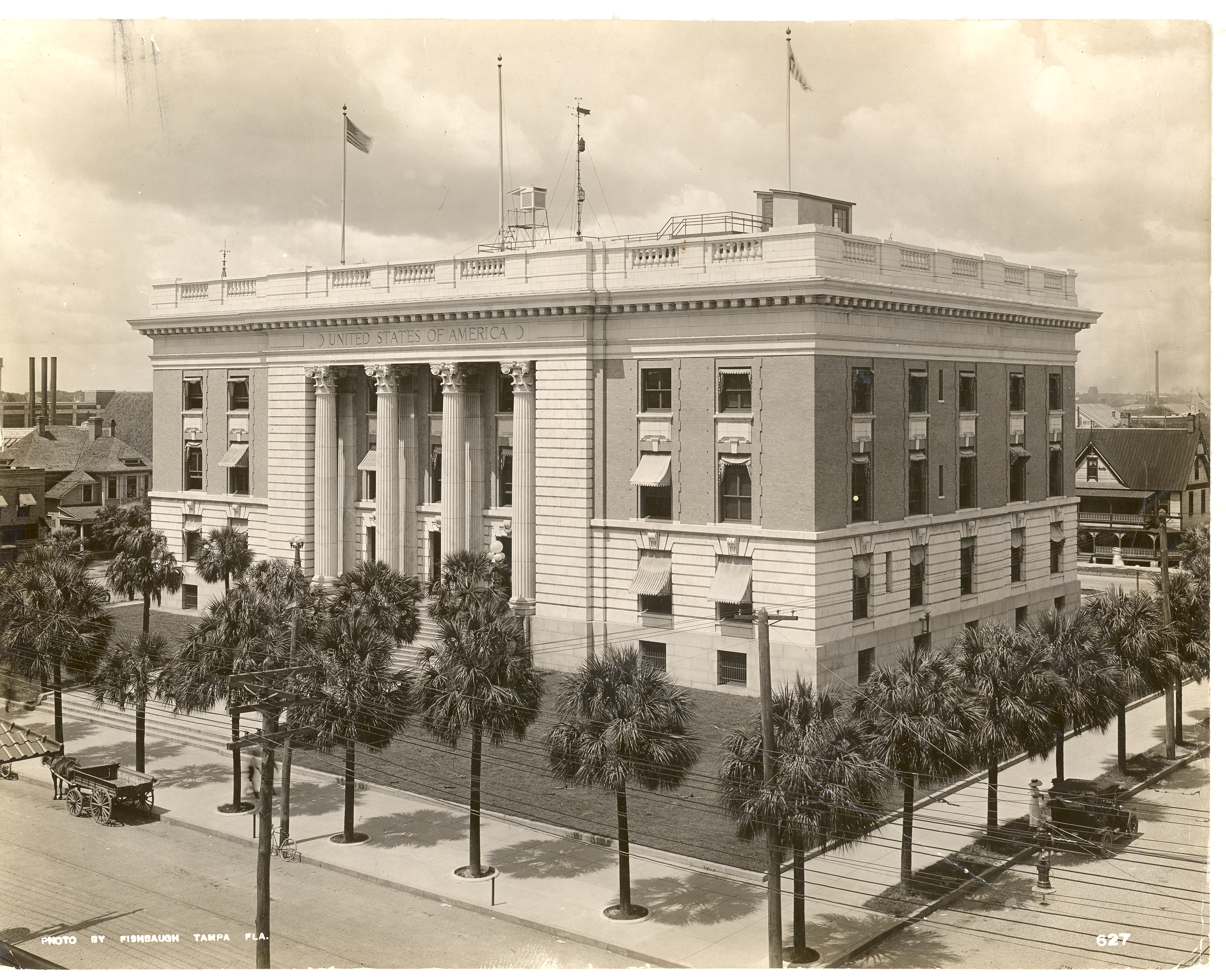
Historic Federal Courthouse in Tampa

Completed in 1908 by architect John Knox Taylor, the historic Federal courthouse in Tampa stands as the only civic building constructed in the eclectic renaissance style. Initially serving as a U.S. Post Office, the courthouse moved two blocks down to its current location in 1998. Congress named the court in honor of long-time Tampa representative and University of Florida Law alumnus Sam Gibbons; the congressman is largely recognized as the founder of the University of South Florida.

== U.S. attorneys ==
- Edward F. Boardman 1961–69
- John L. Briggs 1969–78
- John J. Daley 1978–79
- Gary L. Betz 1979–82
- Robert W. Merkle Jr. 1982–88
- Robert W. Genzman 1988–93
- Douglas N. Frazier 1993
- Larry H. Colleton 1994
- Donna A. Bucella 1994
- Charles R. Wilson 1994–99
- Donna A. Bucella 1999–2001
- Paul Ignatius Perez 2002?–2007
- James R. Klindt 2007
- Robert E. O'Neill 2007–2008
- A. Brian Albritton 2008–2010
- Robert E. O'Neill 2010–2013
- A. Lee Bentley III 2014–2017
- William S. Muldrow 2017
- Maria Chapa Lopez 2018–2021
- Karin Hoppmann 2021
- Roger B. Handberg 2021–2025

== Federal defenders ==
- Robert W. Knight (1977–1983) (office established)
- H. Jay Stevens (1983–1999)
- R. Fletcher Peacock (1999–2007)
- Donna Lee Elm (2007–2021)
- Alec F. Hall (2021–present)

== See also ==
- Courts of Florida
- List of current United States district judges
- List of United States federal courthouses in Florida
- Playboy Enterprises, Inc. v. Frena (1993)
- United States Court of Appeals for the Eleventh Circuit
- United States District Court for the Northern District of Florida
- United States District Court for the Southern District of Florida
- United States attorneys for federal judicial districts of Florida Territory
