= Howell W. Melton =

American judge

Senior Judge of the United States District Court for the Middle District of Florida
- In office February 1, 1991 – December 18, 2015

Judge of the United States District Court for the Middle District of Florida
- In office April 26, 1977 – February 1, 1991
- Appointed by: Jimmy Carter
- Preceded by: Gerald Bard Tjoflat
- Succeeded by: Harvey E. Schlesinger

Personal details
- Born: Howell Webster Melton; December 15, 1923 Atlanta, Georgia
- Died: December 18, 2015 (aged 92) St. Augustine, Florida
- Education: University of Florida (AA); Fredric G. Levin College of Law (JD)

Howell Webster Melton Sr. (December 15, 1923 – December 18, 2015) was an American lawyer and United States district judge of the United States District Court for the Middle District of Florida.

== Education and career ==
Born in Atlanta, Georgia, Melton graduated from the University of Florida in 1943 with his Associate of Arts degree. Melton served in the United States Army from 1943 to 1946 during World War II and attended the Fredric G. Levin College of Law at the University of Florida, receiving his Juris Doctor in 1948. He remained in the United States Army Reserve with the Judge Advocate General's Corps from 1949 to 1953 and became a 1st lieutenant. Melton was in private practice in St. Augustine, Florida from 1948 until 1961. He was a county attorney for St. Johns County from 1959 to 1960. He served as a circuit judge of the 7th Judicial Circuit of Florida from 1961 to 1977.

== Federal judicial service ==
President Jimmy Carter nominated Melton to the United States District Court for the Middle District of Florida on March 29, 1977, to the seat vacated by Judge Gerald Bard Tjoflat. He was confirmed by the United States Senate on April 25, 1977, and received his commission the next day. Melton assumed senior status on February 1, 1991, serving in that status until his death on December 18, 2015, at his St. Augustine home.

== Personal ==
Melton's son, Howell W. Melton Jr., is a retired attorney formerly with Holland & Knight.

== Sources ==
Legal offices
Preceded by Gerald Bard Tjoflat	Judge of the United States District Court for the Middle District of Florida; 1977–1991	Succeeded by Harvey E. Schlesinger
