= Harvey E. Schlesinger =

American judge (born 1940)

Harvey Erwin Schlesinger

Senior Judge of the United States District Court for the Middle District of Florida
- Incumbent
- Assumed office June 5, 2006

Judge of the United States District Court for the Middle District of Florida
- In office July 2, 1991 – June 5, 2006
- Appointed by: George H. W. Bush
- Preceded by: Howell W. Melton
- Succeeded by: Marcia Morales Howard

Magistrate Judge of the United States District Court for the Middle District of Florida
- In office 1975–1991

Personal details
- Born: Harvey Erwin Schlesinger; June 4, 1940 (age 85) New York City, New York, U.S.
- Education: The Citadel (BA); University of Richmond School of Law (JD)

Harvey Erwin Schlesinger (born June 4, 1940) is a senior United States district judge of the United States District Court for the Middle District of Florida.

== Education and career ==
Schlesinger was born in 1940 in New York City, New York. He graduated from James Madison High School in Brooklyn in 1958. He received his Bachelor of Arts degree from The Citadel in 1962 and his Juris Doctor from the University of Richmond T.C. Williams School of Law in 1965. Schlesinger served in the United States Army from 1965 to 1968, attaining the rank of captain. Schlesinger was an instructor at John Marshall Law School in Atlanta, Georgia from 1967 to 1968 and corporate counsel for Seaboard Coast Line Railroad in Jacksonville, Florida from 1968 to 1970. Schlesinger was the Chief Assistant United States Attorney for the Middle District of Florida from 1970 to 1975. He served as a United States magistrate judge of the United States District Court for the Middle District of Florida from 1975 to 1991, and as an adjunct professor at the University of North Florida from 1984 to 1992.

== Federal judicial service ==
President George H. W. Bush nominated Schlesinger on May 23, 1991 to the United States District Court for the Middle District of Florida, to the seat vacated by Judge Howell W. Melton. Confirmed by the Senate on June 27, 1991, he received commission on July 2, 1991. Schlesinger assumed senior status on June 5, 2006.

== See also ==
- List of Jewish American jurists

== Sources ==
Legal offices
Preceded by Howell W. Melton	Judge of the United States District Court for the Middle District of Florida; 1991–2006	Succeeded by Marcia Morales Howard
