= Charles O. Andrews Jr. =

American politician (1910–1969)

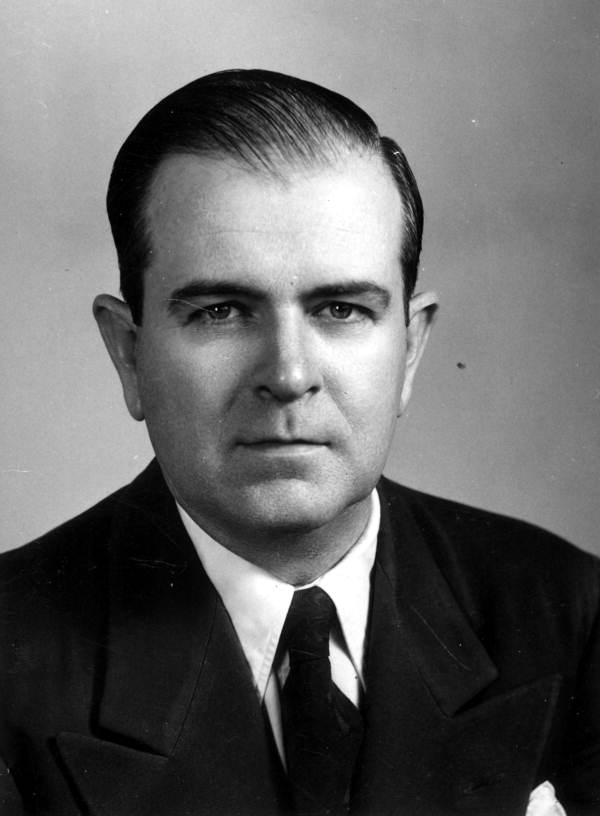
- Andrews in 1949

Member of the Florida House of Representatives from Orange County
- In office 1949–1953 Serving with Burton Thornal; Edward R. Kirkland
- Preceded by: Alex Akerman Jr. Needham Tyndale Cobb Jr.
- Succeeded by: James E. Keezel; Henry W. Land

Personal details
- Born: October 11, 1910 Tallahassee, Florida, U.S.
- Died: September 18, 1969 (aged 58) Orlando, Florida, U.S.
- Party: Democratic
- Spouse: Mathilde Mizener
- Parent: Charles O. Andrews (father)

Charles Oscar Andrews Jr. (October 11, 1910 – September 18, 1969) was an American politician.

== Life and career ==
Charles Oscar Andrews Jr. was born in Tallahassee, Florida on October 11, 1910, the son of longtime Florida politician Charles O. Andrews.

In 1949, Andrews was elected as a Democrat to the Florida House of Representatives. In 1953, he left office, later serving as a judge of Florida's Second District Appellate Court.

Andrews died in Orlando on September 18, 1969, at the age of 58.
