= 2001 Major League Baseball draft =

Major League Baseball draft

General information
- Date: June 5–6, 2001
- Location: New York, New York

Overview
- First selection: Joe Mauer; Minnesota Twins
- Hall of Famers: 1: C Joe Mauer

The 2001 Major League Baseball draft, was held on June 5 and 6.

== First round selections ==
= All-Star	= Hall of Fame

Pick	Player	Team	Position	School
1	Joe Mauer	Minnesota Twins	C	Cretin-Derham Hall High School (MN)
2	Mark Prior	Chicago Cubs	RHP	USC
3	Dewon Brazelton	Tampa Bay Devil Rays	RHP	Middle Tennessee
4	Gavin Floyd	Philadelphia Phillies	RHP	Mount Saint Joseph High School (MD)
5	Mark Teixeira	Texas Rangers	3B	Georgia Tech
6	Josh Karp	Montreal Expos	RHP	California
7	Chris Smith	Baltimore Orioles	LHP	Cumberland
8	John Van Benschoten	Pittsburgh Pirates	RHP	Kent State
9	Colt Griffin	Kansas City Royals	RHP	Marshall High School (TX)
10	Chris Burke	Houston Astros	SS	Tennessee
11	Kenny Baugh	Detroit Tigers	RHP	Rice
12	Mike Jones	Milwaukee Brewers	RHP	Thunderbird High School (AZ)
13	Casey Kotchman	Anaheim Angels	1B	Seminole High School (FL)
14	Jake Gautreau	San Diego Padres	1B-3B	Tulane
15	Gabe Gross	Toronto Blue Jays	LF	Auburn
16	Kris Honel	Chicago White Sox (Note: Pick from Florida Marlins as compensation for signing of free agent Charles Johnson)	RHP	Providence Catholic High School (IL)
17	Dan Denham	Cleveland Indians (Note: Pick from Boston Red Sox as compensation for signing of free agent Manny Ramirez)	RHP	Deer Valley High School (CA)
18	Aaron Heilman	New York Mets (Note: Pick from Colorado Rockies as compensation for signing of free agent Mike Hampton)	RHP	Notre Dame
19	Mike Fontenot	Baltimore Orioles (Note: Pick from New York Yankees as compensation for signing of free agent Mike Mussina)	2B	LSU
20	Jeremy Sowers	Cincinnati Reds	LHP	Ballard High School (KY)
21	Brad Hennessey	San Francisco Giants (Note: Pick from Cleveland Indians as compensation for signing of free agent Ellis Burks)	RHP	Youngstown State
22	Jason Bulger	Arizona Diamondbacks	RHP	Valdosta State
23	John-Ford Griffin	New York Yankees (Note: Pick from Seattle Mariners as compensation for signing of free agent Jeff Nelson)	RF	Florida State
24	Macay McBride	Atlanta Braves (Note: Pick from Los Angeles Dodgers as compensation for signing of free agent Andy Ashby)	LHP	Screven County High School (GA)
25	Bobby Crosby	Oakland Athletics	SS	Long Beach State
26	Jeremy Bonderman	Oakland Athletics (Note: Pick from New York Mets as compensation for signing of free agent Kevin Appier)	RHP	Pasco High School (WA)
27	William Horne	Cleveland Indians (Note: Pick from Chicago White Sox as compensation for signing of free agent Sandy Alomar Jr.)	RHP	Marianna High School (FL)
28	Justin Pope	St. Louis Cardinals	RHP	UCF
29	Josh Burrus	Atlanta Braves	SS	Wheeler High School (GA)
30	Noah Lowry	San Francisco Giants	LHP	Pepperdine

== Supplemental first round selections ==
Pick	Player	Team	Position	School
31	Bryan Bass	Baltimore Orioles (Note: Supplemental pick for loss of free agent Mike Mussina)	SS	Seminole High School (FL)
32	Michael Woods	Detroit Tigers (Note: Supplemental pick for loss of free agent Juan González)	2B	Southern
33	Jeff Mathis	Anaheim Angels (Note: Supplemental pick for loss of free agent Mark Petkovsek)	C	Marianna High School (FL)
34	Bronson Sardinha	New York Yankees (Note: Supplemental pick for loss of free agent Denny Neagle)	SS	Kamehameha High School (HI)
35	J. D. Martin	Cleveland Indians (Note: Supplemental pick for loss of free agent Manny Ramirez)	RHP	Sherman E. Burroughs High School (CA)
36	Michael Garciaparra	Seattle Mariners (Note: Supplemental pick for loss of free agent Alex Rodriguez)	SS	Don Bosco Technical Institute
37	John Rheinecker	Oakland Athletics (Note: Supplemental pick for loss of free agent Kevin Appier)	LHP	Southwest Missouri State
38	David Wright	New York Mets (Note: Supplemental pick for loss of free agent Mike Hampton)	3B	Hickory High School (VA)
39	Wyatt Allen	Chicago White Sox (Note: Supplemental pick for loss of free agent Charles Johnson)	RHP	Tennessee
40	Richard Lewis	Atlanta Braves (Note: Supplemental pick for loss of free agent Andy Ashby)	2B	Georgia Tech
41	Todd Linden	San Francisco Giants (Note: Supplemental pick for loss of free agent Ellis Burks)	OF	LSU
42	Jon Skaggs	New York Yankees (Note: Supplemental pick for loss of free agent Jeff Nelson)	RHP	Rice
43	Mike Conroy	Cleveland Indians (Note: Supplemental pick for loss of free agent David Segui)	OF	Boston College High School (MA)
44	Jayson Nix	Colorado Rockies (Note: Supplemental pick for failure to sign 2000 No.1 choice Matt Harrington)	SS	Midland High School (TX)

== Background ==
On June 1, 2001, Rolando Viera, a Cuban baseball pitcher who had recently left Cuba, attempted to enjoin Major League Baseball from including him in the 2001 draft so that he could instead sign as a free agent. Viera, represented by attorney Alan Gura and agent Joe Kehoskie, claimed that the MLB draft was discriminatory because it had different signing rules for Cubans than for other foreign players. On June 4, federal judge James D. Whittemore ruled that whatever financial loss Viera suffered from being subject to the draft did not satisfy the federal injunction requirement of irreparable harm. Viera was picked by the Boston Red Sox that same week in the seventh round of the draft.

The Minnesota Twins selected St. Paul, MN native Joe Mauer with the number one pick in the 2001 draft. The 18-year-old Mauer, a catcher from Cretin-Derham Hall High School in St. Paul, became the seventh Minnesotan to be selected in the first round and the first to be chosen number one overall. The back-stop was a member of the USA Junior National Team and won a gold medal at the world tournament in Taiwan in 1999. He was also a High School football standout as a quarterback and signed a letter of intent to play football at Florida State University before being drafted.

Right-handed pitcher Mark Prior of the University of Southern California was selected by the Chicago Cubs with the second overall pick in the draft. Prior, who was previously selected in the supplemental first round of the 1998 draft by the Yankees, was the first college player chosen in the 2001 draft. Prior won numerous National Player of the Year awards after going 15–1 with a 1.69 ERA and 202 strikeouts to lead the Trojans to a College World Series berth in his junior year.

== Other notable players ==
- Kelly Shoppach, 2nd round, 48th overall by the Boston Red Sox
- J. J. Hardy, 2nd round, 56th overall by the Milwaukee Brewers
- Brandon League, 2nd round, 59th overall by the Toronto Blue Jays
- Dan Haren, 2nd round, 72nd overall by the St. Louis Cardinals
- Ryan Theriot, 3rd round, 78th overall by the Chicago Cubs
- Scott Hairston, 3rd round, 98th overall by the Arizona Diamondbacks
- Ricky Nolasco, 4th round, 108th overall by the Chicago Cubs
- Jeff Keppinger, 4th round, 114th overall by the Pittsburgh Pirates
- Josh Barfield, 4th round, 120th overall by the San Diego Padres
- Kyle Davies, 4th round, 135th overall by the Atlanta Braves
- Brendan Harris, 5th round, 138th overall by the Chicago Cubs
- Ryan Howard, 5th round, 140th overall by the Philadelphia Phillies
- C.J. Wilson, 5th round, 141st overall by the Texas Rangers
- Jim Johnson, 5th round, 143rd overall by the Baltimore Orioles
- Ryan Raburn, 5th round, 147th overall by the Detroit Tigers
- Skip Schumaker, 5th round, 164th overall by the St. Louis Cardinals
- Edwin Jackson, 6th round, 190th overall by the Los Angeles Dodgers
- Chad Tracy, 7th round, 218th overall by the Arizona Diamondbacks
- Dan Johnson, 7th round, 221st overall by the Oakland Athletics
- Kevin Youkilis, 8th round, 243rd overall by the Boston Red Sox
- Luke Scott, 9th round, 277th overall by the Cleveland Indians
- Michael Wood, 10th round, 311th overall by the Oakland Athletics
- Geovany Soto, 11th round, 318th overall by the Chicago Cubs
- Dan Uggla, 11th round, 338th overall by the Arizona Diamondbacks
- Jason Bartlett, 13th round, 390th overall by the San Diego Padres
- Chris Young, 16th round, 493rd overall by the Chicago White Sox
- Jonny Gomes, 18th round, 529th overall by the Tampa Bay Devil Rays
- Zach Duke, 20th round, 604th overall by the Pittsburgh Pirates
- Jake Mauer, 23rd round, 677th overall by the Minnesota Twins
- Matt Albers, 23rd round, 686th overall by the Houston Astros
- Kevin Correia, 23rd round, 704th overall by the St. Louis Cardinals
- Charlie Haeger, 25th round, 763rd overall by the Chicago White Sox
- Manny Parra, 26th round, 778th overall by the Milwaukee Brewers
- Nick Blackburn, 29th round, 857th overall by the Minnesota Twins
- Joey Gathright, 32nd round, 949th overall by the Tampa Bay Devil Rays
- Chad Gaudin, 34th round, 1009th overall by the Tampa Bay Devil Rays
- Rajai Davis, 38th round, 1134th overall by the Pittsburgh Pirates

=== NFL players drafted ===
- Quan Cosby, 6th round, 179th overall by the Anaheim Angels
- Cedric Benson, 12th round, 370th overall by the Los Angeles Dodgers
- Matt Ware, 21st round, 639th overall by the Seattle Mariners
- Brandon Jones, 28th round, 845th overall by the New York Yankees, but did not sign
- Brooks Bollinger, 50th round, 1480th overall by the Los Angeles Dodgers, but did not sign

Preceded by Adrián González	1st Overall Picks; Joe Mauer	Succeeded by Bryan Bullington
