= Anne C. Conway =

American judge (born 1950)

Judge of the United States Foreign Intelligence Surveillance Court
- In office May 19, 2016 – May 18, 2023
- Appointed by: John Roberts
- Preceded by: Susan Webber Wright
- Succeeded by: Timothy D. DeGiusti

Senior Judge of the United States District Court for the Middle District of Florida
- Incumbent
- Assumed office August 1, 2015

Chief Judge of the United States District Court for the Middle District of Florida
- In office August 25, 2008 – August 1, 2015
- Preceded by: Patricia C. Fawsett
- Succeeded by: Steven Douglas Merryday

Judge of the United States District Court for the Middle District of Florida
- In office November 25, 1991 – August 1, 2015
- Appointed by: George H. W. Bush
- Preceded by: George C. Carr
- Succeeded by: William F. Jung

Personal details
- Born: July 30, 1950 (age 75) Cleveland, Ohio, U.S.
- Education: John Carroll University (BA); University of Florida (JD

Anne C. Conway (born July 30, 1950) is an American lawyer who serves as a senior United States district judge of the United States District Court for the Middle District of Florida. She is a former judge of the United States Foreign Intelligence Surveillance Court.

== Education and career ==
Conway was born in Cleveland, Ohio. She received her Bachelor of Arts degree from John Carroll University in 1972 and her Juris Doctor from the University of Florida College of Law in 1975. At UF Law she was executive editor of Florida Law Review and interned with Legal Aid. After graduating law school, Conway was a law clerk to Judge John A. Reed Jr. of the United States District Court for the Middle District of Florida, serving from 1975 to 1977. She was in private practice in Orlando, Florida from 1978 to 1991. She joining the firm of Young, Turnbull & Linscott before moving to Wells, Gattis & Hallowes a year later. She was made a partner at Wells, Gattis & Hallowes in 1981. In 1982, Conway began practicing with Carlton Fields.

=== Federal judicial service ===
President George H. W. Bush nominated Conway to the United States District Court for the Middle District of Florida on July 24, 1991, to the seat vacated by Judge George C. Carr. She was confirmed by the United States Senate on November 21, 1991, and received her commission on November 25, 1991. She served as chief judge from 2008 to 2015. She assumed senior status on August 1, 2015. She is stationed at the Orlando Division of the court.

In April 2016 Chief Justice John Roberts appointed Conway to the United States Foreign Intelligence Surveillance Court for a term starting May 19, 2016.

Judge Conway approved a 2017 FISA Court warrant for Carter Page, a former adviser to the 2016 Trump Campaign. The warrant application was released publicly in July 2018, marking the first time FISA warrant application materials were made public. The heavily-redacted, 412-page application cites many sources, including confidential informants. Among those many sources, the application cites the Steele dossier, leading former assistant U.S. attorney and legal commentator Andrew C. McCarthy to write, in reference to the fact that the renewal submission contained unverified allegations, an idea he had previously considered "crazy" ("It turns out, however, that the crazies were right and I was wrong,") that "the newly disclosed FISA applications are so shoddy that the judges who approved them ought to be asked some hard questions," and "what happened here flouts rudimentary investigative standards."

== Other service ==
Conway serves on the board of advisers for the Center for Governmental Responsibility at the University of Florida.

Legal offices
| Preceded by George C. Carr | Judge of the United States District Court for the Middle District of Florida; 1991–2015 | Succeeded by William F. Jung |
| Preceded by Patricia C. Fawsett | Chief Judge of the United States District Court for the Middle District of Florida; 2008–2015 | Succeeded by Steven Douglas Merryday |
| Preceded by Susan Webber Wright | Judge of the United States Foreign Intelligence Surveillance Court; 2016–2023 | Succeeded by Timothy D. DeGiusti |
