= Thomas Barber (judge) =

American judge (born 1966)

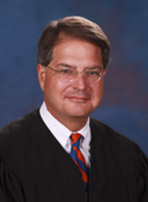

Judge of the United States District Court for the Middle District of Florida
- Incumbent
- Assumed office July 11, 2019
- Appointed by: Donald Trump
- Preceded by: James D. Whittemore

Judge of the Thirteenth Judicial Circuit Court of Florida
- In office 2008 – July 11, 2019
- Appointed by: Charlie Crist
- Succeeded by: Jared Smith

Judge of the Hillsborough County Court
- In office 2004–2008
- Appointed by: Jeb Bush

Personal details
- Born: Thomas Patrick Barber; December 1, 1966 (age 59) Pittsburgh, Pennsylvania, U.S.
- Education: University of Florida (BA); University of Pennsylvania (JD)

Thomas Patrick Barber (born December 1, 1966) is a United States district judge of the United States District Court for the Middle District of Florida.

== Education and legal career ==
Barber was born on December 1, 1966, in Pittsburgh, Pennsylvania. He earned his Bachelor of Arts from the University of Florida, where he was inducted into Phi Beta Kappa, and his Juris Doctor from the University of Pennsylvania Law School. After graduating law school, he practiced for five years in the trial and business litigation department of Carlton Fields in Tampa. He then served as an Assistant Statewide Prosecutor in the Office of Statewide Prosecution and as an Assistant State Attorney for the Thirteenth Judicial Circuit. Upon completion of his service as a prosecutor he returned to Carlton Fields, P.A., where his practice focused on business litigation until his appointment to the bench.

== State court service ==
In 2004, Florida Governor Jeb Bush appointed Barber to the Hillsborough County Circuit Court. Barber was elevated to the Thirteenth Judicial Circuit Court of Florida by Charlie Crist in 2008. He was re-elected to a six-year term in 2016, but his state court service ended when he was commissioned as a federal judge.

== Federal judicial service ==
On April 26, 2018, President Donald Trump announced his intent to nominate Barber to serve as a United States District Judge of the United States District Court for the Middle District of Florida. On May 7, 2018, his nomination was sent to the Senate. He was nominated to the seat vacated by Judge James D. Whittemore, who assumed senior status on August 29, 2017. On October 17, 2018, a hearing on his nomination was held before the Senate Judiciary Committee.

On January 3, 2019, his nomination was returned to the President under Rule XXXI, Paragraph 6 of the United States Senate. On January 23, 2019, President Trump announced his intent to renominate Barber for a federal judgeship. His nomination was sent to the Senate later that day. On February 7, 2019, his nomination was reported out of committee by a 20–2 vote. On June 11, 2019, the Senate invoked cloture on his nomination by a 75–21 vote. On June 12, 2019, his nomination was confirmed by a 77–19 vote. He received his judicial commission on July 11, 2019.

=== Notable cases ===
In 2021, Barber sentenced Christopher Buonocore, a cyberstalker who shared nude photos of women without their consent, to 15 years in prison.

In 2023, U.S. District Judge Tom Barber of the United States District Court for the Middle District of Florida presided over a civil lawsuit filed by three former Church of Scientology members alleging human trafficking, abuse, and coercive control within the church's Sea Organization. Judge Barber ruled that the plaintiffs’ claims could not be adjudicated in federal court because the parties had entered into agreements requiring disputes to be resolved through internal religious arbitration. He held that deciding issues about the enforceability of those arbitration agreements would require the court to interpret religious doctrine, which is prohibited by the First Amendment, and thus compelled the parties into arbitration rather than allowing the claims to proceed in court.

Legal offices
Preceded by James D. Whittemore	Judge of the United States District Court for the Middle District of Florida; 2019–present	Incumbent
