= Edward R. Kirkland =

American politician (1923–2012)

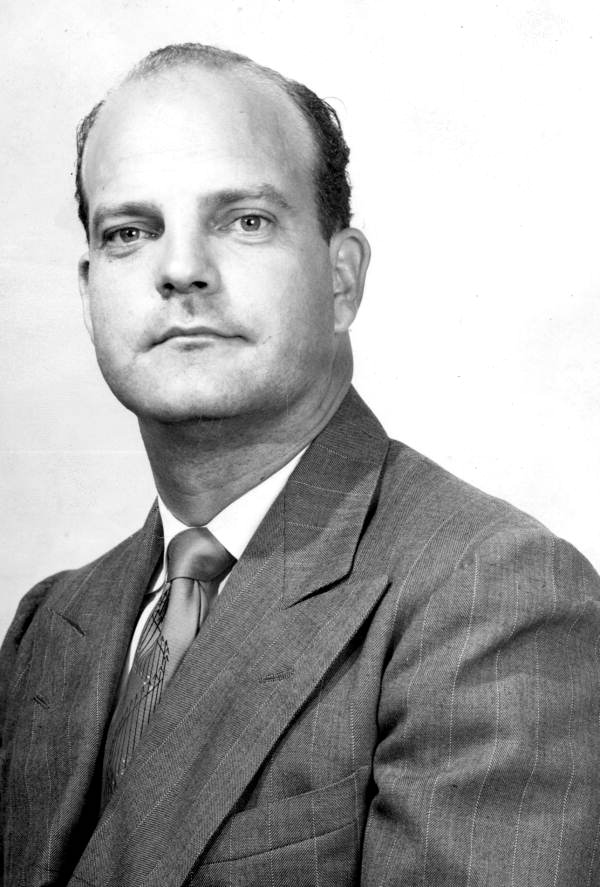
- Kirkland in 1951

Member of the Florida House of Representatives from Orange County
- In office 1951–1953 Serving with Charles O. Andrews Jr.
- Preceded by: Burton Thornal

Personal details
- Born: Edward Romph Kirkland; March 16, 1923 Coral Gables, Florida, U.S.
- Died: November 26, 2012 (aged 89) Winter Park, Florida, U.S.
- Party: Democratic
- Education: University of Miami; Stetson University

Edward Romph Kirkland (March 16, 1923 – November 26, 2012) was an American attorney and politician. He served as a Democratic member of the Florida House of Representatives from 1951 to 1953.

Kirkland was born in Coral Gables, Florida, the son of Ruby and George Kirkland. Kirkland served as a flight instructor and fighter pilot for the United States Army Air Force during World War II. In March 1945 Kirkland was shot down over Germany and captured by an enemy patrol, but managed to escape and return to his unit.

After the war Kirkland attended the University of Miami and Stetson University, where he earned his law degree. In 1951, he was elected to the Florida House of Representatives. After one term, he left office in 1953. He returned to his practice as a criminal defence lawyer, which included successfully arguing a case before the Supreme Court in 1968.

== Death and legacy ==
Kirkland died in November 2012 at Winter Park Memorial Hospital in Winter Park, Florida, at the age of 89.

An accomplished golfer, he was inducted into the Stetson University Sports Hall of Fame in 1981.
