= St. Thomas University College of Law =

Graduate school in Miami Gardens, Florida

Coordinates: 25.9210°N 80.2535°W

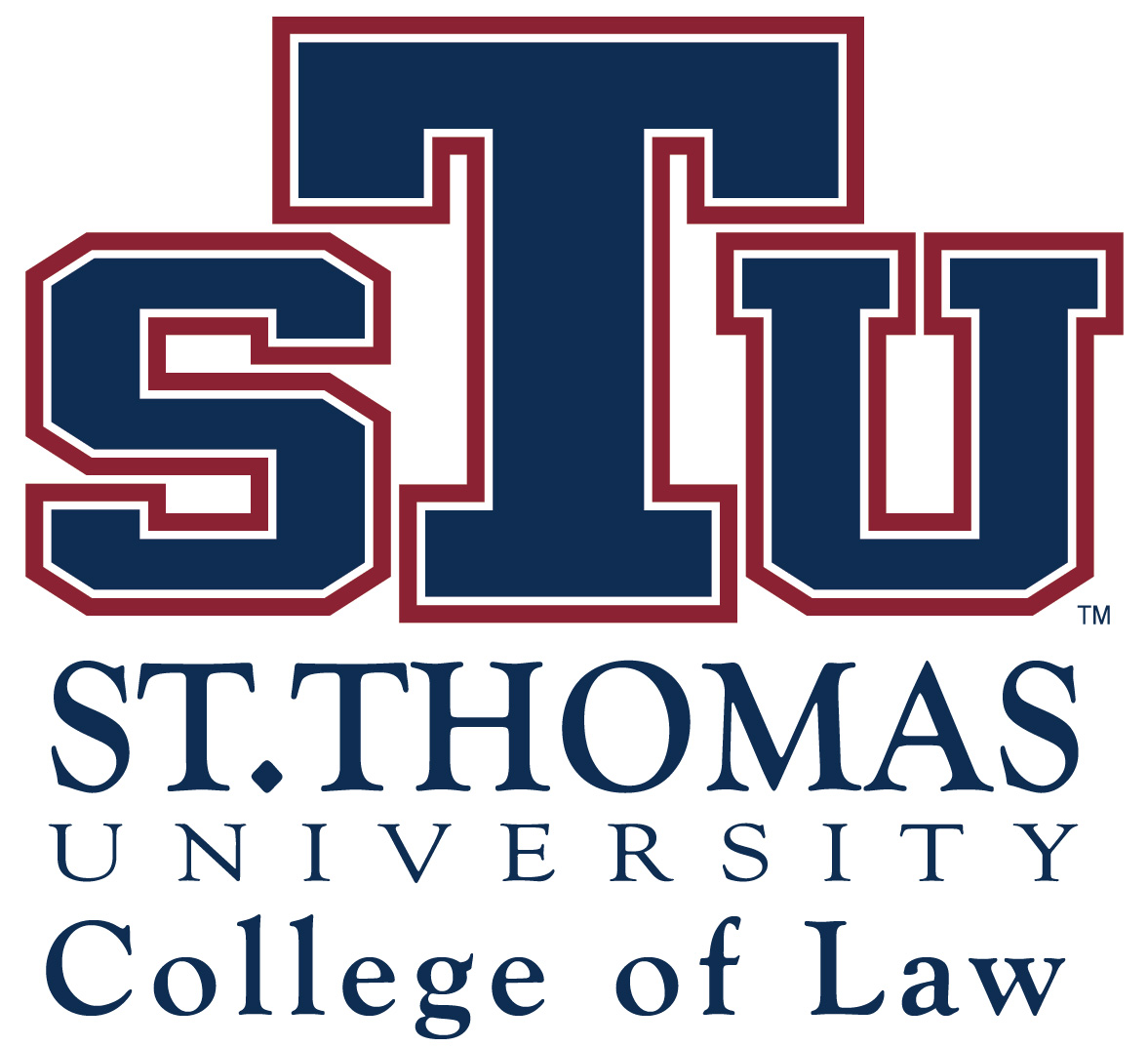
- Established: 1984; 42 years ago
- School type: Private law school
- Parent endowment: $23.4 Million
- Dean: Tarlika Nunez-Navarro
- Location: Miami Gardens, Florida, US
- Enrollment: 758
- Faculty: 34 full-time; 48 part-time adjunct (Spring 2023)
- USNWR ranking: 178-195 (2025)
- Bar pass rate: 72.41% (Florida bar exam, 2024 first-time takers); 80.89% (2024 first–time takers all jurisdictions); 87.68% (Two year pass rate class of 2022)
- Website: law school homepage

The St. Thomas University College of Law is the law school of St. Thomas University located in Miami Gardens, Florida. The College of Law was founded in 1984. According to its 2024 ABA-required disclosures, 62.9% of the Class of 2023 obtained full-time, bar-passage-required employment (i.e. as attorneys) after graduation. In 2025, Benjamin L. Crump and St. Thomas University announced a mutual and forward-looking decision transitioning the name from Benjamin L. Crump College of Law back to St. Thomas University College of Law.

== Diversity ==
In 2023, U.S. News & World Report reported that the law school was the sixth most ethnically and racially diverse ABA-accredited law school. The former dean, Alfredo Garcia, was the first Cuban-born dean of a U.S. law school. The current dean is Tarlika Nunez-Navarro who became dean in August 2023.

== Programs ==
The faculties of the law school and the university's graduate school offer five joint degree programs: the J.D./M.S. in Sports Administration, the J.D./M.B.A. in Sports Administration, the J.D./M.S. in Marriage and Family Counseling, J.D./M.B.A. in International Business, and the J.D./M.B.A. in Accounting. The school has two L.L.M graduate programs, one in cybersecurity and one in intercultural human rights.

== Admissions ==
For the class entering in 2024, the law school accepted 913 out of 1505 applicants, a 60.66% acceptance rate, with 390 of those accepted enrolling, a 42.72% yield rate (the percentage of accepted students who enrolled). The median LSAT score was 152 and the median undergraduate GPA was 3.30. Two students were not included in the GPA calculation. Its 25th/75th percentile LSAT scores and GPAs were 149/155 and 2.98/3.58.

== Ranking ==
In 2025, U.S. News & World Report ranked the law school tied for No. 178-195 out of 197 ABA accredited law schools (bottom 9.64% at most).

== Employment ==
62.9% of the Class of 2023 obtained full-time, long-term, JD-required employment (i.e. as attorneys) nine months after graduation, excluding solo practitioners. St. Thomas University College of Law's Law School Transparency under-employment score is 30.3%, indicating the percentage of the Class of 2023 unemployed, underemployed, pursuing an additional degree, or working in a non-professional, short-term, or part-time job nine months after graduation. Most graduates employed as attorneys were employed in small regional firms.

== Bar examination passage ==
The bar examination passage rate for the law school’s first-time examination takers was 72.41% for the Florida bar exam in 2024 and 80.89% for all jurisdictions for 2024. The Ultimate Bar Pass Rate, which the ABA defines as the passage rate for graduates who sat for bar examinations within two years of graduating, was 87.68% for the class of 2022.

== Costs ==
The Law School Transparency estimated debt-financed cost of attendance for three years is $233,742. Yearly tuition and fees for J.D. students is $44,830 (2021–2022).

== Publications ==
The law school has two publications:

- St. Thomas Law Review
- Intercultural Human Rights Law Review

== Notable alumni ==
- Jose Baez (JD, 1997) - defense attorney in the Casey Anthony trial
- Gaston Cantens (JD, 1992) - vice president of Florida Crystals sugar company and former member of the Florida House of Representatives (1998–2004)
- Ana Navarro (JD, 1997) - Nicaraguan-American Republican political commentator and co–host of The View
- Juan-Carlos Planas (JD, 1998) - former member of the Florida House of Representatives (2002–2010)
- Isaac Wright Jr. (JD, 2007) - defense attorney who secured his own release and exoneration from the conviction as a drug lord
- Cord Byrd (JD, 1997) - Republican secretary of state of Florida
- Sheila Cherfilus-McCormick (JD, 2010) – U.S. representative for Florida's 20th congressional district who has been indicted on 17 counts of theft of $5 million in FEMA funds, money laundering, and making illegal campaign contributions, and if convicted, facing up to 53 years in prison
- Ricky K. Patel (JD, 2009) - American lawyer and philanthropist serving as of counsel with Akerman LLP in Miami
