= Mary Stenson Scriven =

American judge (born 1962)

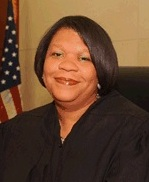

Judge of the United States District Court for the Middle District of Florida
- Incumbent
- Assumed office September 30, 2008
- Appointed by: George W. Bush
- Preceded by: Patricia C. Fawsett

Magistrate Judge of the United States District Court for the Middle District of Florida
- In office December 1997 – September 30, 2008

Personal details
- Born: Mary Adrienne Stenson; October 20, 1962 (age 63) Atlanta, Georgia, U.S.
- Education: Duke University (BA); University of Oxford (COM); Florida State University (JD)

Mary Stenson Scriven (née Stenson; born October 20, 1962) is a United States district judge of the United States District Court for the Middle District of Florida.

== Education and career ==
Born in Atlanta, Georgia, Scriven graduated from Duke University with her Bachelor of Arts degree in 1983 and later from Florida State University College of Law with a Juris Doctor in 1987.

From 1983 to 1984 she was a substitute teacher with the Bibb County Board of Education in Macon, Georgia. In 1985, she was a research assistant at the Florida State University College of Law. From 1985 to 1986, she interned in the Majority office of the Florida House of Representatives. From 1986 to 1987 she was a summer associate with Carlton Fields in Tampa, Florida and later an intern with the law firm of Huey Guilday Kursteiner & Tucker.

Following law school graduation, Scriven was in private practice in Florida from 1987 to 1997. She was an associate professor at Stetson University College of Law from 1996 to 1997.

In 1993, she was nominated by Florida Governor Lawton Chiles to serve a two-year term on the Tampa Bay Regional Planning Council. She was later confirmed by the Florida Senate and served until 1995.

== Federal judicial career ==
Scriven started her judicial career as a United States magistrate judge of the U.S. District Court for the Middle District of Florida from 1997 to 2008. Scriven was nominated as a U.S. District Judge to the same jurisdiction by President George W. Bush on July 10, 2008, to fill a seat vacated by Patricia C. Fawsett, who assumed senior status. Scriven was confirmed by the United States Senate on September 26, 2008, and received her commission on September 30, 2008.

== Notable case ==
- On October 24, 2011, Scriven temporarily blocked Florida's new law that requires welfare applicants to pass a drug test before receiving benefits, saying it may violate the Constitution's ban on unreasonable searches and seizures. The drug test can reveal a host of private medical facts about the individual, Scriven wrote, adding that she found it "troubling" that the drug tests are not kept confidential like medical records.
- Scriven presided over the copyright case between Carole Baskin and Joe Exotic.
- In mid-2025, lock picking case Proven Industries v. Trevor McNally was presided over by Scriven.

== See also ==
- List of African-American federal judges
- List of African-American jurists

== Sources ==
- Confirmation hearings on federal appointments : hearing before the Committee on the Judiciary, United States Senate, One Hundred Tenth Congress, first session 4.J 89/2:S.HRG.110-138/ PT.4 (2008)

Legal offices
Preceded by Patricia C. Fawsett	Judge of the United States District Court for the Middle District of Florida; 2008–present	Incumbent
