= Ricky K. Patel =

American lawyer and philanthropist

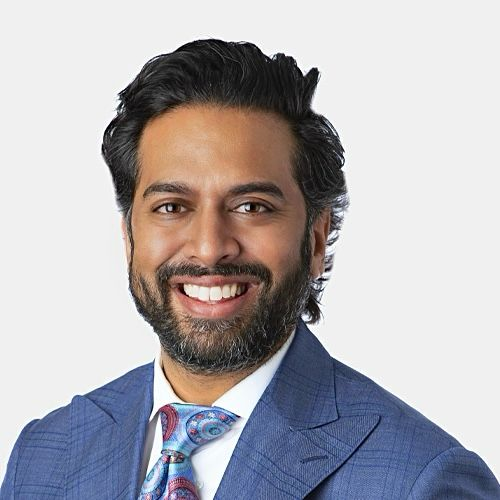
- Born: 4 May 1982 (age 44)
- Education: Florida State University (BA); St. Thomas University Benjamin L. Crump College of Law (JD)
- Occupations: Attorney; philanthropist
- Website: rickykpatel.com

Ricky Patel (born May 4, 1982) is an American lawyer and philanthropist. He is an attorney at law serving as Of Counsel with Akerman LLP in Miami. He authored the book The Beautiful Caterpillar, which he wrote with his daughter. Patel was the a member former President Barack Obama's National Finance Committee, being the youngest person to be appointed.

== Early life and education ==
Patel was born on May 4, 1982. He attended Florida State University in 2003, receiving a Bachelor of Arts degree with a focus on genocide prevention in 2006. He also served as an ambassador for the Clinton Global Initiative. He subsequently went to St. Thomas University Benjamin L. Crump College of Law and received his Juris Doctor degree in 2009.

== Career ==
After graduating from law school, Patel joined the Farrell & Patel law firm. As of 2022, he is an attorney at law serving as Of Counsel with Akerman LLP in Miami.

Since 2011, Patel has been recognized nationally for handling of extortion and sensitive matter cases for celebrities, athletes and high net worth individuals.

Patel served as a member of former President Obama's National Finance Committee. He also served as an ambassador for the Clinton Global Initiative.

=== Notable legal representations ===
- In 2010's BP oil spill case, Patel and his firm represented individuals and businesses involved, including government municipalities.
- In 2015, Patel served as defense counsel for American football player Dalvin Cook in a criminal case, in which Cook was found not guilty.
- In 2017, following Hurricane Maria in Puerto Rico, Patel represented the government in disputes with insurance companies over property damage claims. He was involved in the development of Bill 1645, legislation aimed at providing protections for Puerto Rican residents against insurance companies acting in bad faith.
- In 2020, Patel represented Hall of Fame NFL football player Warren Sapp in a lawsuit.
- In 2023, Patel was interviewed by Good Morning America regarding his representation in a wrongful death case involving a parasailing accident in Key West.

== Authorship and published works ==
Patel authored the children’s book The Beautiful Caterpillar, alongside his daughter.

== Philanthropy and community service ==
Patel founded the ITS4THEKIDS foundation, an organization intended to benefit children in need internationally. The organization provides duffle bags filled with necessities yearly to children entering the foster care system. In 2016, Patel helped to establish the Gracious Hands Orphanage in Gressier, Haiti.

In 2020, Patel created the Pay It Forward Scholarship, an initiative intended to provide funds yearly to law students helping those in need. As of 2025, Patel serves on the Board of Directors of Make-A-Wish Southern Florida.

== Awards and recognitions ==
- 2025 - Honored With Trailblazer Award by APABA.
- 2024 - Recognized as a Legal Luminary for Class Action Litigation by St. Thomas University Benjamin L. Crump College of Law
- 2021 - STU Law School, Martin Luther King Award
- 2018 - Philanthropist of the Year by Little Lighthouse Foundation
- 2013 - Recognized as 40 Under 40 by South Florida Business Journal
- 2012 - AAHOA Chairman’s Award for Leadership and Ongoing Services
