= William F. Jung =

American judge (born 1958)

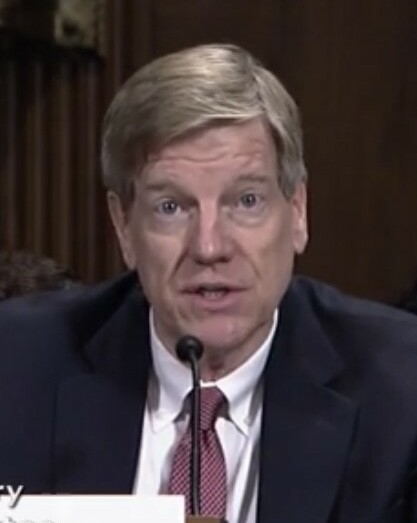

Judge of the United States District Court for the Middle District of Florida
- Incumbent
- Assumed office September 10, 2018
- Appointed by: Donald Trump
- Preceded by: Anne C. Conway

Personal details
- Born: William Frederic Jung; 1958 (age 67–68) Fort Belvoir, Virginia, U.S.
- Education: Vanderbilt University (BA); University of Illinois, Urbana-Champaign (JD)

William Frederic Jung (born 1958) is a United States district judge of the United States District Court for the Middle District of Florida.

== Early life, education, and career ==
Jung was born in 1958 in Fort Belvoir, Virginia. He received a Bachelor of Arts, magna cum laude, in 1980 from Vanderbilt University, where he was elected to Phi Beta Kappa and was a member of Kappa Sigma fraternity (Kappa chapter). He received a Juris Doctor, summa cum laude in 1983 from the University of Illinois College of Law, where he was editor in chief of the Illinois Law Review, Order of the Coif, and class valedictorian. He began his legal career as a law clerk to Judge Gerald Bard Tjoflat of the United States Court of Appeals for the Eleventh Circuit, from 1983 to 1984. From 1984 to 1985, he served as a law clerk to Associate Justice William Rehnquist of the Supreme Court of the United States.

In 1983, he became a member of the Florida Bar with the highest score in the First Appellate District. From 1985 to 1987, he was an associate in the Tampa, Florida, office of Carlton Fields. Jung served as an Assistant United States Attorney for six years, first in the Southern District of Florida, from 1987 to 1990, and subsequently in the Middle District of Florida, from 1990 to 1993. Before becoming a judge, he was a partner at the law firm of Jung & Sisco, P.A. (formerly Black & Jung, P.A.) in Tampa, Florida, which he co-founded in 1993. He specialized in white-collar criminal defense and complex civil litigation. In 2017 Florida Trend Magazine inducted Jung into its "Florida Legal Elite Hall of Fame."

Jung has published approximately thirty articles in legal publications.

== Federal judicial service ==
=== Expired district court nomination under Bush ===
On July 10, 2008, President George W. Bush nominated Jung to serve as a United States district judge of the United States District Court for the Middle District of Florida, to the seat vacated by Susan C. Bucklew, who assumed senior status on August 1, 2008. No action was taken on his nomination and it expired on January 2, 2009, with the end of the 110th Congress.

=== Expired district court nomination under Obama ===
On April 28, 2016, President Barack Obama nominated Jung to serve as a United States District Judge of the United States District Court for the Middle District of Florida, to the seat vacated by Judge Anne C. Conway, who assumed senior status on August 1, 2015. His nomination expired on January 3, 2017, with the end of the 114th Congress.

=== Renomination to district court under Trump ===
On December 20, 2017, President Donald Trump announced his intent to nominate Jung to serve as a United States district judge of the United States District Court for the Middle District of Florida. On December 21, 2017, his nomination was sent to the United States Senate. He was renominated to the same seat. On February 14, 2018, a hearing on his nomination was held before the Senate Judiciary Committee On March 15, 2018, his nomination was reported out of committee by a voice vote. On September 6, 2018, his nomination was confirmed by a voice vote. He received his judicial commission on September 10, 2018.

== Memberships ==
Jung is a member of the American College of Trial Lawyers, is a Life Fellow of the American Bar Foundation, and is board certified by the Florida Bar as an expert/specialist in criminal trial.

== See also ==
- List of law clerks for the ninth seat of the Supreme Court of the United States

Legal offices
Preceded by Anne C. Conway	Judge of the United States District Court for the Middle District of Florida; 2018–present	Incumbent
