= John W. Holland =

American judge (1883–1969)

Senior Judge of the United States District Court for the Southern District of Florida
- In office July 1, 1955 – November 14, 1969

Chief Judge of the United States District Court for the Southern District of Florida
- In office 1950–1955
- Preceded by: Louie Willard Strum
- Succeeded by: William J. Barker

Judge of the United States District Court for the Southern District of Florida
- In office June 1, 1936 – July 1, 1955
- Appointed by: Franklin D. Roosevelt
- Preceded by: Halsted L. Ritter
- Succeeded by: Joseph Patrick Lieb

Personal details
- Born: John Warthen Holland; September 30, 1883 Jackson, Tennessee
- Died: November 15, 1969 (aged 86) Coral Gables, Florida
- Education: Union University (B.A.); Vanderbilt University Law School (LL.B.)

John Warthen Holland (September 30, 1883 – November 15, 1969) was a United States district judge of the United States District Court for the Southern District of Florida.

== Education and career ==
Born in Jackson, Tennessee, Holland received a Bachelor of Arts degree from Southwestern Baptist University (now Union University) in 1904. He received a Bachelor of Laws from Vanderbilt University Law School in 1906. He was in private practice of law in Jackson from 1906 to 1910. He was in private practice of law in Jacksonville, Florida from 1910 to 1933. He was a city attorney of Jacksonville in 1929. He was United States Attorney for the Southern District of Florida from 1933 to 1936.

== Federal judicial service ==
Holland was nominated by President Franklin D. Roosevelt on May 26, 1936, to a seat on the United States District Court for the Southern District of Florida vacated by Judge Halsted L. Ritter. He was confirmed by the United States Senate on May 30, 1936, and received his commission on June 1, 1936. He served as Chief Judge from 1950 to 1955. He assumed senior status on July 1, 1955. His service was terminated on November 14, 1969, due to his death in Coral Gables, Florida.

== Sources ==
Legal offices
Preceded by Halsted L. Ritter	Judge of the United States District Court for the Southern District of Florida; 1936–1955	Succeeded by Joseph Patrick Lieb
Preceded by Louie Willard Strum	Chief Judge of the United States District Court for the Southern District of Florida; 1950–1955	Succeeded by William J. Barker
