= Joseph Patrick Lieb =

American judge

Chief Judge of the United States District Court for the Middle District of Florida
- In office 1966–1971
- Preceded by: John Milton Bryan Simpson
- Succeeded by: William McRae

Judge of the United States District Court for the Middle District of Florida
- In office October 29, 1962 – November 2, 1971
- Appointed by: operation of law
- Preceded by: Seat established by 76 Stat. 247
- Succeeded by: William Terrell Hodges

Judge of the United States District Court for the Southern District of Florida
- In office August 13, 1955 – October 29, 1962
- Appointed by: Dwight D. Eisenhower
- Preceded by: John W. Holland
- Succeeded by: Seat abolished

Personal details
- Born: Joseph Patrick Lieb; September 4, 1901 Faribault, Minnesota
- Died: November 2, 1971 (aged 70)
- Education: Georgetown Law (LL.B.)

Joseph Patrick Lieb (September 4, 1901 – November 2, 1971) was a United States district judge of the United States District Court for the Southern District of Florida and the United States District Court for the Middle District of Florida.

== Education and career ==
Born on September 4, 1901, in Faribault, Minnesota, Lieb received a Bachelor of Laws in 1924 from Georgetown Law. He was a special agent with the Federal Bureau of Investigation from 1925 to 1931. He was an Assistant United States Attorney for the Southern District of Florida from 1931 to 1934. He was in private practice in Tampa, Florida from 1934 to 1955.

== Federal judicial service ==
Lieb received a recess appointment from President Dwight D. Eisenhower on August 13, 1955, to a seat on the United States District Court for the Southern District of Florida vacated by Judge John W. Holland. He was nominated to the same position by President Eisenhower on January 12, 1956. He was confirmed by the United States Senate on March 1, 1956, and received his commission the next day. Lieb was reassigned by operation of law to the United States District Court for the Middle District of Florida on October 29, 1962, to a new seat authorized by 76 Stat. 247. He served as Chief Judge from 1966 to 1971. His service terminated on November 2, 1971, due to his death.

=== Notable case ===
On the bench, Lieb presided over the first desegregation of Pinellas County, Florida schools and two other counties. He scrupulously followed the lead of higher federal courts when school desegregation cases began to come his way in the middle 1960s, even though his decisions were sometimes at odds with his own conservative leanings.

== Sources ==
Legal offices
Preceded by John W. Holland	Judge of the United States District Court for the Southern District of Florida; 1955–1962	Succeeded by Seat abolished
Preceded by Seat established by 76 Stat. 247	Judge of the United States District Court for the Middle District of Florida; 1962–1971	Succeeded by William Terrell Hodges
Preceded by John Milton Bryan Simpson	Chief Judge of the United States District Court for the Middle District of Florida; 1966–1971	Succeeded by William McRae
