= George C. Carr =

American judge

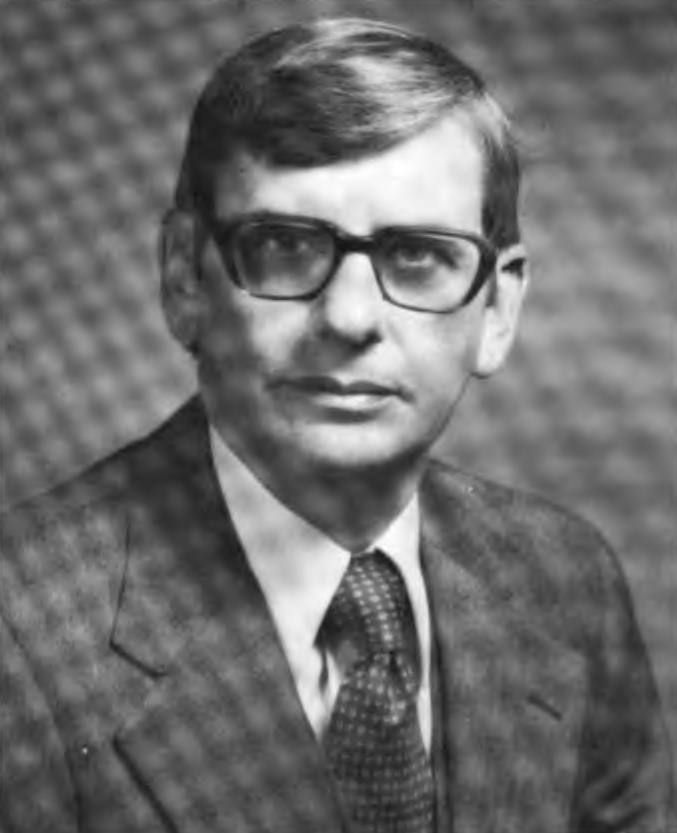

Chief Judge of the United States District Court for the Middle District of Florida
- In office 1989–1990
- Preceded by: William Terrell Hodges
- Succeeded by: Susan H. Black

Judge of the United States District Court for the Middle District of Florida
- In office December 16, 1977 – January 26, 1990
- Appointed by: Jimmy Carter
- Preceded by: Charles R. Scott
- Succeeded by: Anne C. Conway

Personal details
- Born: George Carter Carr; July 26, 1929 Lakeland, Florida
- Died: January 26, 1990 (aged 60) Lakeland, Florida
- Education: University of Florida (BSBA); Fredric G. Levin College of Law (LLB)

George Carter Carr (July 26, 1929 – January 26, 1990) was an American lawyer and a United States district judge of the United States District Court for the Middle District of Florida.

== Education and career ==
Born in Lakeland, Florida, Carr received his Bachelor of Science in Business Administration from the University of Florida in 1951 and his Bachelor of Laws from the Fredric G. Levin College of Law at the University of Florida in 1954. Carr was in private practice in Florida from 1954 to 1978. He served as assistant county attorney to the Board of County Commissioners of Polk County from 1959 to 1973 and county attorney from 1973 to 1978.

== Federal judicial service ==
President Jimmy Carter nominated Carr to the United States District Court for the Middle District of Florida on November 21, 1977, to the seat vacated by Judge Charles R. Scott. Confirmed by the United States Senate on December 15, 1977, he received commission the next day. Carr served as Chief Judge from 1989 to 1990. He remained on the court until his death at age 60 from a brain tumor on January 26, 1990, in Lakeland. He was succeeded on the court by Judge Anne C. Conway.

== Sources ==
- "Obituary". The New York Times.

Legal offices
Preceded by Charles R. Scott	Judge of the United States District Court for the Middle District of Florida; 1977–1990	Succeeded by Anne C. Conway
Preceded by William Terrell Hodges	Chief Judge of the United States District Court for the Middle District of Florida; 1989–1990	Succeeded by Susan H. Black
