= John A. Reed Jr. =

American judge

Judge of the United States District Court for the Middle District of Florida
- In office August 6, 1973 – December 31, 1984
- Appointed by: Richard Nixon
- Preceded by: William McRae
- Succeeded by: Patricia C. Fawsett

Personal details
- Born: John Alton Reed Jr. June 29, 1931 Washington, D.C.
- Died: February 19, 2015 (aged 83) Brevard, North Carolina
- Citizenship: US
- Spouse: Louisa Wardman Reed
- Children: 3
- Parents: Dr. John Alton Reed (father); Emma Ball Reed (mother)
- Education: Duke University (A.B.); Duke University School of Law (LL.B.)
- Profession: attorney, judge

John Alton Reed Jr. (June 29, 1931 – February 19, 2015) was an American lawyer and United States district judge of the United States District Court for the Middle District of Florida.

== Education and career ==
Born on June 29, 1931, in Washington, D.C., Reed received an Artium Baccalaureus degree from Duke University in 1954. He received a Bachelor of Laws from Duke University School of Law in 1956. He was in private practice of law in Tampa, Florida from 1956 to 1957. He was in private practice of law in Orlando, Florida from 1959 to 1967. He was a judge of the Florida Fourth District Court of Appeal from 1967 to 1973. He was Chief Judge from 1971 to 1973.

== Federal judicial service ==
Reed was nominated by President Richard Nixon on July 6, 1973, to a seat on the United States District Court for the Middle District of Florida vacated by Judge William McRae. He was confirmed by the United States Senate on August 3, 1973, and received his commission on August 6, 1973. His service was terminated on December 31, 1984, due to his resignation.

=== Notable clerk ===
Anne C. Conway, who later also was a judge of the United States District Court for the Middle District of Florida, was a law clerk for Reed.

== Post judicial service ==
After his resignation from the federal bench, Reed returned to private practice in Orlando, where he was a named partner with the firm of Lowndes, Drosdick, Doster, Kantor & Reed, P.A. After retirement, he became an arbitrator for Federal Arbitration, Inc., an arbitration firm specializing in federal cases. He died on February 19, 2015, at the Transylvania Regional Hospital located in downtown Brevard, North Carolina. He resided in the nearby unincorporated community of Sapphire, North Carolina after his retirement from the practice of law.

== Sources ==
Legal offices
Preceded by William McRae	Judge of the United States District Court for the Middle District of Florida; 1973–1984	Succeeded by Patricia C. Fawsett
