= Patricia C. Fawsett =

American judge (born 1943)

Senior Judge of the United States District Court for the Middle District of Florida
- Incumbent
- Assumed office August 25, 2008

Chief Judge of the United States District Court for the Middle District of Florida
- In office 2003–2008
- Preceded by: Elizabeth A. Kovachevich
- Succeeded by: Anne C. Conway

Judge of the United States District Court for the Middle District of Florida
- In office June 9, 1986 – August 25, 2008
- Appointed by: Ronald Reagan
- Preceded by: John A. Reed Jr.
- Succeeded by: Mary Stenson Scriven

Personal details
- Born: August 21, 1943 (age 82) Montreal, Canada
- Education: University of Florida (BA, MAT, JD)

Patricia Combs Fawsett (born August 21, 1943) is a senior United States district judge of the United States District Court for the Middle District of Florida.

== Education and career ==
Fawsett was born in 1943 in Montreal, Canada. She received her Bachelor of Arts degree from the University of Florida in 1965, her Master of Arts in Teaching from the University of Florida in 1966, and her Juris Doctor from the University of Florida College of Law in 1973. Fawsett was in private practice in Orlando, Florida, from 1973 to 1986.

== Federal judicial service ==
President Ronald Reagan nominated Fawsett to the United States District Court for the Middle District of Florida on April 9, 1986, to the seat vacated by Judge John A. Reed Jr.. She was confirmed by the Senate on June 6, 1986, she received her commission three days later. She served as chief judge from 2003 to 2008. She assumed senior status on August 25, 2008.

== Notable cases ==
In the nation's first federal prosecution for carjacking, Fawsett sentenced three of the four defendants of the 1992 Kissimmee carjacking murders to life without parole plus 25 years. The trio – Alf Catholic, Gerard Booker and Jermaine Foster – were convicted of conspiracy, armed carjacking, and weapon use charges under the Federal Anti-Car Theft Act of 1992. In a separate hearing, Fawsett also sentenced the fourth defendant, Leondra Henderson, to 40 years in prison, later reduced to 33 years, for carjacking charges, which Henderson pleaded guilty after he agreed to testify for the prosecution against his accomplices. The four men later stood trial for first-degree murder charges in state court, and Foster was sentenced to death while Henderson, Booker and Catholic were sentenced to life in prison.

Fawsett sentenced Keith Pound to 740 years in prison and Sholam Weiss to 845 years in prison after the two men were found guilty of multiple counts of financial crime, money-laundering, and a fraud scheme against National Heritage Life Insurance. She also sentenced Erin Sharma, a federal corrections officer who deliberately arranged to move an alleged inmate informant into the cell of a notoriously violent inmate, resulting in his fatal beating, to life in prison.

Legal offices
Preceded by John A. Reed Jr.	Judge of the United States District Court for the Middle District of Florida; 1986–2008	Succeeded by Mary Stenson Scriven
Preceded by Elizabeth A. Kovachevich	Chief Judge of the United States District Court for the Middle District of Florida; 2003–2008	Succeeded by Anne C. Conway
