= Charles R. Scott =

American judge

Charles Ray Scott

Senior Judge of the United States District Court for the Middle District of Florida
- In office November 12, 1976 – May 12, 1983

Judge of the United States District Court for the Middle District of Florida
- In office November 3, 1966 – November 12, 1976
- Appointed by: Lyndon B. Johnson
- Preceded by: Seat established by 80 Stat. 75
- Succeeded by: George C. Carr

Personal details
- Born: Charles Ray Scott; January 13, 1904 Adel, Iowa
- Died: May 12, 1983 (aged 79) Savannah, Georgia
- Education: Valparaiso University School of Law (LL.B.)

Charles Ray Scott (January 13, 1904 – May 12, 1983) was a United States district judge of the United States District Court for the Middle District of Florida.

== Education and career ==
Born in Adel, Iowa, Scott received his Bachelor of Laws from Valparaiso University School of Law in 1934. In 1925, he was title clerk at the Chicago Title & Trust Company in Chicago, Illinois. From 1926 to 1960, he was in private practice in Jacksonville, Florida. He served as a circuit judge of the 4th Judicial Circuit of Florida from 1960 to 1966.

== Federal judicial service ==
Scott was nominated by President Lyndon B. Johnson on October 11, 1966, to the United States District Court for the Middle District of Florida, to a new seat created by 80 Stat. 75. He was confirmed by the United States Senate on October 20, 1966, and received his commission on November 3, 1966. He assumed senior status on November 12, 1976. His service was terminated on May 12, 1983, due to his death.

=== Notable clerk ===
Andrew McClurg, a noted professor of torts, was a law clerk to Scott.

=== Notable cases ===
Scott incurred the ire of Florida Governor Claude R. Kirk Jr. in 1970 for issuing busing orders for Volusia County schools; Kirk denounced Scott on television and called for his impeachment. In 1980, Scott approved the settlement of a civil rights suit filed by state prison inmates, setting a cap on the state prison population and sparking a prison reform effort for inmate health care.

== Death ==
Scott died on May 12, 1983, at Memorial Medical Center in Savannah, Georgia. He suffered a cerebral hemorrhage in his hotel room while attending a conference of judges of the 11th Judicial Circuit and never regained consciousness.

== Sources ==
Legal offices
Preceded by Seat established by 80 Stat. 75	Judge of the United States District Court for the Middle District of Florida; 1966–1976	Succeeded by George C. Carr
