= Alex Akerman Jr. =

American politician (1910–1998)

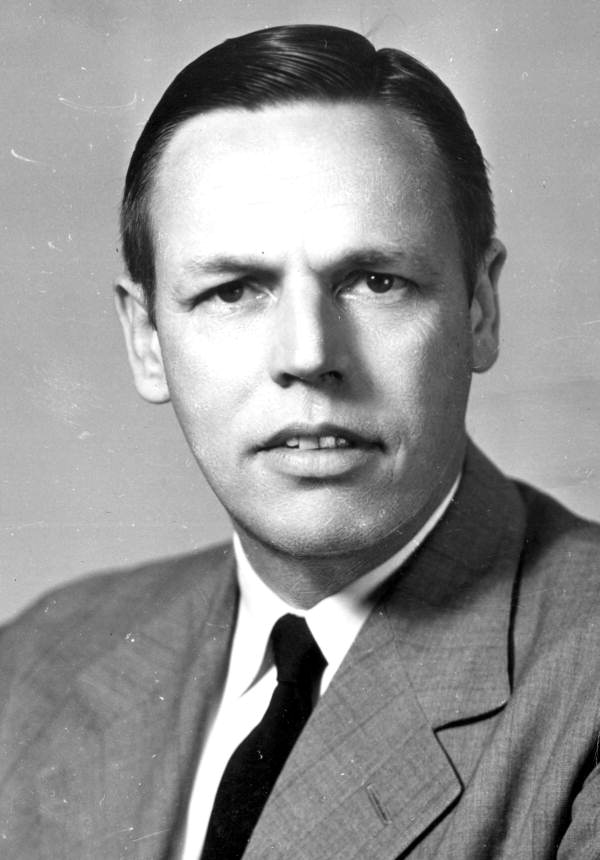
- Akerman in 1947

Member of the Florida House of Representatives from Orange County
- In office 1947–1948

Personal details
- Born: January 12, 1910 Macon, Georgia, U.S.
- Died: April 4, 1998 (aged 88)
- Party: Republican
- Parent: Alexander Akerman (father)
- Relatives: Amos T. Akerman (grandfather)
- Education: Mercer University; Columbia University; University of Florida

Alex Akerman Jr. (January 12, 1910 – April 4, 1998) was an American politician. He served as a Republican member of the Florida House of Representatives.

== Life and career ==
Akerman was born in Macon, Georgia. He attended Mercer University, Columbia University and the University of Florida.

Akerman served in the Florida House of Representatives from 1947 to 1948.

Akerman served as a delegate to the 1948 Republican National Convention.

Akerman died on April 4, 1998, at the age of 88.
