= Andrew McClurg =

American legal academic

- Born: Andrew Jay McClurg; October 15, 1954 (age 71); East Lansing, Michigan, U.S
- Education: University of Florida (B.S., J.D.)
- Occupation: Professor of Law

Andrew Jay McClurg (born October 15, 1954) is a professor of law holding the Herbert Herff Chair of Excellence in Law at the University of Memphis Cecil C. Humphreys School of Law, specializing in torts, products liability, privacy law, and firearms policy. Although he has published numerous academic works, he is also known as a legal humorist, having written two legal humor books, as well as a monthly legal humor column in the American Bar Association Journal that ran for more than four years. He is also the creator of Lawhaha.com, a legal humor website.

== Early life ==
Andrew Jay McClurg was born October 15, 1954 in East Lansing, Michigan. He received his Bachelor of Science and Juris Doctor from the University of Florida, where he was a member of the Florida Law Review and graduated Order of the Coif.

== Career ==
He then served as a law clerk to U.S. District Judge Charles R. Scott (M.D. Fla.). After working for several years as a litigator, McClurg began his academic career at the University of Arkansas at Little Rock, where he eventually became the Nadine H. Baum Distinguished Professor of Law. He also taught as a visiting law professor at Wake Forest University, the University of Colorado, and Golden Gate University. In 2002, he became a member of the founding faculty at the Florida International University College of Law. In 2006, he accepted the Herff Chair at the University of Memphis.

McClurg has received several awards for both teaching and research. His teaching awards include the University of Memphis's 2009-10 Distinguished Teaching Award and 2009 Excellence in Legal Education Award, as well as five other teaching awards (including four Teacher of the Year awards). He has received three law school excellence awards for research, most recently the 2017 Farris Bobango Award for Faculty Scholarship.

== Publications ==
McClurg's published literature comprises seven books, including the popular law school prep book, 1L of a Ride: A Well-Traveled Professor's Roadmap to Success in the First Year of Law School. He has published twenty-seven law review articles, including those at Northwestern University, Boston University, the University of Notre Dame, University of North Carolina at Chapel Hill, American University, Cincinnati, Colorado, Oregon, UC Davis, UC Hastings, Temple, Connecticut, and Wake Forest; and roughly seventy-five other articles.

=== Books ===
- The Law School Trip (the insider's guide to law school) (Trafford 2001). ISBN 1-55212-646-3
- Gun Control and Gun Rights (New York University Press 2002) (with David Kopel and Brannon Denning). ISBN 0-8147-4759-0
- Amicus Curiae: An Anthology of Legal Humor (Carolina Academic Press 2003) (with Robert M. Jarvis and Thomas E. Baker). ISBN 0-89089-410-8
- Practical Global Tort Litigation: United States, Germany, and Argentina (Carolina Academic Press 2007) (with Adem Koyuncu and Luis Sprovieri) ISBN 978-1594601927
- The "Companion Text" to Law School: Understanding and Surviving Life with a Law Student (West Academic Publishing 2012). ISBN 978-0314267412
- Guns and the Law: Cases, Problems, and Explanation (Carolina Academic Press 2016) (with Brannon Denning). ISBN 978-1611635386
- 1L of a Ride: A Well-Traveled Professor's Roadmap to Success in the First Year of Law School (West Academic Publishing 3d ed. 2017). ISBN 978-1634607896
