= George C. Young =

American judge

George Cressler Young
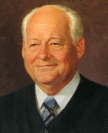

Senior Judge of the United States District Court for the Middle District of Florida
- In office October 19, 1981 – April 24, 2015

Chief Judge of the United States District Court for the Middle District of Florida
- In office 1973–1981
- Preceded by: William McRae
- Succeeded by: Ben Krentzman

Judge of the United States District Court for the Middle District of Florida
- In office October 29, 1962 – October 19, 1981
- Appointed by: operation of law
- Preceded by: Seat established by 76 Stat. 247
- Succeeded by: Elizabeth A. Kovachevich

Judge of the United States District Court for the Northern District of Florida Judge of the United States District Court for the Southern District of Florida
- In office September 18, 1961 – September 17, 1966
- Appointed by: John F. Kennedy
- Preceded by: George William Whitehurst
- Succeeded by: Seat abolished

Personal details
- Born: George Cressler Jung; August 4, 1916 Cincinnati, Ohio, U.S.
- Died: April 24, 2015 (aged 98) Orlando, Florida, U.S.
- Education: University of Florida (A.B.); Fredric G. Levin College of Law (LL.B.)

George Cressler Young (né Jung; August 4, 1916 – April 24, 2015) was a United States district judge of the United States District Court for the Northern District of Florida, the United States District Court for the Middle District of Florida and the United States District Court for the Southern District of Florida.

== Education and career ==
Born on August 4, 1916, in Cincinnati, Ohio, Young received an Artium Baccalaureus degree in 1938 from the University of Florida and a Bachelor of Laws in 1940 from the Fredric G. Levin College of Law at the University of Florida. He entered private practice in Winter Haven, Florida from 1941 to 1942. He served as a lieutenant in the United States Navy from 1942 to 1946. He returned to private practice in Miami, Florida to 1947 to 1948. He served as an administrative assistant to United States Representative and United States Senator George Smathers from 1948 to 1951. He returned to private practice in Jacksonville, Florida from 1951 to 1961.

== Federal judicial service ==
Young was nominated by President John F. Kennedy on September 5, 1961, to a joint seat on the United States District Court for the Northern District of Florida and the United States District Court for the Southern District of Florida vacated by Judge George William Whitehurst. He was confirmed by the United States Senate on September 14, 1961, and received his commission on September 18, 1961. He was assigned by operation of law to serve additionally on the United States District Court for the Middle District of Florida on October 29, 1962, to a new seat authorized by 76 Stat. 247. His service on the Northern and Southern Districts was terminated on September 17, 1966, and he thereafter served solely on the Middle District. He served as Chief Judge from 1973 to 1981. He assumed senior status on October 19, 1981. His service terminated on April 24, 2015, due to his death of a heart attack in Orlando, Florida.

== See also ==
- List of United States federal judges by longevity of service

== Sources ==
Legal offices
Preceded by George William Whitehurst	Judge of the United States District Court for the Northern District of Florida; Judge of the United States District Court for the Southern District of Florida; 1961–1966	Succeeded by Seat abolished
Preceded by Seat established by 76 Stat. 247	Judge of the United States District Court for the Middle District of Florida; 1962–1981	Succeeded by Elizabeth A. Kovachevich
Preceded by William McRae	Chief Judge of the United States District Court for the Middle District of Florida; 1973–1981	Succeeded by Ben Krentzman
