= William Terrell Hodges =

American judge (1934–2022)

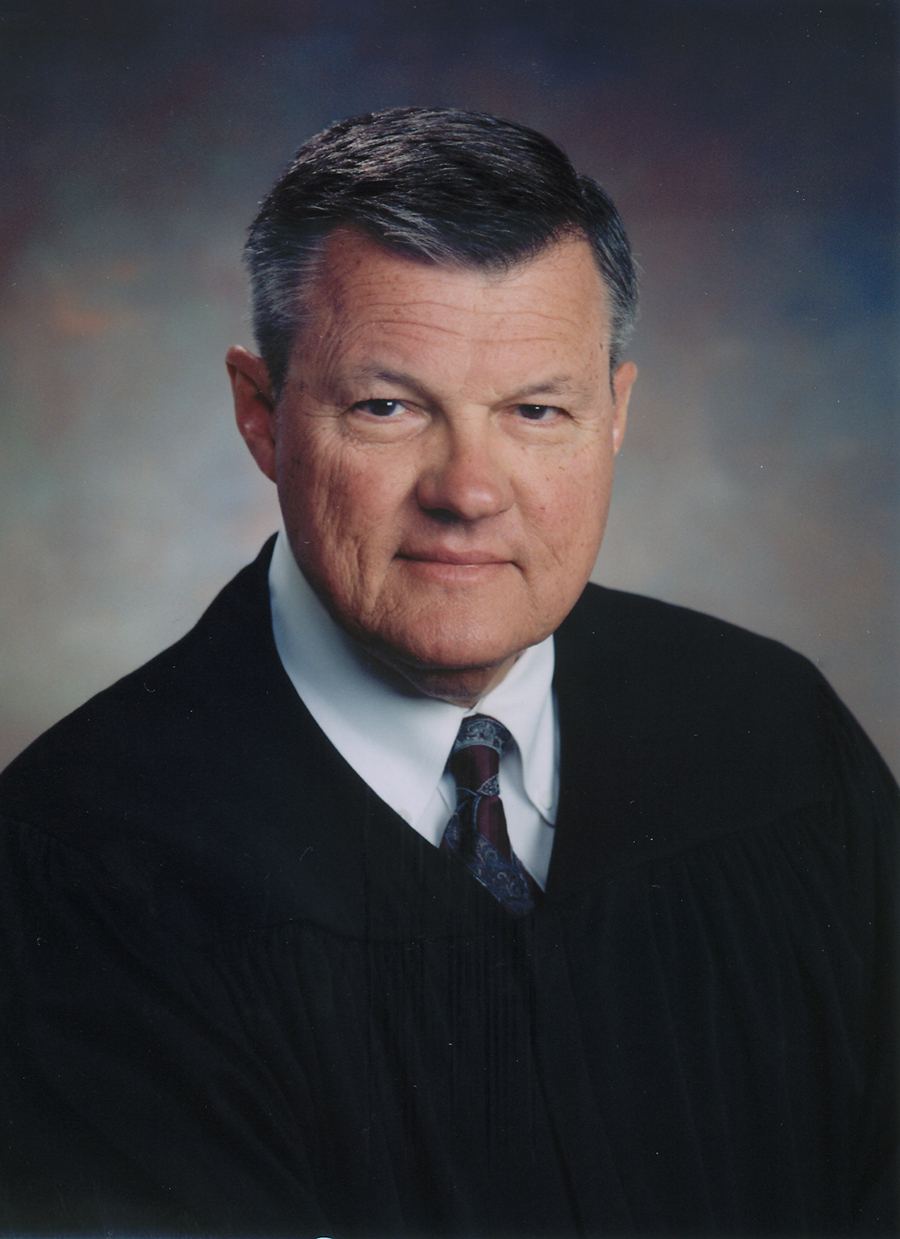

Senior Judge of the United States District Court for the Middle District of Florida
- In office May 2, 1999 – January 4, 2022

Chief Judge of the United States District Court for the Middle District of Florida
- In office 1982–1989
- Preceded by: Ben Krentzman
- Succeeded by: George C. Carr

Judge of the United States District Court for the Middle District of Florida
- In office December 15, 1971 – May 2, 1999
- Appointed by: Richard Nixon
- Preceded by: Joseph Patrick Lieb
- Succeeded by: James D. Whittemore

Personal details
- Born: April 28, 1934 Lake Wales, Florida
- Died: January 4, 2022 (aged 87)
- Education: University of Florida (BSBA, JD)

William Terrell Hodges (April 28, 1934 – January 4, 2022) was a United States district judge of the United States District Court for the Middle District of Florida.

== Education and career ==
Born on April 28, 1934, in Lake Wales, Florida, Hodges received a Bachelor of Science in Business Administration from the University of Florida in 1956, and a Juris Doctor from its Fredric G. Levin College of Law in 1958. He was in private practice of law in Tampa, Florida from 1958 to 1971. He was an Instructor in business at the University of South Florida from 1961 to 1966.

== Federal judicial service ==
Hodges was nominated by President Richard Nixon on December 8, 1971, to the United States District Court for the Middle District of Florida, to a seat vacated by Judge Joseph Patrick Lieb. He was confirmed by the United States Senate on December 11, 1971, and received his commission on December 15, 1971. He served as Chief Judge from 1982 to 1989. Hodges was the Chair of the Judicial Panel on Multidistrict Litigation until June 13, 2007, when his term on that body ended. He assumed senior status on May 2, 1999. Through 2018, he was a member of the Committee on Court Administration and Case Management (CACM) of the Judicial Conference of the United States, which he chaired through October 1, 2018. Hodges died on January 4, 2022.

== Notable case ==
Hodges presided over the 2008 trial of celebrity actor Wesley Snipes for failure to file personal income tax returns (not to be confused with tax evasion). Snipes was convicted on three misdemeanor charges, however Judge Hodges sentenced Snipes to three years in prison and an additional year of probation.

== Personal life and death ==
Hodges died on January 4, 2022, at the age of 87.

== See also ==
- List of United States federal judges by longevity of service

== Sources ==
Legal offices
Preceded by Joseph Patrick Lieb	Judge of the United States District Court for the Middle District of Florida; 1971–1999	Succeeded by James D. Whittemore
Preceded by Ben Krentzman	Chief Judge of the United States District Court for the Middle District of Florida; 1982–1989	Succeeded by George C. Carr
