= William J. Barker =

American judge

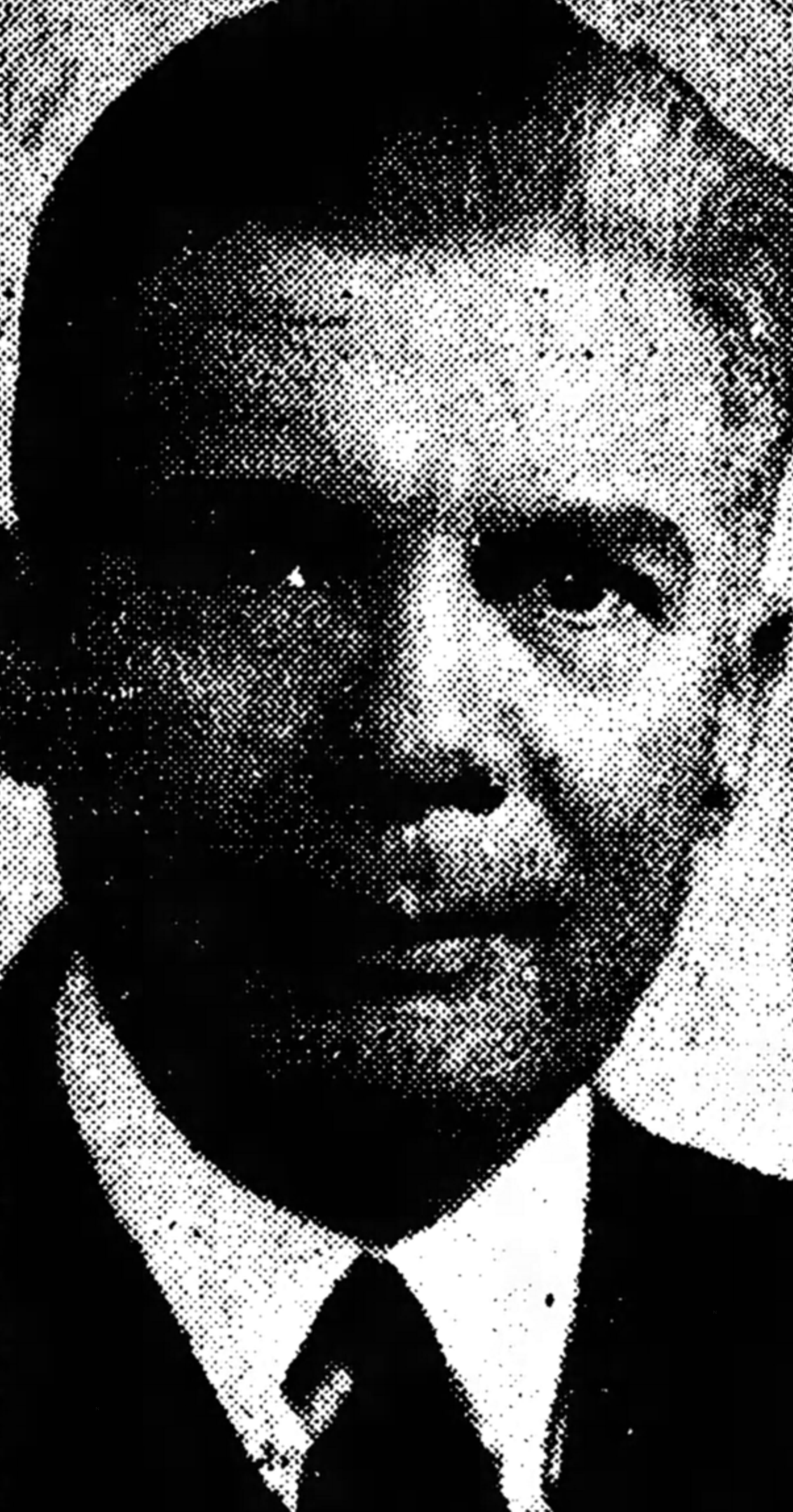

Senior Judge of the United States District Court for the Southern District of Florida
- In office April 30, 1959 – April 13, 1968

Chief Judge of the United States District Court for the Southern District of Florida
- In office 1955–1959
- Preceded by: John W. Holland
- Succeeded by: George William Whitehurst

Judge of the United States District Court for the Southern District of Florida
- In office February 5, 1940 – April 30, 1959
- Appointed by: Franklin D. Roosevelt
- Preceded by: Alexander Akerman
- Succeeded by: William McRae

Personal details
- Born: William Julius Barker; June 25, 1886 Marietta, Georgia
- Died: April 13, 1968 (aged 81)
- Education: Fredric G. Levin College of Law (LL.B.)

William Julius Barker (June 25, 1886 – April 13, 1968), frequently known as W. J. Barker, was an American lawyer and United States district judge of the United States District Court for the Southern District of Florida.

== Education and career ==
Born on June 25, 1886, in Marietta, Georgia, Barker attended the Fredric G. Levin College of Law at the University of Florida and received his Bachelor of Laws in 1916. Barker was in private practice in Jacksonville, Florida from 1916 to 1925, and was a circuit court judge in Highlands County, Florida from 1925 to 1940.

== Federal judicial service ==
President Franklin D. Roosevelt nominated Barker to the United States District Court for the Southern District of Florida on January 11, 1940, to the seat vacated by Judge Alexander Akerman. Confirmed by the Senate on February 1, 1940, he received his commission on February 5, 1940. Barker served as Chief Judge from 1955 to 1959. He assumed senior status on April 30, 1959, and remained on the court until his death on April 13, 1968.

== Sources ==
Legal offices
Preceded by Alexander Akerman	Judge of the United States District Court for the Southern District of Florida; 1940–1959	Succeeded by William McRae
Preceded by John W. Holland	Chief Judge of the United States District Court for the Southern District of Florida; 1955–1959	Succeeded by George William Whitehurst
