= Alexander Akerman =

American judge (1869–1948)

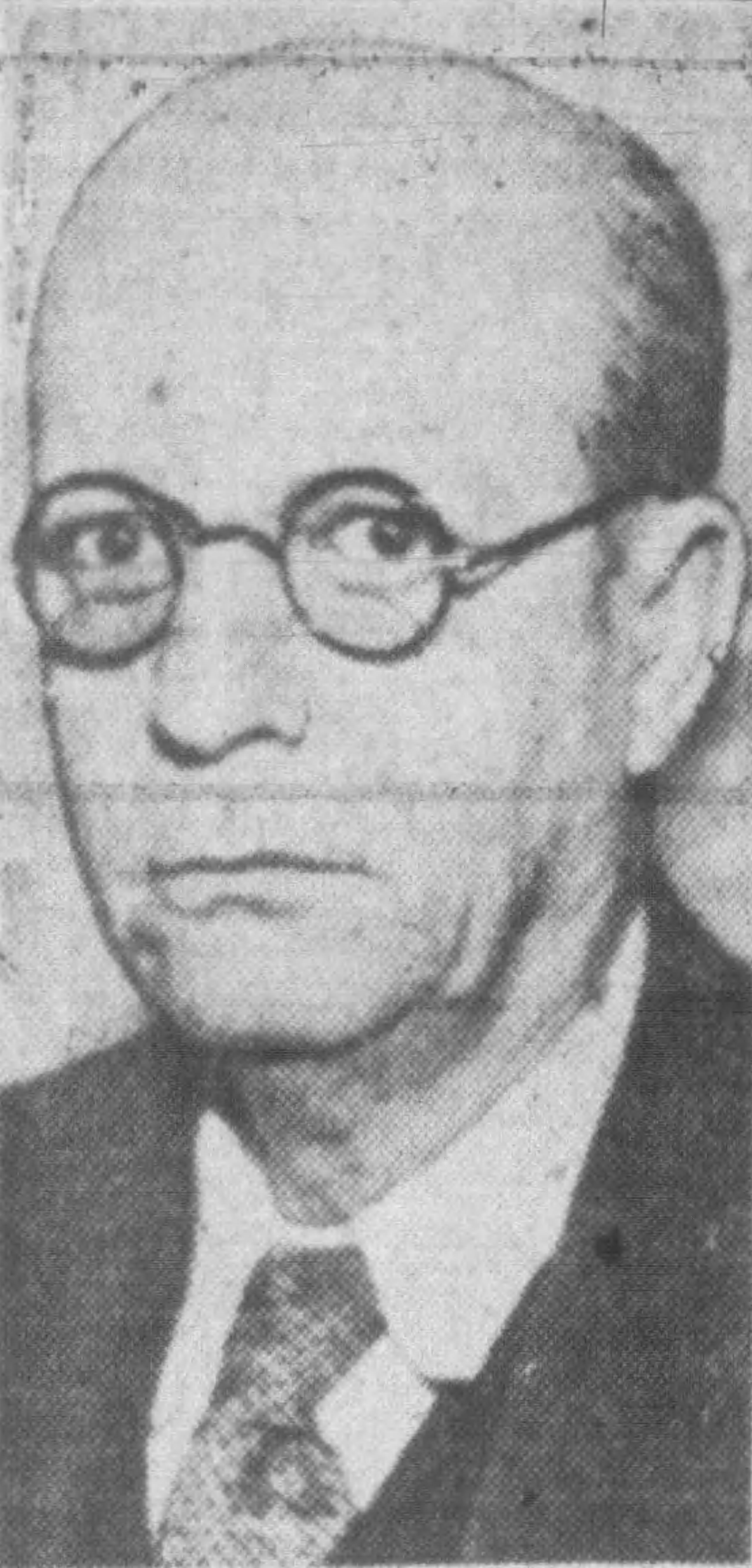

Senior Judge of the United States District Court for the Southern District of Florida
- In office October 8, 1939 – August 21, 1948

Judge of the United States District Court for the Southern District of Florida
- In office February 15, 1929 – October 8, 1939
- Appointed by: Calvin Coolidge
- Preceded by: Seat established by 45 Stat. 1081
- Succeeded by: William J. Barker

Personal details
- Born: Alexander Akerman; October 9, 1869 Elberton, Georgia, U.S.
- Died: August 21, 1948 (aged 78)
- Children: Alex Akerman Jr.
- Parent: Amos T. Akerman (father)
- Education: read law

Alexander Akerman (October 9, 1869 – August 21, 1948) was a United States district judge of the United States District Court for the Southern District of Florida.

== Education and career ==
Akerman was born on October 9, 1869, in Elberton, Georgia. His father was the noted lawyer Amos T. Akerman. He read law in 1892 and entered private practice in Cartersville, Georgia the same year. In 1898, Akerman was a Referee in Bankruptcy (a position created by the Bankruptcy Act of 1898, and the predecessor of modern bankruptcy judges) for the United States District Court for the Southern District of Georgia. Akerman was an Assistant United States Attorney for the Southern District of Georgia from 1901 to 1912 and was the United States Attorney for the Southern District of Georgia from 1912 to 1914. In 1914, Akerman relocated to Florida. He was in private practice in Kissimmee, Florida from 1914 to 1920. In 1920, Akerman moved to Orlando, Florida and formed, with John Moses Cheney, a new law firm. Today the firm is known as Akerman LLP and is one of the largest firms in Florida.

== Federal judicial service ==
President Calvin Coolidge nominated Akerman to the United States District Court for the Southern District of Florida on January 19, 1929, to a new seat created by 45 Stat. 1081. Confirmed by the Senate on February 15, 1929, he received commission the same day. Akerman assumed senior status on October 8, 1939. He remained on the court until his death on August 21, 1948.

== Sources ==
Legal offices
Preceded by Seat established by 45 Stat. 1081	Judge of the United States District Court for the Southern District of Florida; 1929–1939	Succeeded by William J. Barker
