= William McRae =

American judge (1909–1973)

- McRea in uniform for the Florida Gators college football team in 1929

Chief Judge of the United States District Court for the Middle District of Florida
- In office 1971–1973
- Preceded by: Joseph Patrick Lieb
- Succeeded by: George C. Young

Judge of the United States District Court for the Middle District of Florida
- In office October 29, 1962 – January 27, 1973
- Appointed by: operation of law
- Preceded by: Seat established by 76 Stat. 247
- Succeeded by: John A. Reed Jr.

Judge of the United States District Court for the Southern District of Florida
- In office March 8, 1961 – October 29, 1962
- Appointed by: John F. Kennedy
- Preceded by: William J. Barker
- Succeeded by: Seat abolished

Personal details
- Born: William Allan McRae Jr. September 25, 1909 Marianna, Florida
- Died: January 27, 1973 (aged 63)
- Education: University of Florida (A.B.); University of Oxford (B.A., B.Litt.); Fredric G. Levin College of Law (J.D.)
- Football career

No. 9
- Position: Guard

Career information
- High school: West Palm Beach
- College: Florida (1928–1932)

Awards and highlights
- Second-team All-American (1928)

William Allan McRae Jr. (September 25, 1909 – January 27, 1973) was a United States district judge of the United States District Court for the Middle District of Florida and the United States District Court for the Southern District of Florida and was a second team All-American football player for the University of Florida.

== Education and career ==
Born in Marianna, Florida, McRae received an Artium Baccalaureus degree from the University of Florida in 1932. He received a Bachelor of Arts degree from Oxford University in 1933. He received a Juris Doctor from the Fredric G. Levin College of Law at the University of Florida in 1933. He received a Bachelor of Letters from Oxford University in 1936. He was in private practice of law in Jacksonville, Florida from 1936 to 1940. He was a Professor of Law at the University of Florida from 1940 to 1941. He was in the United States Army Air Corps as a Colonel from 1942 to 1945. He served as an adviser to the Joint Chiefs of Staff at the June 1945 San Francisco Conference, which founded the United Nations and drafted the United Nations Charter. He was in private practice of law in Bartow, Florida from 1946 to 1961.

=== College football career ===
While attending Florida, McRae played at the guard position for coach Charlie Bachman's Florida Gators football team from 1928 to 1930. During his sophomore season in 1928, he was a standout lineman for the Gators team that finished 8–1, losing only to the Tennessee Volunteers by single point in the final game of the season. After the season, United Press named him as a second-team All-American on its 1928 All-America Team.

== Federal judicial service ==
McRae was nominated by President John F. Kennedy on February 20, 1961, to a seat on the United States District Court for the Southern District of Florida vacated by Judge William J. Barker. He was confirmed by the United States Senate on March 3, 1961, and received his commission on March 8, 1961. He was reassigned by operation of law to the United States District Court for the Middle District of Florida on October 29, 1962, to a new seat established by 76 Stat. 247. He served as Chief Judge from 1971 to 1973. His service was terminated on January 27, 1973, due to his death.

== See also ==
- 1928 College Football All-America Team
- Florida Gators football, 1920–29
- List of federal judges appointed by John F. Kennedy
- List of Florida Gators football All-Americans
- List of Levin College of Law graduates
- List of University of Florida alumni

Legal offices
Preceded by William J. Barker	Judge of the United States District Court for the Southern District of Florida; 1961–1962	Succeeded by Seat abolished
Preceded by Seat established by 76 Stat. 247	Judge of the United States District Court for the Middle District of Florida; 1962–1973	Succeeded by John A. Reed Jr.
Preceded by Joseph Patrick Lieb	Chief Judge of the United States District Court for the Middle District of Florida; 1971–1973	Succeeded by George C. Young
