= George William Whitehurst =

American judge

Senior Judge of the United States District Court for the Northern District of Florida Senior Judge of the United States District Court for the Southern District of Florida
- In office June 30, 1961 – January 13, 1974

Chief Judge of the United States District Court for the Southern District of Florida
- In office 1959–1961
- Preceded by: William J. Barker
- Succeeded by: John Milton Bryan Simpson

Judge of the United States District Court for the Northern District of Florida Judge of the United States District Court for the Southern District of Florida
- In office February 23, 1950 – June 30, 1961
- Appointed by: Harry S. Truman
- Preceded by: Seat established by 63 Stat. 493
- Succeeded by: George C. Young

Personal details
- Born: George William Whitehurst; May 18, 1891 Wauchula, Florida
- Died: January 13, 1974 (aged 82)
- Education: Fredric G. Levin College of Law (LL.B.)

George William Whitehurst (May 18, 1891 – January 13, 1974) was a Florida state court judge and later a United States district judge of the United States District Court for the Northern District of Florida and the United States District Court for the Southern District of Florida.

== Education and career ==
Born in Wauchula, Florida, Whitehurst received a Bachelor of Laws from the Fredric G. Levin College of Law at the University of Florida. He entered private practice from 1915 to 1916. He was a county judge in DeSoto County, Florida from 1917 to 1919, and a Judge of the Twelfth Judicial Circuit Court of Florida from 1919 to 1947.

== Federal judicial service ==
Whitehurst was nominated by President Harry S. Truman on January 30, 1950, to the United States District Court for the Northern District of Florida and the United States District Court for the Southern District of Florida, to a new joint seat authorized by 63 Stat. 493. He was confirmed by the United States Senate on February 21, 1950, and received his commission on February 23, 1950. He served as Chief Judge of the Southern District from 1959 to 1961. He assumed senior status on June 30, 1961. His service terminated on January 13, 1974, due to his death.

== Sources ==
Legal offices
Preceded by Seat established by 63 Stat. 493	Judge of the United States District Court for the Northern District of Florida; Judge of the United States District Court for the Southern District of Florida; 1950–1961	Succeeded by George C. Young
Preceded by William J. Barker	Chief Judge of the United States District Court for the Southern District of Florida; 1959–1961	Succeeded by John Milton Bryan Simpson
