= Amos T. Akerman =

American politician (1821–1880)

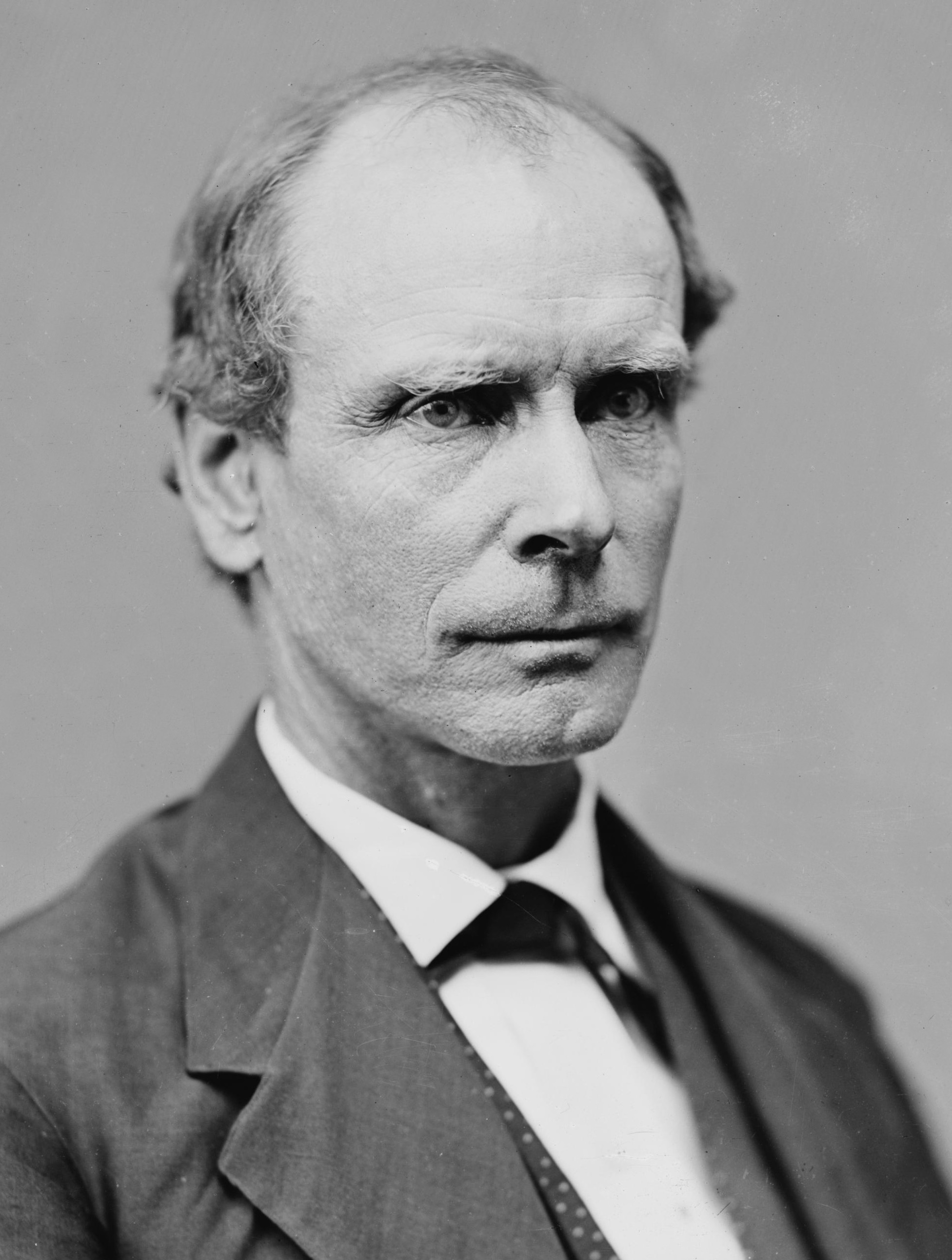

31st United States Attorney General
- In office November 23, 1870 – December 13, 1871
- President: Ulysses S. Grant
- Preceded by: Ebenezer R. Hoar
- Succeeded by: George Henry Williams

United States Attorney for Georgia
- In office 1869–1870
- President: Ulysses S. Grant

Personal details
- Born: Amos Tappan Akerman; February 23, 1821 Portsmouth, New Hampshire, U.S.
- Died: December 21, 1880 (aged 59) Cartersville, Georgia, U.S.
- Resting place: Oak Hill Cemetery (Cartersville, Georgia)
- Party: Whig (before 1860); Republican (1865–1880)
- Spouse: Martha Galloway
- Education: Dartmouth College (BA)

Military service
- Allegiance: Confederate States
- Branch/service: Confederate Army
- Years of service: 1863–1865
- Rank: Colonel
- Battles/wars: American Civil War: Battle of Atlanta

Amos Tappan Akerman (February 23, 1821 – December 21, 1880) was an American politician who served as United States Attorney General under President Ulysses S. Grant from 1870 to 1871.

A native of New Hampshire, Akerman graduated from Dartmouth College in 1842 and moved South, where he spent most of his career. He first worked as headmaster of a school in North Carolina and as a tutor in Georgia. Having become interested in law, Akerman studied and passed the bar in Georgia in 1850; where he and an associate set up a law practice. He also owned a farm and enslaved eleven people. When the American Civil War broke out in 1861, Akerman joined the Confederate Army, where he achieved the rank of colonel.

After the end of the war in 1865, Akerman joined the Republican Party during Reconstruction. He became an outspoken attorney advocate for freedmen's civil rights in Georgia. Akerman was appointed by President Ulysses S. Grant as his U.S. Attorney General; with Grant's support, he vigorously prosecuted the Ku Klux Klan under the Enforcement Acts. Akerman was assisted by Solicitor General Benjamin Bristow in the newly established Department of Justice. Attorney General Akerman also prosecuted important land grant cases that concerned railroads in a rapidly expanding West. Akerman advised on the United States first federal Civil Service Reform law implemented by President Grant and the U.S. Congress. Possibly due to Akerman's rulings against the Union Pacific Railroad, Grant asked for Akerman's resignation from the cabinet. Although Akerman left office at Grant's request, he continued to support Grant. He returned to Georgia, practiced law, and remained highly popular in the state.

== Early years ==
Akerman was born on February 23, 1821, in Portsmouth, New Hampshire, as the ninth of twelve children of Benjamin Akerman and his wife. He attended Phillips Exeter Academy and Dartmouth College, located in Hanover, where he graduated in the class of 1842 with Phi Beta Kappa honors.

== Headmaster, farmer, and law practice ==
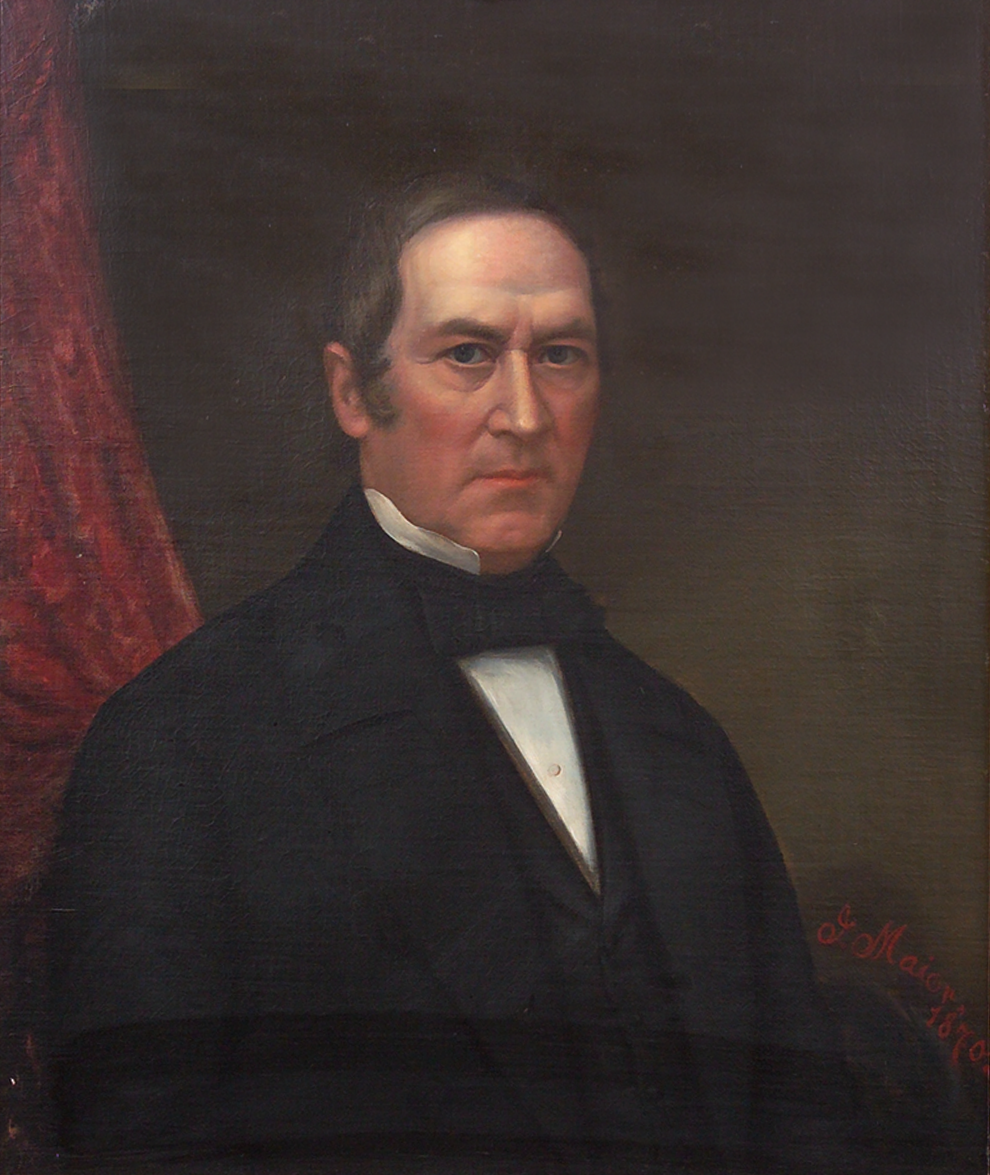
John Macpherson Berrien

Upon graduation, Akerman moved South where the climate was thought better for his lung condition. He quickly got a job as a headmaster/instructor of a boy's academy in Murfreesboro, North Carolina, at that time part of Richmond county. Akerman was known as a strict teacher. In 1846, he was hired by planter John Macpherson Berrien as a tutor for his children in Savannah, Georgia. Berrien had been President Andrew Jackson's Attorney General and was a prominent Whig. Akerman took advantage of Berrien's extensive law library and became fascinated with the field. Akerman passed the Georgia Bar in 1850, and moved to Peoria, Illinois, where his sister resided, and briefly practiced law. Akerman returned to Georgia and practiced law in Clarksville.

Akerman returned to Georgia, where he opened a law practice in Elberton, with Robert Heston. In addition to practicing law, Akerman also farmed and enslaved eleven people. In terms of politics Akerman was a Whig.

== American Civil War ==
Although he was against secession as a solution to the North–South conflicts, Akerman was loyal to his adopted state. At age 43, he joined the Confederate States Army in the spring of 1864. Akerman first served in General Robert Toombs' brigade and later in the quartermaster's department where it was his job to procure and dispense uniforms, weapons and other supplies to the soldiers. Akerman was put into active service against the Union during Sherman's 1864 march through Georgia.

== Reconstruction ==
Akerman joined the Republican Party in the campaign for freedmen's citizenship and suffrage. He was an outspoken proponent of Reconstruction as a member of Georgia's 1868 state constitutional convention and when appointed as U.S. district attorney for Georgia (1869). His appointment was blocked for some time by Congress, since he had served in the Confederate army. Akerman served for a total period of six months in this position. Akerman also strongly advocated Georgia's readmission into the Union and struggled to gain stability and federal compliance in the state.

== United States Presidential election 1868 ==
During the 1868 Presidential campaign, there was concern that Akerman supported presidential candidate Horatio Seymour over Grant. To stop the rumor, in a letter from Elberton, Akerman published his full endorsement for Ulysses S. Grant. He served as the Republican presidential state elector from Georgia. Akerman believed Grant would restore order and peace to the violence-plagued South. Akerman believed Grant would respect the "rights of the laborer as a freeman, citizen and voter". Akerman wrote that violence in the South against blacks was motivated by revenge after the white Southerners had been defeated by the North, lost substantial property in the emancipation of slaves, had their society disrupted, and were temporarily disenfranchised. Akerman believed that Congressional Reconstruction had been the better plan for the Southern states, opposed to President Andrew Johnson's plan. He believed that freedmen deserved federal protection from the law and he endorsed the enfranchisement of their men. Akerman admitted he was initially strongly opposed to blacks voting; however, his opinion changed as he came to believe that this was the only way that blacks could gain political power and protection.

== United States Attorney Georgia 1869 ==
In 1869 President Grant appointed Akerman as U.S. Attorney in Georgia. President Grant, initially, attempted to protect African American voters against white violence and discrimination by the use of State courts.

=== White vs. Clement ===
In June 1869, Akerman argued in defense of Richard W. White, a mulatto who had won the state election for Superior Court county clerk. White's opponent, William James Clement, represented by Solicitor General Alfred B. Smith of the Eastern Georgia Circuit court, said that White was ineligible to hold office since he was a black man. A lower court had ruled that if Clement could prove that White was a black man, he could not hold office. The case went to the Georgia's Supreme Court where Akerman defended White's election and said his color did not deny him the right to hold office. Akerman argued that the former laws, based in the South's slave society, did not apply anymore. The Reconstruction Act of 1867 stated that Georgia had no current civilian government. Akerman argued that since blacks had been granted the franchise throughout the United States, they had the right to hold public office. He argued that blacks had participated in the Georgia's new constitutional government in 1868 without distinction of color. He also noted that both President Andrew Johnson and Ulysses S. Grant had appointed black men to public office and that the current U.S. Constitution did not recognize or discriminate on the basis of a person's color. The Supreme Court reversed the lower court's decision, ruling that White had the right to hold public office regardless of his race.

== United States Attorney General ==
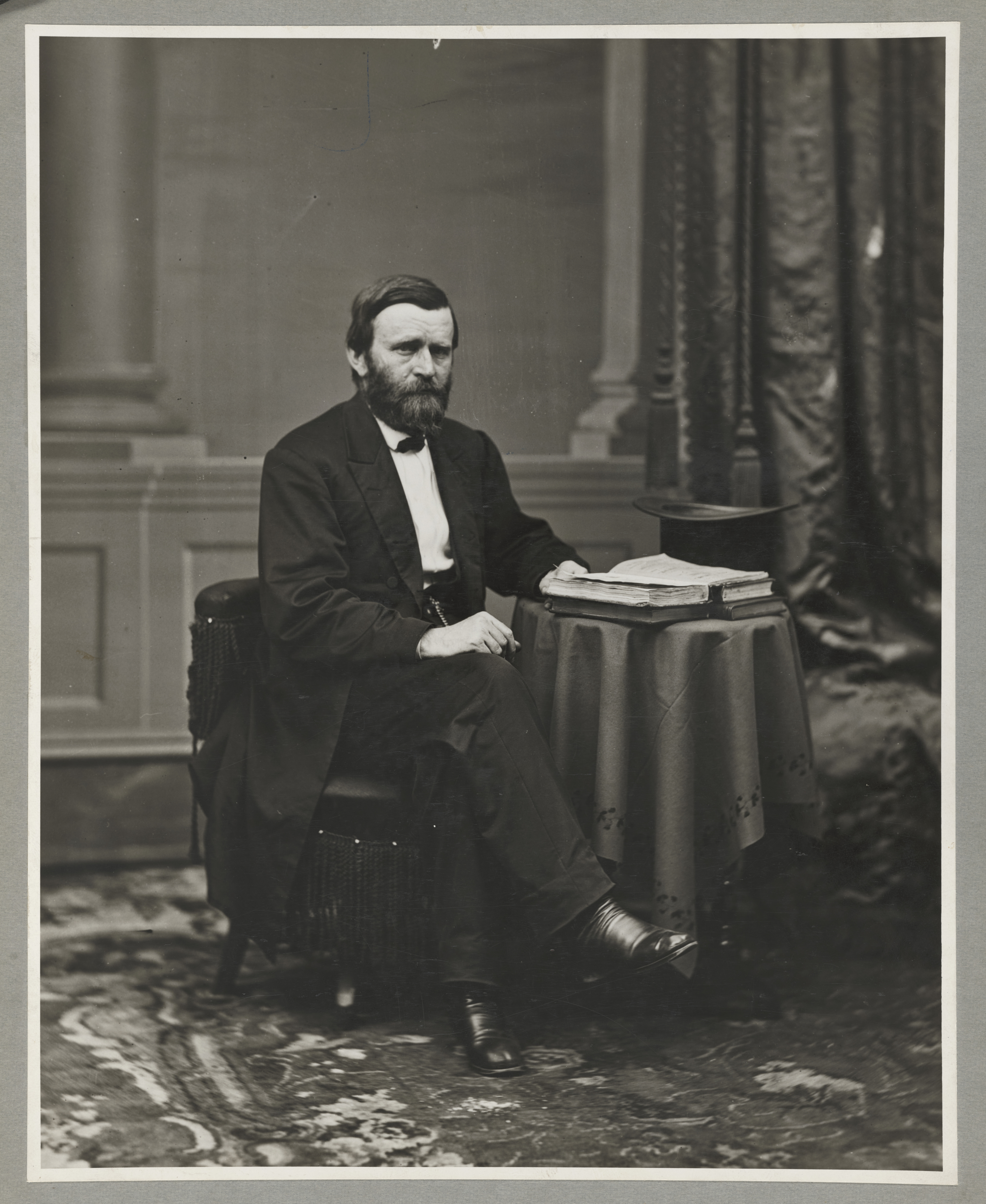
President Ulysses S. Grant Brady 1869

On June 17, 1870, Grant selected Akerman as United States Attorney General. Akerman was the "only person from the Confederacy to reach cabinet rank during Reconstruction". Having become attorney general shortly after the creation of the new Justice Department, Akerman dealt with legal issues from the Department of the Interior, such as the question of whether competing railroad companies deserved more land in the West in return for expanding the country's transportation system. He also dealt with the Crédit Mobilier of America scandal. He led enforcement efforts to suppress the Ku Klux Klan (KKK) in the South through litigation. He had experienced its violence first-hand. He oversaw prosecution of more than 1100 cases against KKK members, gaining convictions.

Akerman did not create the Department of Justice, but he helped play a pivotal role in its development. He helped to appoint members and set standards, but due to the geographical constraints, past laws, and financial restrictions he struggled to properly build a strong Department of Justice.

Akerman resigned on December 13, 1871.

=== Ruled against Union Pacific ===
On July 1, 1862, President Lincoln signed into law the Pacific Railroad Act that in addition to promoting the transcontinental railroad allowed the Union Pacific Railroad to make subsidiary railroad branch lines, including one through Kansas. One of these subsidiaries was financially unable to complete the railroad through Kansas, as a result, the Union Pacific applied for federal assistance in the form of land grants and bonds. On June 1, 1871, Attorney General Akerman denied land grants and bonds to the Union Pacific and upheld previous rulings against federal assistance. Company attorneys lobbied Akerman to change his mind, however, he refused to change his ruling. This upset Collis P. Huntington and Jay Gould, who were connected to the Union Pacific Railroad and demanded Akerman's removal from office.

=== Ruled on Civil Service Law ===
On September 7, 1871, Att. Gen. Akerman ruled on the newly formed Civil Service Commission passed by Congress on March 3, 1871, and signed into law by President Grant on March 4. In the United States first ever Civil Service Reform legislation a commission was set up to establish rules, testing, and regulations, authorized by the President, for the best possible candidates to be appointed civil service positions. The funding for the Commission only lasted for one year until June 30, 1872. Akerman ruled that the commission, run by a chairman appointed by the President, was legal, since Congress and the President had every right in their constitutional power to put in the best candidates to serve in the United States Government. Akerman believed this was the original intent of the framers of the U.S. Constitution. Akerman, however, ruled that the Commission did not constitutionally have the power to forbid an appointment; only to aid the President and Congress to put in the best person qualified for the job. Akerman also ruled that the competitive testing need not be overly restrictive as to take away the appointment powers given to the President and Congress under the U.S. Constitution.

=== Prosecuted Klan ===
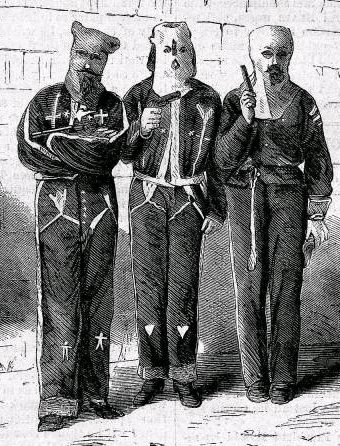
Ku Klux Klan members were prosecuted for violent attacks by U.S. Att. Gen. Amos T. Akerman. This shows three Mississippi Klan members arrested in September 1871.

Having lived in Georgia, Att. Gen. Akerman was well aware of the widespread violent tactics, known as "outrages" of the Ku Klux Klan, conducted primarily against African American voters, who had mostly registered as Republicans. The Freedman's Bureau in the Deep South were sent hundreds of complaints by blacks who had been persecuted and attacked by whites. One United States attorney of later years characterized this Klan activity as "the worst outbreak of domestic violence in American history to date." Upon his assumption to office, Akerman's primary duty was to stop the violence against blacks in the South and prosecute the perpetrators. His appointment by Grant in November 1870 was well timed, as he gained the strong enforcement powers of the newly created U.S. Department of Justice and the assistance of the newly created office of the U.S. Solicitor General. Having the Department of Justice and the first Solicitor General, Benjamin Bristow, Attorney General Akerman was ready to federally prosecute the Klan. Akerman, expanding the powers of the Department of Justice, started an investigating division that looked into the organization of the Klan in the South. Congress passed the Ku Klux Klan Act, and it was signed into law by President Grant on April 20, 1871.

Akerman and Bristow acted quickly and efficiently. After Grant had suspended habeas corpus in nine South Carolina counties on October 17, 1871, Akerman, who had traveled to the state, personally led U.S. Marshals and the U.S. Army into the countryside and made hundreds of arrests, while 2000 Klansmen fled the state. With the assistance of Bristow, the Department of Justice indicted 3,000 Klansmen throughout the South, and gained convictions of 600. Sixty-five of the Klansmen convicted were sentenced to federal prison for five years. As a result of the government's enforcement of the law against the Klan, its incidents of violence declined markedly. In 1872, African Americans voted in high numbers, electing numerous Republicans to state and local offices. White conservative Democrats continued to contest the elections, and there was violence related to a disputed gubernatorial election in Louisiana.

=== Resignation controversy ===
During December, while Akerman was busy prosecuting the Klan, he was unexpectedly asked to resign by President Grant. Rumor was that Grant was pressured by Secretary of Interior Columbus Delano, who sympathized with railroad tycoons Collis P. Huntington and Jay Gould, and had demanded Akerman's resignation. Akerman had ruled against the government's giving federal land grants and government bonds to the Union Pacific Railroad. Akerman denied that Delano was the reason for his departure from office.

William S. McFeely, author of a critical biography of Grant, wrote that Grant was uneasy concerning Akerman's prosecution zeal against the Klan and did not want to appear as a military dictator grinding the South into submission. According to McFeely, with Akerman's resignation "went any hope that the Republican party would develop as a national party of true racial equality". However, historian Eric Foner noted that Akerman's replacement, George H. Williams, continued to prosecute the Klan in the South. After Akerman resigned, he did not have any hard feelings towards President Grant. Akerman supported Grant's renomination in 1872 and believed that the president would continue to enforce anti-terrorist laws.

== Return to Georgia and death ==
Although he was offered another government job, he returned to Georgia, where he continued to practice law until his death in Cartersville, on December 21, 1880. He was interred at Oak Hill Cemetery in the city.

== Family ==
Days before he entered active Confederate Army service in 1864 during the American Civil War, Akerman married Martha Rebecca Galloway. The couple had eight children; one child died before adulthood. Their son Alexander Akerman was a Judge on the United States District Court for the Southern District of Florida from 1929 to 1948.

== Honors and historical recognition ==
=== Cartersville's Oak Hill Akerman monument ===
An Akerman monument was placed at Akerman's gravesite in Cartersville's Oak Hill Cemetery.

==== Akerman monument text ====
In Thought Clear And Strong,

In Purpose Pure And Elevated,

In Moral Courage Invincible,

He Lived Loyal To His Convictions

Avouring Them With Candor,

And Supporting Them With Firmness.

A Friend Of Humanity,

In His Zeal To Serve Others,

He Shrank From No Peril To Himself,

He Was Able, Faithful, True!

These are very intriguing words left by a loving family.

=== Cartersville marker (2019) ===
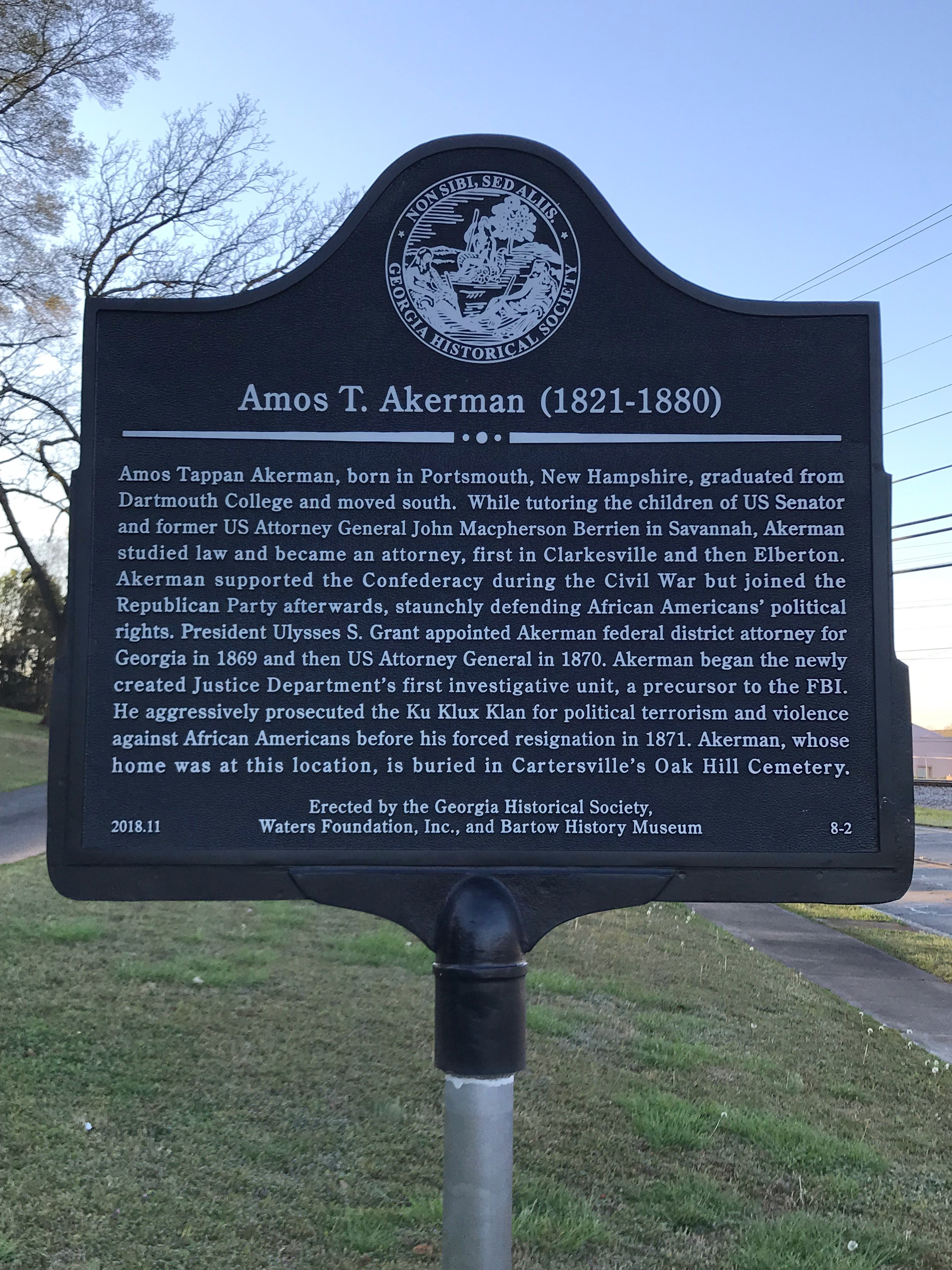
In 2019, a new historical marker recognizing Amos T. Akerman was dedicated in Cartersville, Georgia. The marker was erected by the Georgia Historical Society, in conjunction with the Waters Foundation, Inc., and the Bartow History Museum.

On March 28, 2019, the Georgia Historical Society erected a historical marker about Akerman in Cartersville at the site of his former home. The marker commemorated his career as both teacher and attorney, including his prosecution of the Ku Klux Klan during Reconstruction. The marker states:

Amos Tappan Akerman, born in Portsmouth, New Hampshire, graduated from Dartmouth College and moved south. While Tutoring the children of U.S. Senator and former U.S. Attorney General John Macpherson Berrien in Savannah, Akerman studied law and became an attorney, first in Clarkesville and then Elberton. Akerman supported the Confederacy during the American Civil War but joined the Republican Party afterwards, staunchly defending African Americans’ political rights. President Ulysses S. Grant appointed Akerman federal district attorney for Georgia in 1869 and then U.S. Attorney General in 1870. Akerman began the newly created Justice Department’s first investigative unit, a precursor to the F.B.I. He aggressively prosecuted the Ku Klux Klan for political terrorism and violence against African Americans before his forced resignation in 1871. Akerman, whose home was at this location, is buried in Cartersville’s Oak Hill Cemetery.

== Sources ==
- "Biography: Amos T. Akerman". Dept. of Justice. Government Printing Office. Archived from the original on March 9, 2006.
- William S. McFeely, Grant: A Biography (1997) ISBN 978-0945707158
- William S. McFeely, "Amos T. Akerman: The Lawyer and Racial Justice", in Region, Race, and Reconstruction: Essays in Honor of C. Vann Woodward, ed. J. Morgan Kousser and James M. McPherson (1982) ISBN 978-0195030754
- Jean Edward Smith, Grant, 2001, New York: Simon & Schuster. ISBN 0-684-84927-5
- Trelease, Allen W. "Akerman, Amos Tappan" in American National Biography Online Feb. 2000.
- Trelease, Allen W. White Terror: The Ku Klux Klan Conspiracy and Southern Reconstruction (1971) ISBN 978-0061317316

Legal offices
Preceded by Ebenezer R. Hoar	U.S. Attorney General; Served under: Ulysses S. Grant; November 23, 1870 – December 13, 1871	Succeeded by George H. Williams
