= Rolando Viera =

Cuban-born, left-handed baseball pitcher (born 1973)

- Pitcher
- Born: August 1, 1973 (age 52); Havana, Cuba
- Bats: Left Throws: Left
- Stats at Baseball Reference

Rolando Viera (born August 1, 1973) is a Cuban-born, left-handed baseball pitcher who unsuccessfully sued Major League Baseball to challenge its draft procedures for Cuban players. Viera signed with the Boston Red Sox and played for its minor league affiliates before being released.

== Background ==
Viera first pitched for Industriales in Havana, Cuba, in 1993. He missed the 1994 and 1995 seasons due to hepatitis. In his last two seasons, he achieved an 18-10 record and a 3.12 earned run average. He was suspended for the 2000 season by Cuban officials after his wife, Lorraine, applied for a visa for him to the United States without his knowledge. The two subsequently divorced and Viera remarried. After receiving the visa, Viera came to the U.S. on April 25, 2001 and began working in Tampa, Florida. He had initially left his young son, Rolando Viera, Jr., behind with Lorraine in Cuba, and attempted to bring his second wife to the U.S. After Lorraine secured a U.S. visa in a lottery and travelled to Miami with their son, Viera instead divorced his second wife and remarried Lorraine.

== MLB lawsuit ==
According to MLB rules, Cuban players were subject to the draft unless they signed with an MLB team while residing outside of the U.S., Puerto Rico, or Canada. Wishing to be instead treated as a free agent, Viera, represented by attorney Alan Gura and agent Joe Kehoskie, filed the first lawsuit by a player ever to challenge the baseball draft, in the United States District Court for the Middle District of Florida, and argued that the MLB draft rules were discriminatory. His request for an injunction was denied by Judge James D. Whittemore on June 4, 2021, who ruled that Viera could not meet the federal injunction standard because inclusion in the draft would not cause him to suffer irreparable harm.

== Playing record ==
Viera became a seventh-round draft pick of the Boston Red Sox the same week; at 27, he was the oldest player in the draft that year. One Red Sox spokesman called the selection "a gamble" because no one from the team had yet seen him pitch; all they knew was that Viera had a winning record with Industriales and was left-handed. He signed a minor league contract with the team that gave him a $175,000 signing bonus and guaranteed him a Triple-A level salary despite the fact that he would be starting out as a Class-A player.

After signing with the Red Sox, Viera had a falling out with his agent, reportedly due to Viera's reluctance to pay any of the agent's fees or the costs of the lawsuit. Viera's trainer raised similar allegations against him, stating that Viera had failed to fully compensate him for the costs he had incurred on his behalf.

Viera started with the Trenton Thunder, the Double-A affiliate of the Red Sox, in the 2002 season. He was promoted midseason to the Triple-A Pawtucket Red Sox. His season began strong but his performance dipped towards the end, which he and the Red Sox international scouting coordinator attributed to his need to adjust to the more intensive American training schedule, particularly since Viera had missed a year playing. Due to his disappointing performance, the Red Sox released Viera from his contract after 2002, giving him the free agent status he wanted in the first place. Viera then played for the unaffiliated Newark Bears in the 2003 and 2004 seasons.

Viera subsequently played for the Elmira Pioneers—a team in the Canadian-American Association of Professional Baseball—and was recognized for player of the week two weeks after he had joined the league. He also played for the York Revolution of the Atlantic League of Professional Baseball.

== Sources ==
- "Cuban Player Denied Free Agency", by Amy Armond. Mark's Sports Law News, June 6, 2001.
- "Red Sox Draft Rolando Viera", by Jimmy Golen, Associated Press Sports Writer. Yahoo! Cuba News, June 6, 2001.
- "Cuban defector comes to contract terms with Red Sox", by Tom Farrey and Wilie Weinbaum. ESPN.com, July 30, 2001.
- "Viera starts over again", by Tom Farrey. ESPN.com, November 11, 2002.
