= James D. Whittemore =

American judge (born 1952)

James David Whittemore
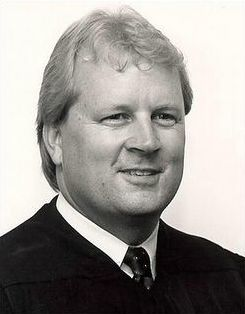

Senior Judge of the United States District Court for the Middle District of Florida
- Incumbent
- Assumed office August 29, 2017

Judge of the United States District Court for the Middle District of Florida
- In office May 25, 2000 – August 29, 2017
- Appointed by: Bill Clinton
- Preceded by: William Terrell Hodges
- Succeeded by: Thomas Barber

Judge of the Hillsborough County Circuit Court for the Thirteenth Judicial Circuit of Florida
- In office 1990–2000

Personal details
- Born: James David Whittemore; August 29, 1952 (age 73) Walterboro, South Carolina, U.S.
- Spouse: Martha K. Watford
- Education: University of Florida (BSBA); Stetson University (JD)

James David Whittemore (born August 29, 1952) is a senior United States district judge serving in the Tampa division of the United States District Court for the Middle District of Florida. He was previously a Florida state trial court judge, a federal public defender, and an attorney in private practice who won a criminal case before the United States Supreme Court. As a federal judge, Whittemore presided over a number of high-profile cases, including a lawsuit against Major League Baseball to challenge its draft procedure, and the Terri Schiavo case, after the United States Congress had specifically given the Middle District of Florida jurisdiction to hear the seven-year-long fight over whether the brain-damaged Schiavo should be taken off life support.

== Background and early legal career ==
Whittemore was born in Walterboro, South Carolina. He graduated with honors from the University of Florida in 1974 with a Bachelor of Science in Business Administration degree, and then received his Juris Doctor from Stetson University Law School in 1977. He briefly worked at Bauer, Morlan & Wells, a small law firm in St. Petersburg, Florida, before becoming one of the original four federal public defenders in the Middle District of Florida in 1978. Whittemore returned to private practice in Tampa three years later as an associate at Whittemore & Seybold, and then at Whittemore & Campbell from 1982 until 1987. In 1985, Whittemore successfully argued before the United States Supreme Court in Wainwright v. Greenfield, 474 U.S. 284 (1986), that a criminal suspect's silence after he received the Miranda warning could not be used at trial to discredit his insanity defense. Whittemore's client had been convicted of sexual battery; the Court's ruling secured him a new trial. From 1987 until 1990, Whittemore was a sole practitioner in Tampa.

== Judicial career ==
=== State judicial service ===
In 1990, Whittemore was elected to the bench of the Hillsborough County Circuit Court in the Florida Thirteenth Judicial Circuit, and remained on the court until 2000. He was named the 1998 Jurist of the Year by the Hillsborough County Bar Association, and Outstanding Jurist of 1999 by the Florida Bar's Young Lawyers Division.

=== Federal judicial service ===
After recommendation by both of Florida's United States Senators, Democrat Bob Graham and Republican Connie Mack III, he was nominated by President Bill Clinton to a new seat (Note: Whittemore was appointed to a new seat that was one of four created in the Middle District of Florida by Sec. 309 of 113 Stat. 1501; 106 P.L. 113, enacted November 29, 1999. Some online and media sources erroneously reported that he replaced the "retiring" Judge William Terrell Hodges. Hodges did not retire, however, but instead assumed senior status on May 2, 1999, and as of 2017 remains active on the court in the Ocala Division.) in the Florida Middle District Court on October 20, 1999. Whittemore was confirmed unanimously by the United States Senate on May 24, 2000, and received his commission the following day. He assumed senior status on August 29, 2017.

== Notable cases ==
On June 4, 2001, Whittemore ruled against Rolando Viera, a Cuban baseball pitcher who was attempting to enjoin Major League Baseball from including him in its amateur draft so that he could instead be a free agent. Viera, represented by attorney Alan Gura and agent Joe Kehoskie, had claimed that the MLB draft was discriminatory because it had a different residency requirement for Cubans, but Whittemore decided that whatever financial loss Viera suffered from being subject to the draft did not satisfy the federal injunction requirement of irreparable harm. Viera was picked by the Boston Red Sox that same week in the seventh round of the draft.

Whittemore presided over the criminal trial of Gerald and Betty Payne, the founders of Greater Ministries International Church. Over $450 million was bilked from church followers in the Paynes' fraudulent investment scheme, which was billed as one of the largest Ponzi schemes in United States history. Whittemore sentenced Gerald to 27 years for conduct he called "absolutely despicable." Betty was sentenced to over 12 years, which was increased from what Whittemore initially considered after she repeated a claim they were the innocent victims of government persecution and their religious freedoms were being violated. "It's one thing to have blind faith," Whittemore told her. "It's quite another to cast yourself as a martyr for no apparent good. I just deliberated a matter that you could serve 33 months less. What you've just done is throw that right back in my face."

=== Schiavo ex rel. Schindler v. Schiavo ===
Whittemore was randomly assigned to hear the Terri Schiavo case, a longstanding conflict between Schiavo's husband, Michael Schiavo, and her parents, Robert and Mary Schindler, over whether she should be removed from life support. The Schindlers disputed that their daughter was in a persistent vegetative state or that she would have wanted to have life support withdrawn, but Schiavo, his expert witnesses, and court-appointed physicians had successfully argued the contrary before Florida trial court judge, George Greer. The case had worked its way through Florida state courts since 1998, was denied review four times by the United States Supreme Court, and was unsuccessfully challenged by the Florida Legislature before Schiavo's feeding tube was ordered removed for the third time by Judge Greer. Shortly after midnight on March 21, 2005, the United States Congress passed an unprecedented law that gave the Middle District of Florida jurisdiction over the matter without any regard to previous state court decisions.

While protesters demonstrated outside his courthouse, Whittemore conducted a hearing on the Schindler's amended complaint (Note: The first complaint filed by the Schindlers was based on habeas corpus and was amended prior to the hearing.) the same day the law was passed, but adjourned without issuing any orders as Schiavo's feeding tube remained removed for the third day. On March 22, Whittemore issued a thirteen-page ruling that denied a temporary restraining order (TRO) to replace the tube. As appropriate for the federal standard of review for a TRO motion, his ruling avoided the issue of whether the Congressional grant of jurisdiction was unconstitutional, as Michael Schiavo and most legal scholars had argued. Though three of the four elements of the federal TRO standard, including irreparable harm, were clearly satisfied by Schiavo's imminent death, Whittemore did not believe the Schindlers ultimately had a substantial likelihood of prevailing, but instead found each of their claims "without merit." Because the due process and equal protection violations alleged in the Schindler's complaint were premised primarily on the procedures and orders in the Florida court proceedings, the state court history had to be considered by Whittemore despite the language of the congressional act, which called for a de novo review. Whittemore stated that the issues they raised had been "exhaustively litigated" and that Judge Greer had appropriately fulfilled his role as a judge under Florida and federal law. The Eleventh Circuit affirmed Whittemore's "carefully thought-out decision" in a 2-1 ruling on March 23, and denied rehearing en banc later the same day, 10–2. The United States Supreme Court also denied a stay without recorded dissent on March 24.

The Schindlers returned to Whittemore's courtroom, again amended their complaint to add claims based on the Americans with Disabilities Act of 1990 (ADA), the Rehabilitation Act of 1973, and the Eighth Amendment, and filed an amended motion for a TRO. Whittemore conducted a hearing on the motion the evening of March 24. When one of the Schindlers' attorneys described the removal of the feeding tube as "murder", Whittemore responded "[t]hat is the emotional rhetoric of this case. It does not influence this court and cannot influence this court. I want you to know it, and I want the public to know it." During the hearing, the protesters that still surrounded the area outside the courthouse were temporarily evacuated, so that law enforcement could detonate a suspicious bag that turned out to be harmless. The hearing proceeded inside without interruption, and lasted around four hours.

In an order issued the morning of March 25, Whittemore denied the Schindlers' amended motion. Regarding their ADA claim, Whittemore wrote that the law was inapplicable because Mr. Schiavo and the hospice in care of Terri Schiavo did not fall under the Act's definition of "public entities", nor was the withdrawal of the feeding tube based on discrimination against Schiavo on the basis of her disability. Their claim under the Rehabilitation Act of 1973 was similarly flawed, in that no discrimination was present, and the United States Supreme Court had previously ruled that the Act did not apply to medical decisions. Their Eighth Amendment claim was also rejected by Whittemore, because the amendment's prohibition on cruel and unusual punishment did not apply outside of criminal sanctions. Whittemore closed his order by conveying the court's "appreciation for the difficulties and heartbreak the parties have endured through this lengthy process." A panel of the same three Circuit judges who heard the first appeal affirmed his decision once again on March 25, with the judge who had previously dissented concurring in this second opinion. Rehearing was once again denied by the Eleventh Circuit on March 30, and the Supreme Court also once again denied a stay the same day. The case ended with Schiavo's death on the morning of March 31.

== Sources ==
- Judge in Schiavo case a Clinton appointee, by Vickie Chachere, Associated Press. ABC News, March 21, 2005. A profile of the judge and his record.
- Cuban pitcher denied request for free agency, by Fred Goodall, Associated Press. USA Today, June 5, 2001.
- Church Founders Handed Penalties, by Michael Fletcher. Tampa Tribune, August 7, 2001.

Schiavo ex rel. Schindler v. Schiavo

- Judge Hears Schiavo Arguments, but Does Not Rule Yet, by Carl Hulse and Maria Newman. New York Times, March 21, 2005.
- Judge Refuses to Intervene in Schiavo Case, by Manuel Roig-Franzia and William Branigin. Washington Post, March 22, 2005.
- Judge Whittemore's March 22, 2005 order denying motion for a Temporary Restraining Order
- Judge Denies Latest Appeal in Schiavo Case, by Manuel Roig-Franzia. Washington Post, March 25, 2005.
- Judge Whittemore's March 25, 2005 order denying amended motion for a Temporary Restraining Order

Legal offices
Preceded by William Terrell Hodges	Judge of the United States District Court for the Middle District of Florida; 2000–2017	Succeeded by Thomas Barber
