= James E. Keezel =

American politician

Member of the Florida House of Representatives from Orange County
- In office 1953

Personal details
- Born: December 7, 1907 Culver, Kansas, U.S.
- Died: June 17, 1966 (aged 58)
- Party: Democratic
- Education: University of Florida

James E. Keezel (December 7, 1907 – June 17, 1966), nicknamed "Pee Wee", was an American politician. He served as a Democratic member of the Florida House of Representatives.

== Life and career ==
Keezel was born in Culver, Kansas. He attended the University of Florida.

Keezel served in the Florida House of Representatives in 1953.

Keezel died on June 17, 1966, at the age of 58.
