= Burton Thornal =

American politician

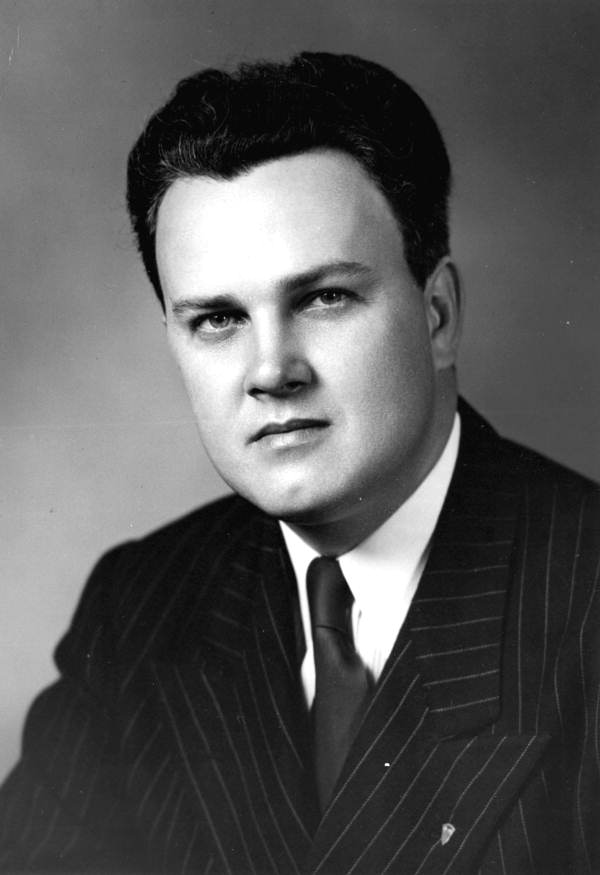
- Thornal in 1949

Member of the Florida House of Representatives from Orange County
- In office 1948–1950

Personal details
- Born: June 23, 1917 Charleston, South Carolina, U.S.
- Died: January 10, 2011 (aged 93)
- Party: Democratic
- Education: University of Florida

Burton Thornal (June 23, 1917 – January 10, 2011) was an American politician. He served as a Democratic member of the Florida House of Representatives.

== Life and career ==
Thornal was born in Charleston, South Carolina. He attended the University of Florida.

Thornal served in the Florida House of Representatives from 1948 to 1950.

Thornal died on January 10, 2011, at the age of 93.
