= Akerman LLP =

American law firm

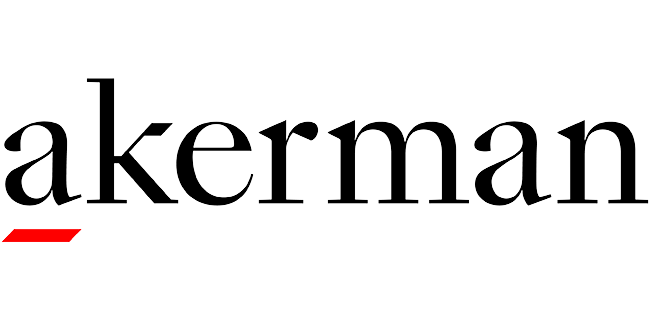
- Headquarters: U.S.
- No. of attorneys: More than 700
- Major practice areas: General practice
- Key people: Scott Meyers, Chairman and CEO
- Date founded: 1920
- Founder: Alexander Akerman and John Moses Cheney
- Company type: Limited liability partnership
- Website: Akerman.com

Akerman is a United States–based law firm. It is among the 100 largest firms in the United States, according to rankings by The American Lawyer. The firm has offices across the United States and approximately 700 lawyers, with its largest office in New York City. The firm is ranked among the top practices in the United States by Chambers USA, The Legal 500, Benchmark Litigation, and U.S. News-Best Lawyers.

== History ==
Akerman was founded in 1920; it was formerly known as Akerman Senterfitt LLP and changed its name to Akerman LLP in 2013. It was founded by former United States District Court Judges John Moses Cheney and Alexander Akerman as Cheney & Akerman, with offices in Orlando, Florida.

Five years after its founding, in 1925, Alexander Akerman partnered with Hugh Akerman as Akerman & Akerman after Cheney died. In 1936, Hugh Akerman and Billy Dial, formed a partnership with William Akerman (Akerman, Dial & Akerman). George T. Eidson and American Bankers Association President Donald T. Senterfitt later became named partners and played significant roles in the firm's growth and success from the 1950s through the 1980s.
