= Carlton Fields =

American law firm

Carlton Fields, P.A.
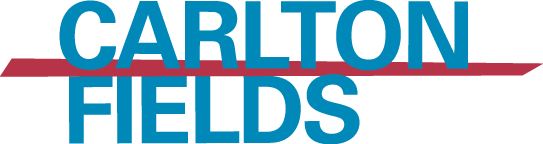
- Headquarters: Tampa, Florida
- No. of offices: 12
- No. of attorneys: 350
- Key people: Gary L. Sasso (President and CEO)
- Date founded: 1901
- Website: Official website

Carlton Fields, P.A. (known as Carlton Fields) is an American full-service law firm headquartered in Tampa, Florida. The firm serves a broad client base throughout multiple major U.S. markets, maintaining offices in California, Connecticut, Florida, Georgia, Minnesota, New Jersey, New York, and Washington, D.C.

The firm was founded in 1901 by Giddings Mabry, son of Florida Supreme Court Chief Justice Milton Mabry, and Doyle E. Carlton, who later served as Governor of Florida.

Carlton Fields has practices spanning litigation, class action defense, corporate and business transactions, real estate, construction, insurance, health care, intellectual property, labor and employment, cybersecurity and data privacy, white-collar defense, and government consulting.
