= Women's Museum =

Women's Museum may refer to:

- Bonn Women's Museum, Bonn, Germany
- Hittisau Women's Museum, Hittisau, Austria
- International Museum of Women, San Francisco, California, United States
- İzmir Women Museum, İzmir, Turkey
- Museum of Women, museum scheduled to open in 2022 in Manhattan
- Museum van de Vrouw (Women's Museum), Echt, Netherlands
- National Museum of Women in the Arts, Washington, D.C., United States
- National Women's History Museum, Alexandria, Virginia, United States
- Smithsonian American Women's History Museum, Washington, D.C., United States
- Tandang Sora Women's Museum, Quezon City, Philippines
- United States Army Women's Museum, Fort Lee, Virginia, United States
- Women's Museum, Aarhus, Denmark
- The Women's Museum, Dallas, Texas, United States
- Women's Museum İstanbul, Istanbul, Turkey

== See also ==
- Women's Hall of Fame (disambiguation)
- East End Women's Museum, London, United Kingdom
