= Okaloosa County Women's Hall of Fame =

Hall of fame in Florida, United States

The Okaloosa County Women's Hall of Fame (OCWHOF) is a tribute to women who live or have lived in Okaloosa County, Florida. The Hall of Fame is meant to "recognize and honor women who have helped to improve the community," says Jeanette Debs, a chairwoman of the OCWHOF. The Hall of Fame is largely virtual, with the first physical display set up in 2006 at the Crestview courthouse. Photographs of past inductees are displayed in Crestview and in Niceville. Nominations are accepted from the public in several areas of endeavor.

The OCWHOF was founded in 1995 by the Okaloosa County Commission on the Status of Women (OCCSW). Gayle Melich, a women's rights activist, is considered one of the "Founding Mothers" of the Hall of Fame. Bobelle Sconiers Harrell is one well-known inductee of the OCWHOF.

== 1995 ==
- Ruth Lovejoy
- Sarah Frances Brooks Pryor (1877–1972)
- Addie Lewis
- Dr. Fanny Fern Davis
- Gertrude L'Abbe
- Clair Eken
- Liza Jackson

== 1996 ==
- Doris Berg
- Alice Starkey
- Margaret Gebauer

== 1997 ==
- Camilla Caley
- Christian LaRoche
- Soledad Bennes

== 1998 ==
- Ida Calhoun Burritt
- Rae Ruckle Byrne Williams

== 1999 ==
- Jane Briere
- Zoie Campbell
- Grace Brown
- Nancy Kenaston
- Dr. Mabel Jean Morrison (1927–2005)
- Carolyn Spencer
- Willie Mae Taylor (1914–1999)

== 2000 ==
- Catherine Pierce Berridge
- Shirley Ginzburg
- Mary V. Jones
- Celeste Mapoles (1889–1977)
- Susan Myers
- Pearl Tyner
- Marilyn Joan Young

== 2001 ==
- Caroline Allen
- Gladys Nichols Milton (1924–1999)
- Jane Strickland
- Marnie Tate

== 2002 ==
- Kate Bagley (1914–1994)
- Dr. Diane Barlar
- Agnes Catherine Gerlach (1884–1974)
- Donna Kelly
- Mattie Mae Kelly (1912–1992)

== 2003 ==
- Iris Baughman (1908–2003)
- Ursel Behnken
- Terry Bevino
- Fritz Creswell
- Jessie Alma Edge (1900–1998)
- Paulette Risher

== 2004 ==
- Eileen Arpke
- Lillian Rose Brodeur
- Annette Edwins
- Rachel Godwin
- Jeanette Henderson
- Pat Hollarn

== 2005 ==
- Virginia Glynn Barr
- Peggy May
- Gayle Melich (1937–2005)
- Judy Byrne Riley

== 2006 ==
- Dr. Jennifer Fortune
- Susan Kneller
- Dr. Pamela Meadows
- Jeanne Rief
- Bernadette Sims

== 2007 ==
- Inez Bailey Hall
- Elizabeth Betty Kentosh
- Marty Lackey
- Bettie Robertson (1917–2007)
- Barbara J. Wall

== 2008 ==
- Linda Powell Parker
- Champee Kemp
- Nellie Bogar

== 2009 ==
- Sharlene Cox
- Jean Dutton
- Yvonne Franklin
- Mitzi Prince Henley
- Joyce Sanders
- Lenore Wilson

== 2010 ==
- Doris Day
- Karen Lauer
- Martha Miller

== 2011 ==
- Donna Miller
- Eddie Mae Owens

== 2012 ==
- Mary Stevenson
- Judy Wiseman
- Jean Woo

== 2013 ==
- Mary Burnette
- Rogene Anchors Hasty (1924–2017)
- Sarah "Sam" Seevers

== 2014 ==
- Bobelle Sconiers Harrell (1923–2012)
- Kelly Humphrey
- Aimee Shaffer
- Linda Sumblin

== 2015 ==
- Michelle Anchors
- Kathy Foster
- Lisa Jo Spencer
- Shawnea Tallman

== 2016 ==
- Linda Evanchyk
- Almut Flentge-Parker
- Shirley Piggott
- Alexis Tibbetts
- Elaine Tucker
- Mary Lou Reed

== 2017 ==
- Dr. Naomi Barnes
- Dr. Karyn Combs
- Evie Fox
- Tammy McDaniel
- Brenda Shoffner
- Nancy Weidenhamer (1944–2017)

== 2018 ==
- Dr. Vivian Green
- Carolyn Ketchel
- Gayle Norgaard
- Pam Woodall

== 2019 ==
- Barbara Britt
- Jill Lewis-Daggs
- Nellie Barrows Fleming (1925–2024)
- Kathi Heapy
- Caroline Maney

== 2020 ==
- Vickie Warner
- Bobbie Ponder
- Julie Cotton
- Vickie Edge (1961–2020)
- Teresa Halverson

== 2021 ==
- Carole Byrd
- Charlotte Eschmann
- Kathy Houchins
- Dr. Diane Kelley
- Ginger Bowden Madden
- Dr. Venita Morell
- Terri Harbeson Roberts
- Vicki Tarro

== 2022 ==
- Gloria Battle
- Dr. Elvira Chiccarelli
- Stacey Darhower
- Gloria Frazier
- Delores Noechel
- Julie Porterfield
- Col. Jocelyn Schermerhorn
- Sybil Smith Lebherz (–1993)
- Catherine "Cissy" Wyninegar

== 2023 ==
- Hon. Patricia Grinstead
- Col. Teresa W. Ryan
- Bonnie Barlow
- Cindy Frakes
- Lt. Betty Jo Hunter

== 2024 ==
- Sharon "Shari" Allen
- Col. Allison Black
- Hon. Lacey Powell Clark
- Shawna Crist
- Sierra Elliott
- Lori Kelley
- Joy Makela
- Barbara Henderson Slocumb

== 2025 ==
- Peggy Brockman
- Martha “Jenny” Hamilton (1943–2023)
- Sherry Harlow
- Helen Harris
- Kay Rasmussen
- Eloise Stevens
- Donna Tashik

== 2026 ==
- Megan Blanco
- Vanessa D'Aquin
- Simona Faroni
- Dr. Cristie Kedroski
- Christina Larson
- Heather Ruiz
- Dr. Linda Smith
- Dr. MiChele Stevenson
