= Women's Hall of Fame =

Women's Hall of Fame may refer to:

== Australian halls of fame ==
- National Pioneer Women's Hall of Fame
- Tasmanian Honour Roll of Women
- Victorian Honour Roll of Women

== Costa Rica ==
- La Galería de las Mujeres de Costa Rica

== Singapore halls of fame ==
- Singapore Women's Hall of Fame

== United States halls of fame ==
- National Women's Hall of Fame

=== By state ===
- Alabama Women's Hall of Fame
- Alaska Women's Hall of Fame
- Arizona Women's Hall of Fame
- Arkansas Women's Hall of Fame
- Colorado Women's Hall of Fame
- Connecticut Women's Hall of Fame
- Hall of Fame of Delaware Women
- Florida Women's Hall of Fame
- Georgia Women of Achievement
- Iowa Women's Hall of Fame
- Kentucky Women Remembered
- Louisiana Center for Women in Government and Business Hall of Fame
- Maine Women's Hall of Fame
- Maryland Women's Hall of Fame
- Michigan Women's Hall of Fame
- National Women's Hall of Fame
- New Jersey Women's Hall of Fame
- North Carolina Women's Hall of Fame
- Ohio Women's Hall of Fame
- Oklahoma Women's Hall of Fame
- Oregon Women of Achievement
- Rhode Island Heritage Hall of Fame Women Inductees
- Tennessee Women's Hall of Fame
- Texas Women's Hall of Fame
- Virginia Women in History

=== By locality ===
- Alameda County (California) Women's Hall of Fame
- Chicago Women's Hall of Fame
- D.C. Women's Hall of Fame
- El Paso Women's Hall of Fame
- Lebanon County (Pennsylvania) Women's Hall of Fame
- Okaloosa County Women's Hall of Fame
- San Diego County Women's Hall of Fame
- Savannah Women of Vision

== Halls of fame by topic ==
- Burlesque Hall of Fame
- International Women's Boxing Hall of Fame
- International Women's Sports Hall of Fame
- National Cowgirl Museum and Hall of Fame
- NEO Japan Ladies Pro-Wrestling Hall of Fame
- PWBA Hall of Fame
- Scottish Women in Sport Hall of Fame
- Women Divers Hall of Fame
- Women in Aviation International Pioneer Hall of Fame
- Women in Science Hall of Fame (U.S. State Department)
- List of Women in Technology International Hall of Fame inductees
- Women's Basketball Hall of Fame
- Women's Super League Hall of Fame
- Women's Wrestling Hall of Fame

== Others ==
- International Women's Forum
