= Crosslin =

Crosslin is a surname. Notable people with the surname include:

- Evelyn Stocking Crosslin (1919–1991), American physician
- Julius Crosslin (1983–2023), American football player
- Tom Crosslin (c. 1955–2001), marijuana activist killed by an FBI agent
