= Nikki Beare =

American feminist (1928–2014)

- Born: Muriel Nikki Brink; March 7, 1928; Detroit, Michigan, U.S.
- Died: November 10, 2014 (aged 86); Tallahassee, Florida, U.S.
- Education: Skidmore College (BA)
- Occupations: Activist, feminist, lobbyist, journalist
- Known for: Florida's National Organization for Women
- Spouse: Richard A. Beare (m. 1946)
- Children: 1
- Awards: Florida Women's Hall of Fame (1994)

Nikki Beare (March 7, 1928– November 10, 2014) was an American feminist, journalist, and lobbyist who served as president of Florida's National Organization for Women (NOW) chapter.

Beare began working as a journalist for The Miami News before fully committing to the fledgeling feminist movement in Florida. She was hired as a lobbyist by NOW in an effort to pass the Equal Rights Amendment and worked to fight instances of job and insurance discrimination. Beare was invited to the Third and Fourth World Conference on Women in 1985 and 1995.

She was inducted into the Florida Women's Hall of Fame in 1994.

== Early life ==
Muriel Nikki Brink was born on March 7, 1928, in Detroit, Michigan, as the only daughter of parents Stanley and Dorothy Brink. She also had one younger brother named Stanley Jr. Her father was a basketball player and her mother worked so she was raised by housekeepers. Growing up, she attended Noble Grade School, Tappan Intermediate, and Cass Technical High School. She graduated from Cass Technical High School in 1946 and married Richard A. Beare. Their daughter Sandra was born in 1947.

== Career ==
The family moved to Islamorada, a village in the Florida Keys, in 1956 where she wrote for the Key West Citizen newspaper before moving to Miami. In 1962, Beare published a book titled From turtle soup to coconuts; a gourmet guide to good eating and restaurants on the Florida Keys.

In 1968, Beare was inspired by American feminist Roxcy Bolton to help found the Florida chapter of National Organization for Women (NOW). While working as a Women’s Page reporter for the Miami News, Beare was elected vice-president of the Florida NOW. After leaving journalism to tackle feminism, she convinced The Miami Herald to eliminate the gendered newspaper classifieds sections. She was later named president of Florida's NOW chapter after Martha Ingle resigned. In 1970, Beare helped Gwen Cherry, Dade County’s first female black attorney, get elected to the Florida House of Representatives as well as helped Elaine Gordon get elected as a Democratic legislator from Dade County. As part of her job with NOW, Beare prepared workshops for women to educate them on how to lobby and interact with lawmakers.

In 1975, NOW hired Beare as a lobbyist to help pass the Equal Rights Amendment. She also began her own feminist newspaper titled "Women's Almanac" which ran from 1975 to 1985. That same year, Beare began her own public relations company called "Nikki Beare and Associates Inc.

In 1976, Beare worked with the Florida Insurance Task Force to fight against instances of discrimination based on gender. She teamed up with Gordon, now an established state legislator, to start a statewide feminist credit union. This was a response to banks refusing to loan money to young women on the basis of sex. She also worked with Gordon and Elaine Bloom, who also became a legislator, on WKAT Radio with a feminist radio show titled "Women's Powerline". In 1978, Beare served as Vice President of the Women's Business Council of Dade County and later she served on NOW's Advisory Board for the National Women's Political Caucus.

In 1980, Beare earned her Bachelor of Arts from Skidmore College where she focused on Women in Nineteenth Century American Culture. As a member of NOW in the 1980s, Beare helped form a Women's International News Service, and lobbied for women's rights such as childbirth or adoption unpaid leave. In 1985 and 1995, Beare was invited to the United Nations World Conference on Women. Starting in 1988, Beare worked as a lobbyist for the American Society of Travel Agents (ASTA) to fight against travel fraud.

In 1992, after Hurricane Andrew, she moved to Havana, Florida where she and her daughter Sandra were charter members of the Gadsden County Domestic and Sexual Violence Task Force. She also worked with Florida Attorney General Bob Butterworth on the Florida Commission on the Status of Women. In 1994, Beare was inducted into the Florida Women's Hall of Fame. The next year, she was elected vice president for policy planning in the Florida Women's Political Caucus. She further continued her activism work by serving as a chairwoman of the National Committee on Travel for Persons With Disabilities of ASTA. Through her work with ASTA, Beare helped introduce the Travel Agency Fair Treatment Act and lobbied to protect travel agent services from increased taxes. She also worked to end travel scamming. In 1996, Beare and Sandra opened an antique store and later a book shop. Her family also ran a Blueberry picking farm called "Beare’s Berries." However, in 2005, Beare returned to journalism and worked as the Gadsden County correspondent for the Tallahassee Democrat; a position she kept until 2011.

Beare died on November 10, 2014, in Tallahassee.

== Publications ==
List of publications:

- From turtle soup to coconuts; a gourmet guide to good eating and restaurants on the Florida Keys. (1962)
- Bottle bonanza: a handbook for glass collectors (1965)
- Pirates, pineapples, and people: a history, tales, and legends of the upper Florida Keys (1969)
