= Christine Fulwylie-Bankston =

American educator, poet, and activist (1916–1998)

Christine Boaz Jones Fulwylie-Bankston (January 16, 1916 – December 9, 1998) was an American educator, poet, publisher, and civil rights activist. She was inducted into the Florida Women's Hall of Fame in 1998.

== Early life ==
Christine Boaz was born in Paducah, Kentucky. In 1974, she completed doctoral studies at the University of Pittsburgh.

== Career ==
Fulwylie taught beginning in 1937. In 1959, she was director of the Phyllis Wheatley YWCA in Louisville, and part of the merger of the black and white branches of the YWCA in Kentucky. She was executive director of the Pittsburgh Negro Education Emergency Drive (NEED) in 1969. She moved to Florida in 1981, and started a tutoring program in Pensacola.

Books of poetry by Fulwylie include Steps to Free Worlds (1979), In Whom We Trust (1987), Different Colored Dreams (1994), and Her Share: A Chronicle of Relationships During the Growth of America (1998). She assisted in the writing of Beyond the Storm: An Extraordinary Journey (1997), a memoir by Florida midwife Gladys Nichols Milton, and co-edited the 1993 anthology, When Black Folks was Colored: A Collection of Memoirs and Poems by Black Americans.

== Personal life ==
Christine Boaz married her second husband, DeLos Peyton Fulwylie, in 1970. She was widowed when Fulwylie died in 1987.

Fulwylie-Bankston died in 1998, aged 82 years. That same year, she was named to the Florida Women's Hall of Fame.
