= Frederick B. Karl =

American judge

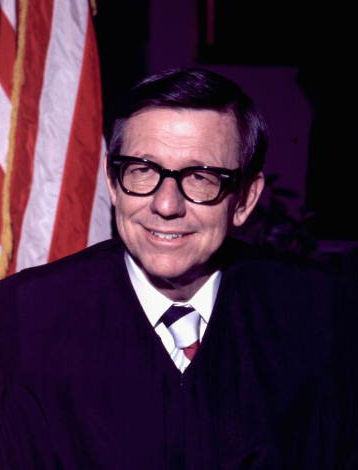
- Justice Frederick B. Karl, c. 1977

Member of the Florida House of Representatives from the 14th district
- In office 1956–1964

Member of the Florida Senate from the 14th district
- In office 1968–1971

Justice of the Florida Supreme Court
- In office January 4, 1977 – April 5, 1978
- Preceded by: B. K. Roberts
- Succeeded by: James E. Alderman

Personal details
- Born: May 14, 1924 Daytona Beach, Florida
- Died: March 7, 2013 (aged 88) Tampa, Florida
- Party: Democratic
- Children: 4
- Education: University of Florida, Stetson University College of Law

Military service
- Allegiance: United States of America
- Branch/service: United States Army
- Battles/wars: Battle of the Bulge

Frederick Brennan "Fred" Karl (May 14, 1924 – March 7, 2013) was an American politician. A decorated U.S. service member, he began his political career serving in the Florida House of Representatives from 1956 to 1964, after which he was elected to the Florida State Senate from 1968 to 1971 and the Florida Supreme Court from 1977 to 1978.

== Early life ==
Karl was born on May 14, 1924, in Daytona Beach, Florida, to Fred J. Karl and Mary Brennan. He attended Seabreeze High School while working as an usher at a local theatre. After graduation, he enrolled in the University of Florida and earned a Bachelor of Science in 1942.

Later that year he was commissioned a second lieutenant in the United States Army. He served in the European Theater of Operations and was wounded in the Battle of the Bulge. He was later awarded the Silver Star, Bronze Star Medal, and Purple Heart medals. In 1949 he received a law degree from Stetson University College of Law.

== Career ==
Karl ran unsuccessfully for Governor in 1964. He was elected to the Florida House of Representatives for Volusia County (District 14) in 1956, which he sat until 1964. He was elected to the state senate in 1968 and won an award the year after for "Most Outstanding First Term Member of the Senate". He served in the Senate until 1971.

=== Retirement(s) ===
In 1977, Karl was the last elected justice to the Florida Supreme Court, on which he served for one year. He retired and returned to private practice in April 1978. Later, he held positions of attorney to the Volusia County School Board, and District Attorney for Ormond Beach and Daytona Beach, and served as Chief Legal Officer and then as County Administrator of Hillsborough County, Florida. In 1994 he was appointed to head Tampa General Hospital.

In 2004, his eightieth year, Karl was appointed Interim City Attorney for Tampa, Florida, and then advisor to the Tampa-Hillsborough Expressway Authority in response to allegations of improper conduct by the Authority. In addition to serving in state and local offices, Karl was active as a community member, participating in many organizations such as the Rotary Club of Tampa, United Way of Hillsborough County, and the Stetson University Law Board of Overseers. He later retired from public life for the fourth and final time.

== Personal life ==
Karl's hobbies included boating, fishing, swimming. and water skiing. He released his autobiography, The 57 Club: My Four Decades in Florida Politics, in 2010. In a 2010 news article, Karl told a reporter that he was suffering from heart disease along with a progressive form of Parkinson's disease and diabetes. Karl was married to Faye Brooker Karl from 1948 until their divorce in June 1971. They had four children; Cynthia, Frederick B Jr (Rick), Mary and James. He married Mercedes Jensen Klipstine Proctor (b. 1939) a few weeks after his divorce from Faye was final.

=== Awards and honors ===
Karl was the winner of the 2004 Ralph A. Marsicano Award, an annual award in Florida for the person who has made significant contributions to the field of law over the long term. Tampa mayor Pam Iorio proclaimed April 18, 2008, in Tampa, Florida, as named Frederick B. Karl Day. A government building in Hillsborough County, Florida, is named for him.

=== Death ===
Karl died at his home in Tampa aged 88.
