= Wilhelmina Celeste Goehring Harvey =

American politician (1912–2005)

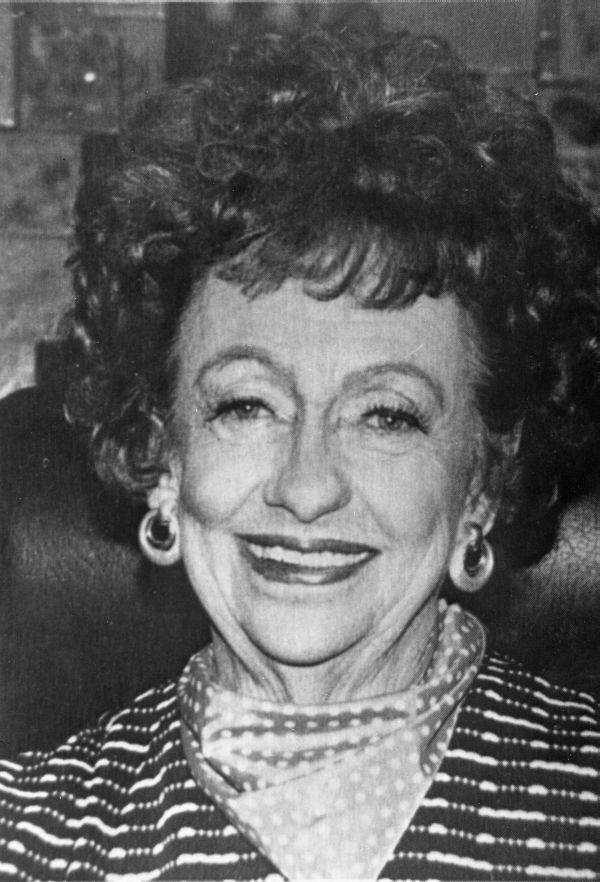
Harvey at an unknown date

Wilhelmina Celeste Goehring Harvey (1912 – May 3, 2005) was a philanthropist and the first female mayor of Monroe County, Florida. A "grand dame of Keys politics", she was frequently a public face of the Conch Republic. Outside politics, she was a science teacher and scuba diver.

== Biography ==
She was born in 1912 to one of Key West's original families. By 1935, she was a science teacher and taught summer school at Tulane University. She graduated from Florida State College for Women in 1937. She served as treasurer and board member of a local volunteer credit union (later Keys Federal Credit Union) in the 1940s. She married C.B. Harvey, who served as mayor of Key West in the 1950s.

Harvey earned a master's degree in public administration in 1980. In 1982, she was inducted into the Florida Women's Hall of Fame in its first year. She served as the first female mayor and the first female commissioner of Monroe County, and was the first to be elected Mayor Emeritus.

In April 1982, citizens of Key West formed the Conch Republic, a satirical micronation, in response to a Border Patrol checkpoint that disrupted travel and tourist activity. Harvey became Admiral and First Sea Lord of the Conch Republic's navy, whose actions included attacking a Coast Guard cutter with loaves of stale Cuban bread. The Conch Republic became a Key West mainstay as a tourist attraction and a humorous method for the city to negotiate with state and federal governments. During the 1995 "invasion", she stopped and accepted surrender from Army Reserve troops. She often served as the Republic's ambassador and met several presidents and foreign leaders in that capacity. In 1991, she hosted Queen Elizabeth at Dry Tortugas National Park, acting as both Monroe County mayor and Conch Republic ambassador.

In 1986, she ran for Florida House of Representatives from the 120th District, ultimately losing to Ron Saunders in the Democratic primary runoff. In 1997, the Monroe County commissioners voted to name the new county government building as Harvey Government Center at Historic Truman School after Harvey and her husband. In November 2000, she lost her re-election bid as Monroe County Commissioner, but remained a popular local figure.

Harvey died on May 3, 2005, at the age of 93. She received a large public funeral.
