= Dessie Smith Prescott =

American pilot

Dessie Smith Prescott (August 4, 1906 – April 19, 2002) was Florida’s first professional woman guide and the first female licensed pilot in the state. She was inducted into the Florida Women's Hall of Fame in 1999 for her work.

== Biography ==
Prescott was born on August 4, 1906, in Island Grove, Florida. Her parents died in the 1918 flu pandemic, and she went to live with an aunt, and later with her brother (in Baltimore). Prescott earned money by working many jobs, including working as a waitress and car seller. With extra money she earned, she would travel back to Florida and hunt game for a month every year. Prescott soon moved back to Florida, helping to sell houses.

Prescott later moved to Philadelphia, where she lived with her brother and learned how to fly on retired planes. After a while, she was issued a pilot's license, becoming the third woman in the United States to be issued such a license. Prescott flew in a barnstorming troop, before quitting. In World War II, she was a member of the Women's Army Corps and later began flying. After attending an Officer Training School in Des Moines, Iowa, Prescott was assigned to the Central Flying Training Command, and spent her time in Texas. After the war was over, she moved back to Florida, where she would reside until her death. She was a close friend of Marjorie Kinnan Rawlings.
