= Tease (TV series) =

American reality television series

Tease is an American television series which aired on the Oxygen Network. Actress Lisa Rinna, known to television audiences for her appearances on Days of Our Lives and Dancing with the Stars, was the host. The series started in 2007.

Each episode featured two up-and-coming hair stylists selected from nationwide salons as they faced off in what was billed as an "Olympics-style" tournament.

The aspiring stylists demonstrate their skills before a panel of judges: hairstylist Peter Ishkhans, model Roshumba Williams and agent Frank Moore. They compete for an opportunity to face one of three master stylists — Clyde Haygood, Stephanie Hobgood or Kim Vo in one‑on‑one challenge. If the contestant outperforms the master stylist, their photograph is added to a program's "hair wall of fame" and they receive the show's "silver scissors" award.

Each episode includes a themed timed challenge designed to push the stylists' skills to the limit. The challenges in the 2007 season include:

Ep#1 Celeb Look-alike
Ep#2 Long to Short
Ep#3 Blondes Have More Fun
Ep#4 Identical Twins
Ep#5 Rock n' Roll Hair
Ep#6 Avant Garde

Tease is executive produced by Michael Yudin for MY Entertainment (King of Vegas, and Pros vs. Joes) and J. Brian Gadinsky for G Group (American Idol Season One, American Gladiators, and America's Most Wanted).
