= Harry Lee Anstead =

American judge

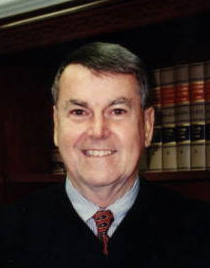

Chief Justice of the Florida Supreme Court
- In office July 1, 2002 – June 30, 2004
- Preceded by: Charles T. Wells
- Succeeded by: Barbara Pariente

Justice of the Florida Supreme Court
- In office 1994 – January 5, 2009
- Appointed by: Lawton Chiles
- Preceded by: Rosemary Barkett
- Succeeded by: Jorge Labarga

Personal details
- Born: November 4, 1937 (age 88) Jacksonville, Florida, U.S.
- Party: Democratic
- Spouse: Sue Anstead

Harry Lee Anstead (born November 4, 1937) was an American judge, who served as justice of the Florida Supreme Court. Prior to his appointment to the Florida Supreme Court by Governor Lawton Chiles, Anstead served as a judge on Florida's Fourth District Court of Appeals from 1977 to 1994.

== Early life ==
Harry Lee Anstead was born on November 4, 1937, in Jacksonville, Florida, the youngest of six children. Shortly after he was born, his father deserted the family, and his mother Loretta moved the family into the Brentwood housing project. His mother supported the family working as a clerk for an insurance company, and also made bandages for the Red Cross. All of the children worked to help support the family, with Anstead starting at age 11, delivering groceries, mowing lawns, and later when he was older, working in ship yards, an electrician's helper, a roofer, and a mover. He graduated from Andrew Jackson High School in 1956. He married his wife Sue Anstead, in August 1963, and they have five children.

=== Education ===
Anstead attended the University of Florida as an undergraduate and received his law degree from the University of Florida's College of Law. While at the University of Florida, he was a member of Sigma Phi Epsilon Fraternity. Anstead later received his Masters of Law degree from the University of Virginia. He also briefly served with the National Security Agency, before moving back to Florida to attend law school.

== Legal career ==
Anstead served as a judge on Florida's Fourth District Court of Appeal from 1977 to 1994. He was appointed to the Florida Supreme Court by Governor Lawton Chiles, and served from 1994 to January 2009. He served as chief justice from July 1, 2002, until June 30, 2004.

His administration as Chief Justice was most noted for its successful implementation of "Revision 7," a constitutional amendment requiring the Florida Legislature to assume most of the cost of local state trial courts. Anstead also authored the majority opinion in Powell v. Allstate Insurance Company, which granted a new trial to black plaintiffs, because the all white jury made disparaging racial jokes in the jury room about the plaintiffs. After the 2000 presidential election, Anstead was one of four justices who voted to order a statewide recount of all undervotes, over 61,000 ballots that the vote tabulation machines had missed. In the aftermath of the court's decision, Florida conservatives criticized him for his liberal "judicial activism", and an organization called "Balance to the Bench" was formed whose aim was to oust Anstead from the court. The initiative was unsuccessful, and he subsequently served as chief justice from 2002 to 2004.

== See also ==
- Bush v. Gore
- List of justices of the Florida Supreme Court
