= Helene S. Coleman =

Former President of the National Council of Jewish Women (1925–2021)

- Born: April 22, 1925; New York City, New York, United States
- Died: January 30, 2021 (aged 95); Jacksonville, Florida, United States
- Education: Hunter College

Helene S. Coleman (April 22, 1925 - January 30, 2021) was the president of the National Council of Jewish Women in the USA. She was inducted into the Florida Women's Hall of Fame in 1982. Coleman was instrumental in establishing the Guardian ad Litem program in the state of Florida in 1979. She was born in New York City and received her undergraduate degree from Hunter College in 1945. Coleman died January 30, 2021, in Jacksonville, Florida.
