= Alicia Baro =

American activist

- Born: August 1, 1918; San Lorenzo, Puerto Rico
- Died: January 2, 2012 (aged 93); Miami, Florida, U.S.
- Occupation: Human rights activist

Alicia Santos Baró (August 1, 1918–January 2, 2012) was a human rights activist who worked to increase political representation and improve educational opportunities for Hispanic women and other minorities. A Miami street was named in her honor in 2014.

== Early life and education ==
Baró was born in San Lorenzo, Puerto Rico and raised in New York City. She graduated from Hunter College in 1940 with a bachelor's degree in education. Baró relocated with her family to Miami, Florida in the 1950s.

== Career ==
Baró was a founding member of the Puerto Rican Democrats Organization, the Miami chapter of the National Conference of Puerto Rican Women (NACOPRW), the Coalition of Hispanic American Women, and the Women's Chamber of Commerce of South Florida.

== Awards ==
Baró was the recipient of the Miami Herald Spirit of Excellence award, the ASPIRA organization's Lifetime Achievement Award, and an honorary doctorate from the University of Puerto Rico. She received Distinguished Service Awards from the 18th District of the Florida Congressional Delegation and the City of Miami.

In 1995, the NACOPRW instituted the annual Alicia Baró Achievement Award.

In 1997, Alicia Baro was inducted to the Florida Women's Hall of Fame.

== Death and legacy ==
Baró died on January 2, 2012, at the age of 93.

In 2014, a Miami street was named "Dr. Alicia S. Baró Way" in her honor. Baró is featured in Marie Anderson's book, Julia's Daughters: Women in Dade's History.
