= Elizabeth "Budd" Bell =

Elizabeth "Budd" Bell was a human service lobbyist, and social worker by education, who was one of the people that helped draft Florida's Baker Act. She was known as “the conscience of Florida.”

She was inducted into the Florida Women's Hall of Fame in 2012.

== Biography ==
Born Elizabeth ”Bess” Lander in 1915, Bell died October 15, 2009, at the age of 94. She was a Winnipeg native who emigrated to the United States in 1949.

== Career ==
Bell founded the Budd Bell Clearinghouse of Human Services in 1974, the Florida Center for Children and Youth and Florida's Human Rights Advocacy Committee. Bell was a founding member of the National Association of Social Workers.
