= Caridad Asensio =

Cuban-American migrant worker advocate

- Born: 1931; Cuba
- Died: October 31, 2011; Miami, Florida, U.S.
- Known for: Caridad Health Clinic
- Children: 2
- Honors: Florida Women's Hall of Fame
- Website: caridad.org

Caridad G. Asensio (1931– October 31, 2011) was a Cuban-American migrant worker advocate.

== Early life ==
Asensio was born in Cuba alongside two sisters. She was raised and married in Cuba until Fidel Castro took power, which is when she emigrated to New York and then Boca Raton, Florida with her family.

== Career ==
After Asensio and her family moved to Florida in 1960, she worked at Hagen Road Elementary School as a social worker and health educator. While there, she met her future co-founder Connie Berry who was a teacher at the school. Asensio soon began volunteering at Our Lady Queen of Peace Catholic Mission in Delray Beach and eventually founded the Migrant Association in a trailer to provide low-cost housing to migrant workers. Two years later, Asensio and Berry co-founded the Caridad Health Clinic which operated with the assistance of volunteer doctors and dentists. The Clinic was the first in South Florida to provide free health care to farm workers and their families. By 1992, the Migrant Association moved 79 families into stable livable trailers.

As a result of its early success, the association moved to a $2.5 million clinic dubbed the Caridad Center within its first five years of operation. In 1995, Asensio was awarded the JCPenney Golden Rule Award for her migrant worker advocacy and the Palm Beach County Literacy Coalition President's Award. On December 3, 2001, Asensio was hit by a car while crossing the street and went into a coma. Although she regained her ability to speak, she had difficulty walking. In 2005, Asensio was inducted into the Florida Women's Hall of Fame. Caridad died on October 31, 2011, after experiencing a seizure.

== Personal life ==
Asensio and her husband have two children together. Her son Manuel P. Asensio was the proprietor of a small brokerage firm.
