= Marianne Mathewson-Chapman =

American Army nurse and major general

- Born: 1948 (age 77–78); Sabetha, Kansas, U.S.
- Alma mater: University of Florida
- Spouse: Robert Peter Chapman
- Military career
- Allegiance: United States
- Branch: Army National Guard
- Service years: 1975–2002
- Rank: Major General
- Conflicts: Gulf War
- Awards: Legion of Merit; Bronze Star Medal; Meritorious Service Medal (2); Army Commendation Medal (2); Army Achievement Medal

Marianne Mathewson-Chapman is a career nurse and retired major general in the United States Army National Guard. She was the first female to be promoted to the rank of major general in the Army National Guard.

== Early life ==
Mathewson-Chapman was born in Sabetha, Kansas and graduated from Kansas State University. Her older brother Joseph is a retired colonel of the California Army National Guard, and her sister-in-law was a lieutenant colonel.

== Military career ==
Upon finishing nursing school, Mathewson-Chapman went to San Diego to work with the United States Navy in helping returning prisoners of war from Vietnam. In 1972, she left the navy to continue her civilian education. She joined the United States National Guard in 1975 and served in California, Pennsylvania, and Florida. By 1992, she was promoted to chief nurse. Mathewson-Chapman was deployed as a nurse in the medical corps during the Gulf War. She participated in Operation Desert Storm as part of a medical team that supervised the establishment of 44 hospitals. On October 1, 1998, Mathewson-Chapman was promoted to Deputy Surgeon General/Special Assistant with the Army National Guard.

While still serving in the National Guard, Mathewson-Chapman became an assistant professor in the faculty of nursing at the University of Florida. She also led the first interagency integrated program at 63 National Guard/Reserve demobilization sites, developed the first outreach program for Individual Ready Reserve members, and established a combat veteran call center. On May 15, 2000, she became the first woman to be promoted to the rank of major general in the Army National Guard. As well, she became the first Florida National Guard general officer to be appointed to a national military position at The Pentagon. That year, she was inducted into the Florida Women's Hall of Fame.

Mathewson-Chapman retired from the army on October 1, 2002, but stayed involved in army advocacy by sitting as vice-chair on the National Army Guard Equal Opportunity Committee. While in the United States Army Reserve, she also became the special assistant to the director of the Army National Guard in Washington and nurse executive for the United States Department of Veterans Affairs. As of 2011, she serves as the Outreach Coordinator to Guard/Reserve in the VHA OEF/OIF Outreach Office Administration. In Spring 2024, she was honored on the Bay Pines VA's Women Veteran Wall. The theme of the wall was "The Courage to Keep Fighting" to recognize the honorees' fight with cancer.
