= Sarah Ann Blocker =

American educator (1857–1944)

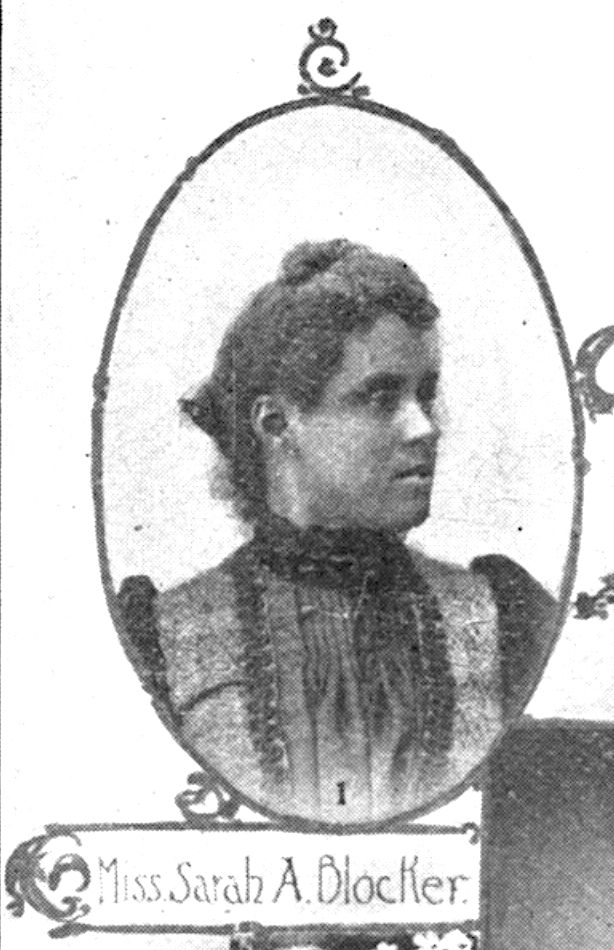
Blocker in a 1902 publication

Sarah Ann Blocker (October 27, 1857 – April 15, 1944) was an American educator and co-founder of Florida Memorial College, one of Florida's oldest HBCU. She was renowned for her leadership role as a teacher and administrator, playing a central role in expanding educational opportunities for African American students. Blocker was also inducted into the Florida Women's Hall of Fame in 2003.

== Education ==
Sarah Ann Blocker went to high school in Augusta, GA. She went on to study at Atlanta University for three years, where she also received her teaching certificate in 1883. Blocker attended summer school at Harvard University.

== Career ==
Blocker taught at Florida Baptist Academy from 1892, and was head of the normal department there. Blocker is credited with co-founding Florida Memorial College by arranging the merger of Florida Baptist Institute and Florida Baptist Academy, to form the Florida Memorial and Industrial Memorial Institute. Blocker served as the Dean of Women, Registrar, and Vice President at the institute for 51 years until 1943. During that period, she helped sustain the institute through management and fundraising, including contributing her annual salary to pay teachers’ wages. One of her students at Florida Baptist Academy was philanthropist Eartha M. M. White. Another was author Zora Neale Hurston, who later became an instructor at the school.

== Personal life and legacy ==
Sarah Ann Blocker died April 17, 1944, aged 86 years. She was originally buried on the Florida Memorial's St. Augustine campus alongside fellow co-founder and president, Nathan W. Collier. In 2003, Sarah Ann Blocker was inducted into the Florida Women's Hall of Fame by Governor Jeb Bush. The following year, she received a posthumous honorary doctorate as part of the 125th-anniversary celebration at Florida Memorial University. The university honors her legacy by naming one of its building Sarah A. Blocker Hall. She is also commemorated, alongside other key figures of the institution, through the Collier-Blocker-Puryear Park. Additionally, there is a Sarah A. Blocker Meritorious Service Award given annually by Florida Memorial University. This award is considered to be the most prestigious recognition a female student can receive from the college.
