= Mary Brennan Karl =

American educator (1893–1948)

- Born: 1893
- Died: 1948 (aged 54–55)
- Spouse: Frederick J. Karl
- Children: Frederick B. Karl Kathryn M. Karl John F. Karl

Mary Brennan Karl (1893–1948) was an American educator who founded the school that would become Daytona State College. In 2011, she was inducted into the Florida Women's Hall of Fame.

== Biography ==
Mary Karl was born in Harbor Beach, Michigan, and was a graduate of the Noble School of Elocution in Detroit and the Emerson College in Boston, Massachusetts. In 1921 she married Fred Karl, who was a co-owner of the telephone system in Harbor Beach with his father and moved to Volusia County, Florida. She began her educational career teaching business courses in the Volusia County school system. Karl later became a business teacher at the Opportunity school in 1931, a vocational school. She expanded the courses offered at the school, and led it through a period of large growth, becoming the director of the school in 1937. Throughout World War II, Karl and the Opportunity school trained thousands of people, teaching citizens how to work in defense industries.

As World War II began to end, the school transitioned to a school specifically for veterans. In the post-war aftermath, Karl, supported by the local newspaper and political leaders, as well as working with Mary McLeod Bethune and meeting with Eleanor Roosevelt, convinced the War Assets Administration to donate the Welch center, a complex consisting of fifty-five buildings (classrooms, a library, cafeteria and dormitories), and an Olympic swimming pool to Volusia County. The county's board voted to name the school the Mary Karl Vocational school. Karl died in 1948.

Though it had always been Karl's long-term goal to have the school become part of the State University System of Florida or a community college, neither happened in her life. However, shortly after her death, Daytona Beach Community College was built. The school later merged with the Mary Karl Vocational school to become Daytona State College. The school still houses the Mary Karl Memorial Learning Resources Center.
