= Mary Lou Baker =

American politician

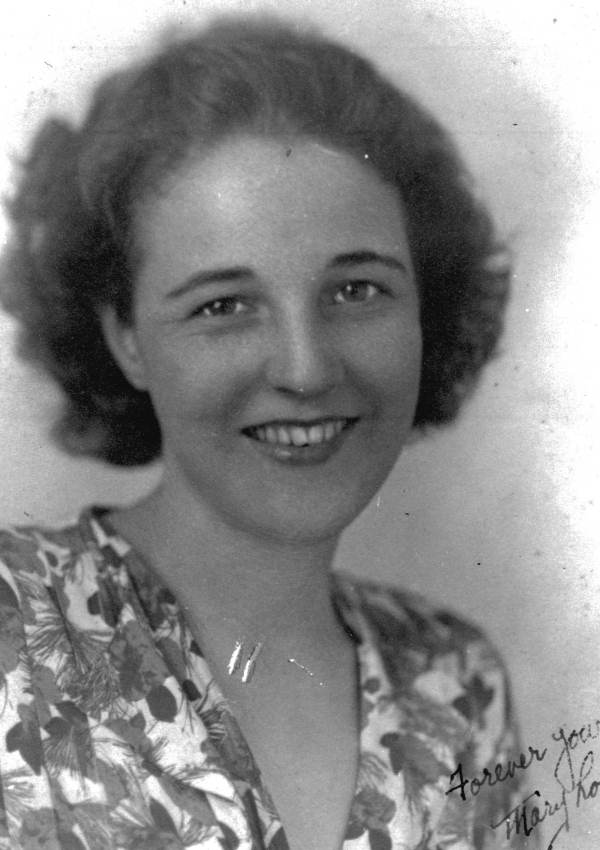

Member of the Florida House of Representatives from the Pinellas County district
- In office 1942–1945
- Preceded by: Stanley Minshall
- Succeeded by: Charles J. Schuh Jr.

Personal details
- Born: 1914 Utah, U.S.
- Died: 1965
- Education: Stetson University (LD)
- Occupation: Politician
- Awards: Florida Women's Hall of Fame

Mary Lou Baker (1914–1965) was a member of the Florida House of Representatives and a women's rights activist.

== Early life ==
Born in Utah, Baker moved to Florida in 1925, where her father served as a judge and her mother headed the Florida Democratic Women's Club.

== Education ==
She had a law degree from Stetson University.

== Career ==
Baker held a seat in the Florida House of Representatives from 1942 to 1945. In this role, she passed the Women's Rights bill to let women operate their family business while their husband was serving in the military, including the conveying property, create documents, and sue. She was also a strong advocate of co-ed education and was instrumental for the inclusion of women in the University of Florida. She also tried unsuccessfully to open juries to women, something that would not be accomplished until 1949. In 1946, she lost her bid for reelection and returned to practicing as a lawyer.

== Death ==
Baker died in 1965 at age 50. After many years of nominations, she was inducted to the Florida Women's Hall of Fame in 2017.
