= AFP: American Fighter Pilot =

2002 American reality TV series

- DVD cover
- Genre: Documentary
- Created by: Jesse Negron
- Narrated by: Chris Penn
- Country of origin: United States
- Original language: English
- No. of episodes: 2 (+5 unaired)

Production
- Executive producers: Tony Scott; Ridley Scott; J. Brian Gadinsky; Jesse Negron
- Production locations: Panama City, Florida

Original release
- Network: CBS
- Release: March 29 – April 5, 2002

AFP: American Fighter Pilot is a reality series broadcast briefly on CBS in 2002. It followed three United States Air Force officers as they trained to become pilots of F-15 fighter jets at Tyndall Air Force Base outside of Panama City, Florida. The series included footage of their experiences in the air, as well as interactions with their families and instructors. Directors Tony Scott and Ridley Scott were co-executive producers. Unsuccessful in the ratings, the series was cancelled after two episodes.

== Media information ==
The full series of seven episodes (including five unaired episodes) was released on DVD in 2005 by Hannover House.
