= J. Brian Gadinsky =

American television producer

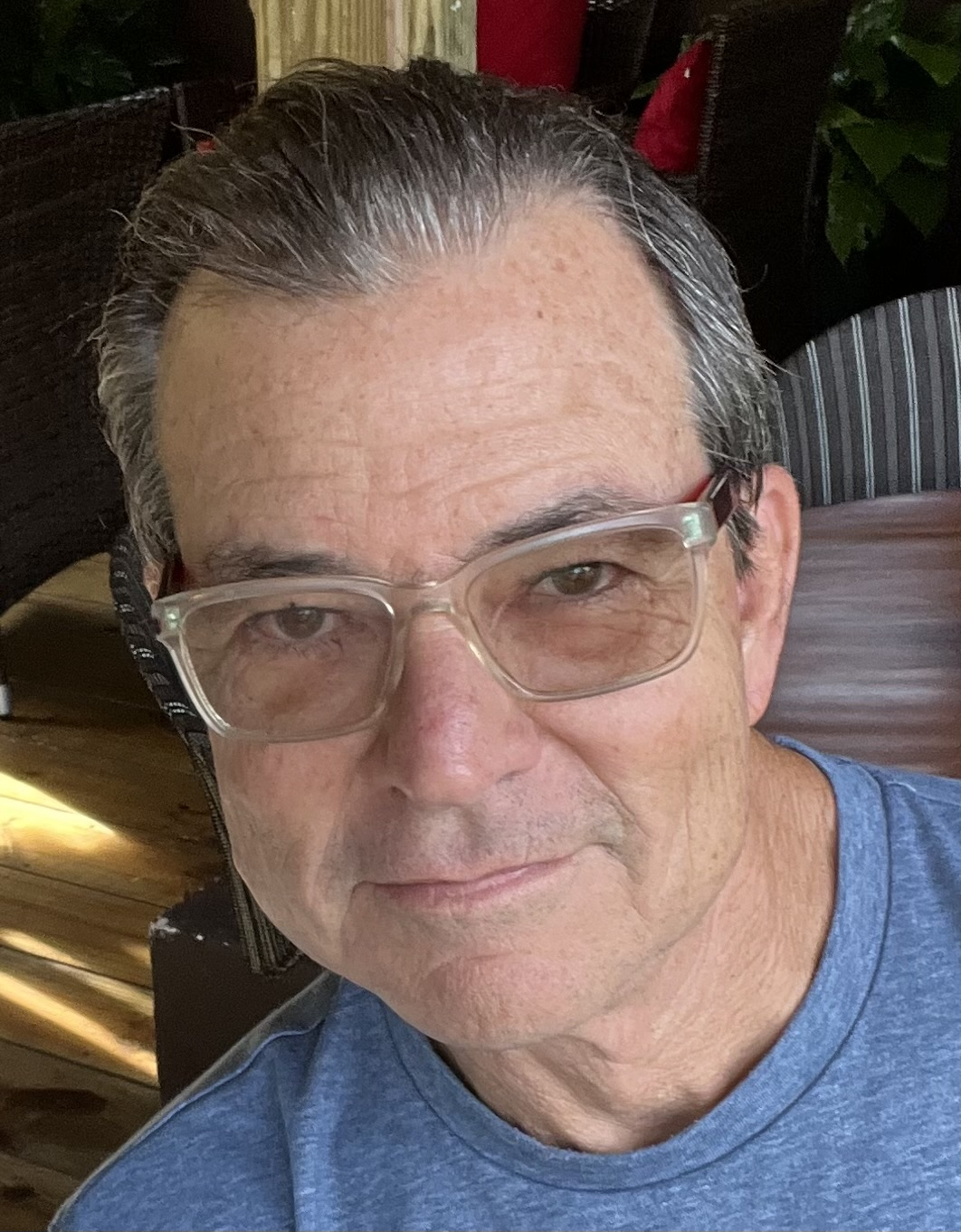
- Born: February 8, 1957 (age 69)
- Education: Syracuse University
- Occupations: Television producer and writer School teacher
- Mother: Elaine Gordon

J. Brian Gadinsky is an American television producer. He is known for being an executive producer for the first season of American Idol, and for producing the inaugural season of America's Most Wanted. He is the CEO of The G Group, and prior to his work in reality television, was a news producer for WTVJ among other local stations. He has received six regional Emmy Awards, a Daytime Emmy nomination, and a Primetime Emmy nomination.

== Early life ==
J. Brian Gadinsky was born on February 8, 1957, and is the son of former Florida State Rep. Elaine Gordon. He grew up in Miami Beach, graduated from Miami Beach High School, and received a B.S. from Syracuse University in 1979.

== Career ==
In his early career Gadinsky worked as a producer at the PBS affiliate WPBT. In 1983, at the age of twenty-seven, he became the Director of Public Affairs at the CBS affiliate WTVJ and the executive producer of the Miami-based television news magazine Montage on WTVJ. In 1986 he received his first news Emmy Award for the show's investigative and feature reporting, and received six Emmy Awards overall. In 1987, Gadinsky also wrote, directed, and produced the syndicated documentary The ABC's of AIDS, for which he received an Emmy Award for writing.

Due in part to the success he had in turning around Montage, Gadinsky became the original producer of the television series America's Most Wanted. In 1991 he was also a producer for American Gladiators, which he produced for five seasons, and for which he was nominated for the Daytime Emmy Award for Outstanding Game/Audience Participation Show. In the late-1990s he was also the executive producer for the television series RollerJam on the Nashville Network.

During the 2000s, Gadinsky was an executive producer for Combat Missions on USA Network, an executive producer for Mr. Personality and Anchorwoman on Fox, and an executive producer for American Fighter Pilot on CBS. He was chosen as an executive producer for American Idol's first season due to his television production experience, for which he was nominated for the Primetime Emmy Award for Outstanding Producer of Reality/Game/Informational Series Television in 2003. Gadinsky is also the creator and executive producer for the BET show Sunday Best.

Gadinsky was the CEO of The G Group, a reality television production company where he produced shows including King of Vegas and Tease. In the fall of 2023, Gadinsky began teaching Social Studies at Horace Mann Middle School in El Portal Florida, as a Corps Member with Teach for America.

== Personal life ==
In 2003, Gadinsky signed with the William Morris Agency. He is a season ticket holder with the Los Angeles Dodgers. In 2011, Gadinsky was credited by sports columnist Bill Plaschke for rallying fan resistance, which led in part to the ouster of owner Frank McCourt. He is a member of the Miami Beach High School Hall of Fame. Gadinsky has two sons. His son, Jonah, is a Talent Manager with Dixon Talent in Los Angeles.
