= Judith Kersey =

American engineer at NASA

Judith A. Kersey (born 1943) is an American engineer. She was the first woman guidance systems engineer at NASA Kennedy Space Center.

== Education ==
As a student at the University of Florida, Kersey initiated and chaired the first Florida State Symposium for Women in Engineering and Science in 1974. In 1975, she became a senior member of the Society of Women Engineers and was elected the national career guidance committee chair.

== Career ==
After earning a master’s degree in electrical engineering, she joined the engineering team at Kennedy Space Center. As one of the first female engineers at the spaceport, Kersey was not listened to by her superiors. After warning a senior engineer of a potential mistake, which was proven to be the correct judgment, she was promoted to the Systems Assurance Office to ensure similar mistakes were avoided.

She later became the first female guidance systems engineer at NASA during the Apollo program. Amongst her years at NASA, she had held various positions such as NASA deputy director for Electronic Engineering, division chief of the Space Shuttle test group at Vandenberg Air Force Base, and NASA associate director for Safety, Reliability and Quality Assurance. She also played a roles in the Saturn V and the space shuttle programs and received the Kennedy Space Center Federal Woman of the Year Award, the NASA Exceptional Service Medal, and was selected as a Fellow Member of the Society of Women Engineers. Upon her retirement, Kersey sat as a member of the Society of Women Engineers's electronic communications committee and a member of the scholarship committee.

In 2005, Kersey was inducted into the Florida Women's Hall of Fame.
