= Lylburn Downing School =

- U.S. National Register of Historic Places
- Virginia Landmarks Register
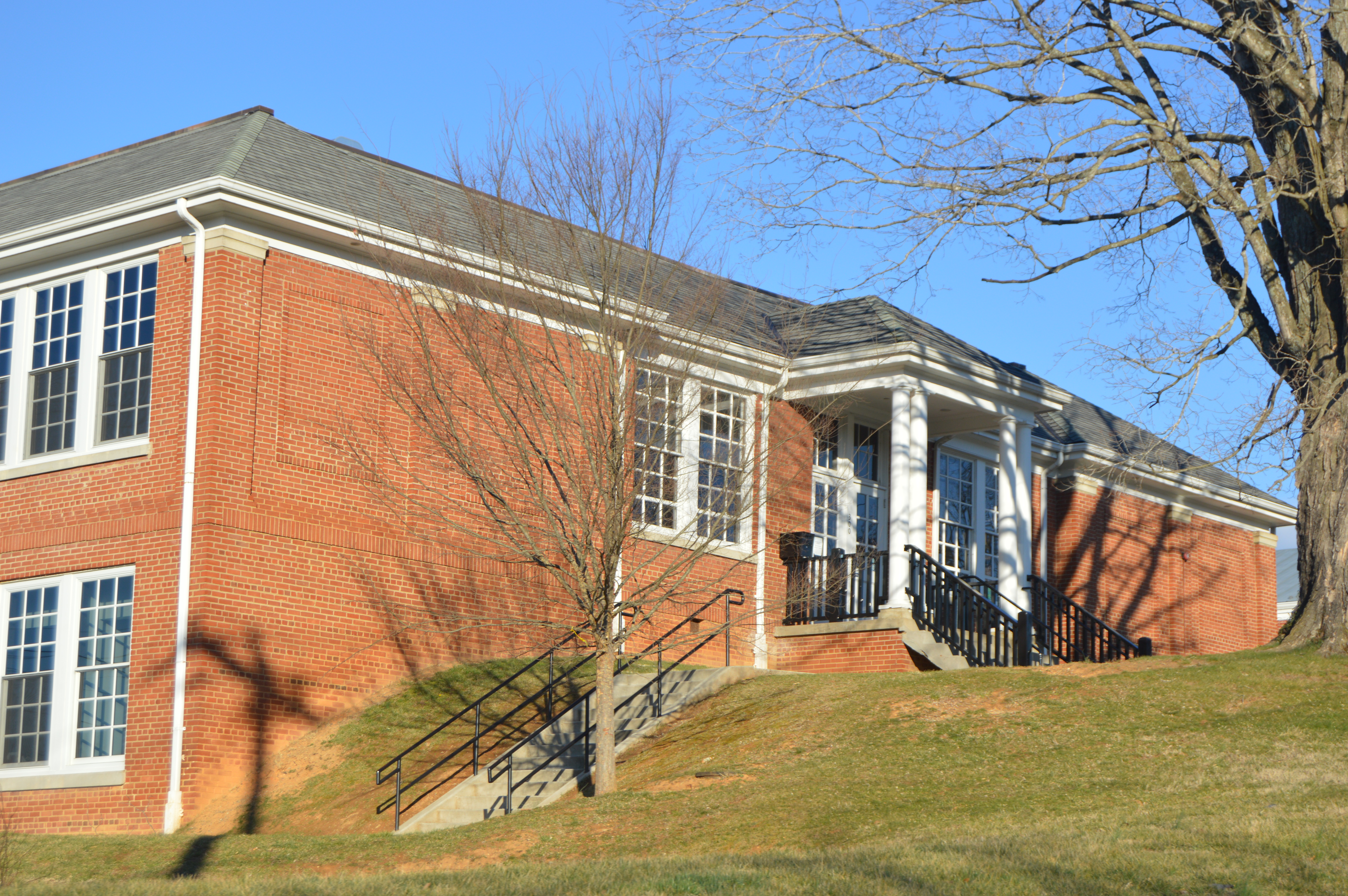
- Front, seen from the north

- Location within Virginia Location within the United States
- Location: 300 Diamond St., Lexington, Virginia
- Coordinates: 37°47′10″N 79°26′03″W
- Area: less than one acre
- Built: 1927
- Architect: Fleming R. Hurt, Daley Craig
- Architectural style: Classical Revival
- NRHP reference No.: 03001093
- VLR No.: 117-5002

Significant dates
- Added to NRHP: October 23, 2003
- Designated VLR: June 18, 2003

Lylburn Downing School is a historic school building for African-American children located at Lexington, Virginia. It was built in 1926–1927, and is a one-story, Classical Revival style brick building. It has a columned entry porch and pilasters. A rear addition was constructed in 1939–1940, and a covered walkway in 1948–1949. The City of Lexington converted the original building into a community center in the late 1980s.

Lylburn Downing Middle School currently serves as a small, city school located in Lexington, Virginia in the southwest Virginia Appalachian Mountains. The school serves 189 students in grades 6–8, with ages ranging from 11 to 15 years old. It was listed on the National Register of Historic Places in 2003.

== Notable people ==
- Leander J. Shaw, Jr., Chief Justice of the Florida Supreme Court, went to Lylburn Downing School.
