= Florida Women's Hall of Fame =

Honor roll of women who contributed to Florida life

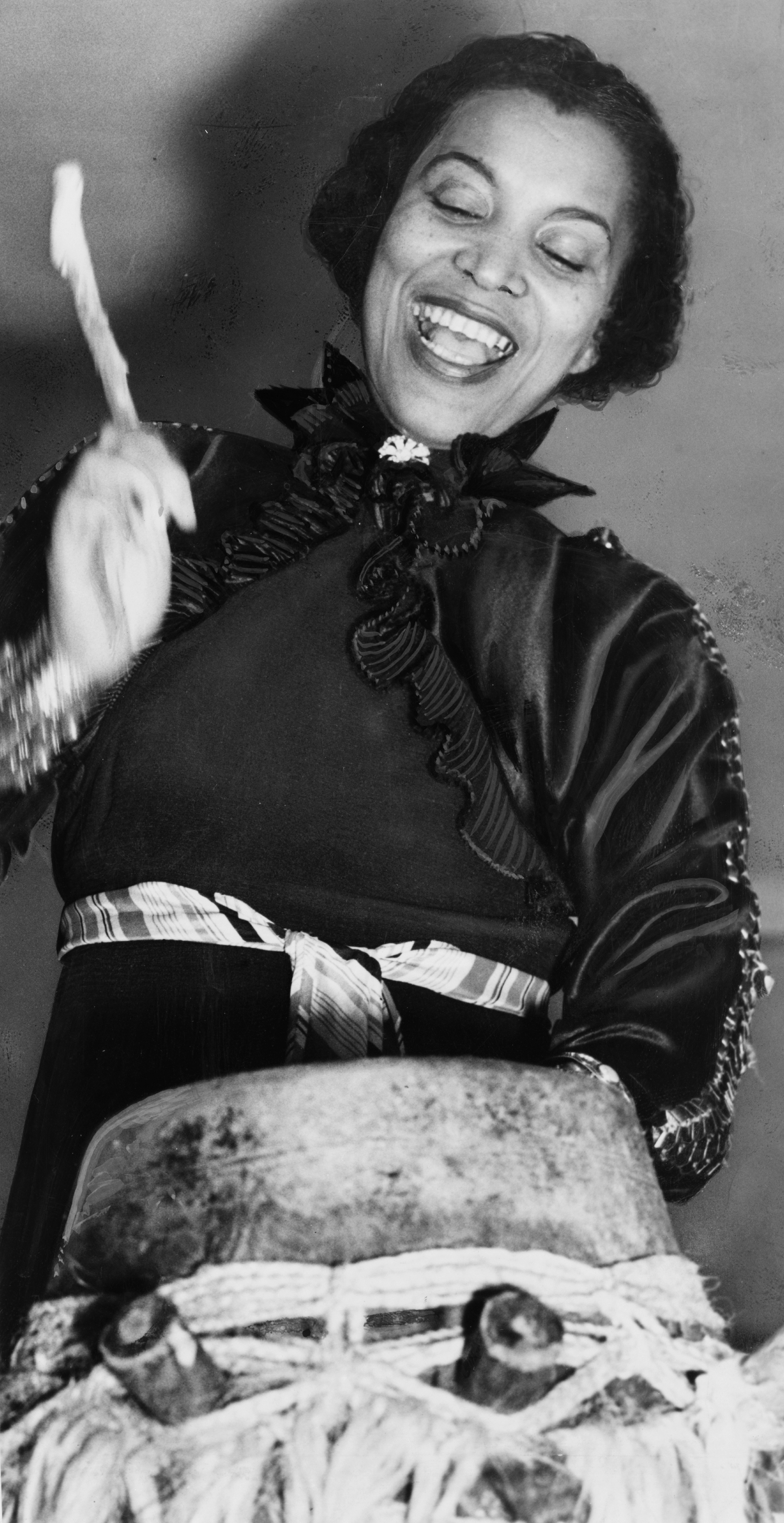
Zora Neale Hurston beating a Haitian tambour maman or mama drum

The Florida Women's Hall of Fame is an honor roll of women who have contributed to life for citizens of the US state of Florida. An awards ceremony for the hall of fame was first held in 1982 and recipient names are displayed in the Florida State Capitol. The program was created by an act of the Florida Legislature and is overseen by the Florida Commission on the Status of Women (FCSW), a nonpartisan board created in 1991 to study and "make recommendations to the Governor, Cabinet and Legislature on issues affecting women". The FCSW also manages the Florida Achievement Award for those who have improved the lives of women and girls in Florida, an award is focused on outstanding volunteerism. FCSW members serve by appointment and the commission is housed at the Office of the Attorney General of Florida.

== History ==
President John F. Kennedy created the Presidential Commission on the Status of Women (PCSW) in 1961, and in 1964 Florida Governor Farris Bryant created the Governor's Commission on the Status of Women (COSW) "to study laws and regulations pertaining to women in Florida and make recommendations to the legislature based on their findings." In 1992, Governor Lawton Chiles proposed, and the Legislature passed a bill (CSSB 1148) that created a permanent Florida Women's Hall of Fame. Chapter 92-48 of the Laws of Florida now states: "It is the intent of the Legislature to recognize and honor those women who, through their works and lives, have made significant improvement of the life for women and for citizens of Florida."

This legislation mandated the inclusion of women who had been honored in the previous decade. Because education is one important purpose of the Hall of Fame, CSSB 1148 provided display space in the Florida Capitol. In 1994, the Commission unveiled plaques that offer a brief biography and photograph of each honoree.

Florida Statutes, Title XVIII Public Lands and Property, Chapter 265 Memorials, Museums and Arts and Culture, section 265.001 Florida Women's Hall of Fame, sets the parameters within which the hall of fame operates. In 1982, the first Florida Women's Hall of Fame ceremony and reception was held by COSW at the Florida Governor's Mansion in Tallahassee.

== Overview ==
The purpose of the Florida Women's Hall of Fame, according to the intention expressed in the actual Florida Statute, is "to recognize and honor those women who, through their works and lives, have made significant contributions to the improvement of life for women and for all citizens of Florida".

Each year, women from Florida, or who have adopted it as their home state, are nominated for induction. The governor of Florida decides on the final three nominees from a shortlist of ten nominees. The rotunda of the Florida State Capitol building has a permanent display of photos of Florida Women's Hall of Fame inductees.

Since 1992, up to three women have been inducted into the Hall each year. Nominations are made between April 1 and July 15 of each year. These nominations are carefully reviewed by members of the FCSW who then propose 10 finalists to the Governor who selects the final inductees each year.

Several other states have a Hall of Fame for notable women, including Alabama, Arizona, Colorado, Connecticut, Iowa, Maine, Michigan, Maryland, Ohio and Texas. The United States' National Women's Hall of Fame is based in Seneca Falls, New York.

== Inductees ==
Florida Women's Hall of Fame
Name	Image	Birth–Death	Year	Area of achievement	Ref(s)
Belle Yates Bear		(b. 1941)	2024	philanthropist and community advocate	
Mary Bulmer Brickell		(1836–1922)	2024	"Mother of Miami"	
Dotti Groover-Skipper		(b. 1956)	2024	anti-human trafficking advocate	
May Mann Jennings		(1872–1963)	2023	Activist and former first lady of Florida.	
Graci McGillicuddy		(b. 1941)	2023	Anti child abuse activist	
Penny Thompson		(1917-1975)	2023	Aviator	
Kathleen Passidomo		(b. 1953)	2022	President of the Florida Senate.	
Lilly Pulitzer		(1931–2013)	2022	Fashion designer and entrepreneur.	
Audrey Schiebler		(1933–2015)	2022	Child welfare advocate.	
Virginia M. Hernandez Covington		(b. 1955)	2021	Senior Judge of the United States District Court for the Middle District of Florida	
Barbara Nicklaus		(b. 1940)	2021	Co-founder of the Nicklaus Children's Health Care Foundation, philanthropist	
Beverly Yeager		(b. 1932)	2021	Former Director of the Florida Department of State's Cultural Affairs Division	
Alice Scott Abbott		(1856–1920)	2020	Activist for women's suffrage and other issues	
Alma Lee Loy		(1929–2020)	2020	Civic leader, "First Lady of Vero Beach"	
E. Thelma Waters		(1939–2021)	2020	Advocate for women, children, migrant laborers in Indiantown	
Doris Mae Barnes		(1927–2010)	2019	Sports fishing photographer	
Judith A. Bense		(b. 1945)	2019	Academic and archeologist	
Mildred Wilborn Gildersleeve		(1858–1950)	2019	Nurse, midwife	
Adela Hernandez Gonzmart		(1920–2001)	2018	Restaurateur and patron of the arts in the Ybor City area of Tampa	
Janet Petro		(b. 1960)	2018	Deputy Director of the Kennedy Space Center since 2007, first woman to have that role	
Lee Bird Leavengood		(b. 1928)	2018	Member of first gender-integrated class at the University of Florida; three decades of administration at University of South Florida	
Mary Lou Baker		(1914–1965)	2017	Florida House of Representatives Responsible for the passage of Florida's 1943 women's rights legislation that enabled women to run the family business if the husband entered the military. Elected and served while keeping her maiden name.	
Kathleen Scott Robertson		(1921–2013)	2017	One of the first 7 WAVES to enlist in the United States Navy	
Katherine Fernandez Rundle		(b. 1950)	2017	Florida's first Cuban-American State Attorney	
Carol Jenkins Barnett		(1956–2021)	2016	President of Publix Super Markets Charities, Inc.	
Helen Aguirre Ferré		(b. 1957)	2016	Journalist	
Elmira Louise Leto		(b. 1949)	2016	Founder and CEO of Samuel's House, Inc., an agency to provide housing to the homeless	
Mary Lee Farrior		(b. 1937)	2015	Coca-Cola heir from Tampa who gave $1 million to start Mary Lee's House, a center combining facilities for child abuse prevention, assessment, forensics and counseling	
Evelyn Cahn Keiser		(1924–2024)	2015	Co-founded the Keiser School in 1977	
Charlotte E. Maguire		(1918–2014)	2015	First woman physician in Orlando, founded one of the first pediatric clinics in Florida	
Susan Benton		(b. 1949)	2014	Sheriff of Highlands County, Florida; 2013 President of the Florida Sheriff's Association; first female sheriff elected in a general election in Florida history	
Louise Jones Gopher		(1945–2016)	2014	First woman from the Seminole Tribe of Florida to earn a college degree	
Dottie Berger MacKinnon		(1942–2013)	2014	Founder of Joshua House, advocate for women and children	
Clara C. Frye		(1872–1936)	2013	African American nurse in Tampa, Florida who established the Clara Frye Hospital	
Aleene Pridgen Kidd MacKenzie		(1921–2013)	2013	Assistant Director of Development at Florida State University, first Chair of the Governor's Commission on the Status of Women	
Lillie Pierce Voss		(1876–1967)	2013	Writer and early pioneer; interacted with the Seminole Indians as a child, earning the nickname "Sweetheart of the Barefoot Mailmen"	
Ruth H. Alexander		(1938–2021)	2012	Established the "Lady Gator Athletic" program	
Vicki Bryant Burke		(b. 1953)	2012	Social worker, juvenile justice system	
Elizabeth "Budd" Bell		(1915–2009)	2012	Social worker	
Mary Brennan Karl		(1890–1948)	2011	Education pioneer whose efforts were a foundation of what later became Daytona Beach Junior College	
Anna I. Rodriguez		(b. 1957)	2011	Founder Florida Coalition Against Human Trafficking	
Eugenie Clark		(1922–2015)	2010	Ichthyologist	
Claudine Dianne Ryce		(1943–2009)	2010	Advocate for missing children	
Dara Grace Torres		(b. 1967)	2010	Olympic gold-silver-bronze medalist swimmer	
Louise H. Courtelis		(1932–2023)	2009	Philanthropist	
Gwen Margolis		(1934–2020)	2009	Member of Florida Senate	
Betty Schlesinger Sembler		(1931–2022)	2009	Anti-drug activist and wife of ambassador Mel Sembler, with whom she co-founded the drug treatment program Straight, Incorporated	
Barbara J. Pariente		(b. 1948)	2008	Former Chief Justice Florida Supreme Court	
Pallavi Patel		(b. 1950)	2008	Pediatrician, philanthropist who with her husband co-founded Carousel Elephants, the Patel Foundation for Global Understanding	
Ileana Ros-Lehtinen		(b. 1952)	2008	U.S. Representative House Committee on Foreign Affairs	
Maryly VanLeer Peck		(1930–2011)	2007	First female President of a Florida Community College at Polk Community College and founder of Guam Community College	
Peggy A. Quince		(b. 1948)	2007	Justice and former Chief Justice Supreme Court of Florida	
Caridad Asensio		(1931–2011)	2006	Farm worker advocate, founder Caridad Asensio Health Clinic, providing free health care for farm workers	
Tillie Kidd Fowler		(1942–2005)	2006	United States House of Representatives	
Lucy W. Morgan		(1940–2023)	2006	Journalist	
Shirley D. Coletti		(b. 1935)	2005	Co-founder of substance abuse program Operation PAR, Inc	
Judith Kersey		(b. 1943)	2005	Scientist, worked as an engineer in America's space program	
Marion P. Hammer		(b. 1939)	2005	First female President of National Rifle Association	
Sarah Ann Blocker		(1857–1944)	2003	co-founder of Florida Memorial College	
Gloria Estefan		(b. 1957)	2003	Entertainer	
Mary Grizzle		(1921–2006)	2003	Legislator, advocate of the Equal Rights Amendment; served in both houses of the Florida state legislature. At the end of her career as a representative, she was the longest-serving member of the legislature. She helped pass bills on waste water clean-up and on married women attaining full property rights without a husband's permission.	
Victoria Joyce Ely		(1889–1979)	2002	First licensed midwife in Florida; served in the Army Nurse Corps during World War I; pioneer in Florida nursing care	
Toni Jennings		(b. 1949)	2002	16th (and first female) Lieutenant Governor of Florida	
Frances Langford Stuart		(1913–2005)	2002	Entertainer	
Jessie Ball duPont		(1884–1970)	2001	Philanthropist	
Lynda Keever		(b. 1947)	2001	Publisher, CEO Florida Trend Magazine	
Lenore Carrero Nesbitt		(1932–2001)	2001	Nominated by President Ronald Reagan to a Federal judgeship	
Chris Evert		(b. 1954)	2000	Tennis pro	
Paula Hawkins		(1927–2003)	2000	First Florida female elected to the United States Senate	
Marianne Mathewson-Chapman		(b. 1948)	2000	First woman in the Army National Guard to attain rank of Major General	
Althea Gibson		(1927–2003)	1999	Champion tennis player, a pioneering African-American in the sport	
Sister Jeanne O'Laughlin		(1929–2019)	1999	First president of Barry University	
Dessie Smith Prescott		(1906–2002)	1999	First licensed female pilot in Florida, served in the Women's Army Corps in World War II, first female professional guide in Florida	
Helen Gordon Davis		(1926–2015)	1998	Florida state legislator, social activist	
Mattie Belle Davis		(1910–2004)	1998	Jurist who helped establish the Florida Association of Women Lawyers	
Christine Fulwylie-Bankston		(1916–1998)	1998	Poet, social activist, civil rights	
Alicia Baro		(1918–2012)	1997	Social and political activist	
Carita Doggett Corse		(1891–1978)	1997	Florida director of Federal Writers' Project	
M. Athalie Range		(1916–2006)	1997	Political activist, first African-American and second woman elected to the Miami City Council	
Marjorie Harris Carr		(1915–1998)	1996	Conservationist	
Betty Castor		(b. 1941)	1996	Former president of USF, member of J. William Fulbright Foreign Scholarship Board	
Ivy Julia Cromartie Stranahan		(1881–1971)	1996	Women's suffrage, social activist, environmental activist, helped Seminole tribe move to the Dania reservation	
Evelyn Stocking Crosslin		(1919–1991)	1995	Physician	
JoAnn Hardin Morgan		(b. 1940)	1995	First female engineer at NASA, first woman senior executive at Kennedy Space Center	
Sarah Brooks Pryor		(1877–1972)	1995	Civic activist, historic preservationist, known affectionately as "Aunt Frances"	
Nikki Beare		(1928–2014)	1994	Political and social activist, supported the Equal Rights Amendment	
Betty Mae Tiger Jumper		(1923–2011)	1994	First female chief of Seminole Tribe of Florida	
Gladys Nichols Milton		(1924–1999)	1994	Advocated midwives be recognized as medical practitioners	
Betty Skelton Frankman Erde		(1926–2011)	1993	Aerobatics championship aviator	
Paulina Pedroso		(1845–1925)	1993	Activist in the Cuban War of Independence	
Janet Reno		(1938–2016)	1993	Former Attorney General of the United States	
Jacqueline Cochran		(1910–1980)	1992	Aviator	
Carrie P. Meek		(1926–2021)	1992	United States House of Representatives	
Ruth Bryan Owen		(1885–1954)	1992	Florida's first female in the U.S. Congress, U.S. Ambassador to Denmark, appointed by President Franklin D. Roosevelt; daughter of William Jennings Bryan	
Annie Ackerman		(1914–1989)	1986	Political activist	
Rosemary Barkett		(b. 1939)	1986	Judge, U.S. Court of Appeals, appointed by President Bill Clinton	
Gwen Cherry		(1923–1979)	1986	Lawyer and legislator who introduced into the legislature the Equal Rights Amendment, Martin Luther King state holiday	
Dorothy Dodd		(1902–1994)	1986	Florida state archivist and state librarian	
Marjory Stoneman Douglas		(1890–1998)	1986	Everglades preservationist	
Elsie Jones Hare		(1903–1985)	1986	Educator	
Elizabeth McCullough Johnson		(1909–1973)	1986	Florida State Representative and Senator	
Frances Bartlett Kinne		(1917–2020)	1986	Educator, academic	
Arva Moore Parks McCabe		(1939–2020)	1986	Author, filmmaker	
Marjorie Kinnan Rawlings		(1896–1953)	1986	Author, won the Pulitzer Prize for The Yearling	
Florence Barbara Seibert		(1897–1991)	1986	Biochemist, inventor of the standard tuberculosistest	
Marilyn K. Smith		(1936–1985)	1986	Volunteerism	
Eartha M. M. White		(1876–1974)	1986	Humanitarian and educator who founded the Clara White Mission and the Eartha M.M. White Nursing Home	
Roxcy O'Neal Bolton		(1926–2017)	1984	Feminist, women's rights, founder Florida chapter of National Organization for Women	
Barbara Landstreet Frye		(1922–1982)	1984	Capitol Bureau Chief for United Press International	
Lena B. Smithers Hughes		(1910–1987)	1984	Botanist who developed virus-free strains of the Valencia orange	
Zora Neale Hurston		(1891–1960)	1984	Folklorist, anthropologist, and author	
Sybil Collins Mobley		(1925–2015)	1984	Dean of the School of Business and Industry at Florida A&M University	
Helen Muir		(1911–2006)	1984	Journalist, author of books on Florida	
Gladys Pumariega Soler		(1930–1993)	1984	Pediatrician	
Julia DeForest Sturtevant Tuttle		(1848–1898)	1984	Business woman, land owner of what became Miami, Florida	
Mary McLeod Bethune		(1875–1955)	1982	Civil rights leader	
Helene S. Coleman		(1925–2021)	1982	President of the National Council of Jewish Women	
Elaine Gordon		(1931–2000)	1982	Legislator	
Wilhelmina Celeste Goehring Harvey		(1912–2005)	1982	Mayor of Key West, Florida	
Paula Mae Milton		(1939–1980)	1982	Creative arts civic leader	
Barbara Jo Palmer		(b. 1949)	1982	Florida State University Director of Women's Intercollegiate Athletics	

== Additional sources ==
- "History News (Florida Women's Hall of Fame Awards)". The Florida Historical Quarterly. 65 (1). Florida Historical Quarterly: 139. July 1986. JSTOR 30146338.
- Clark, Donna; Haven, Kendall (1999). 100 Most Popular Scientists for Young Adults: Biographical Sketches and Professional Paths. Englewood, CO: Libraries Unlimited. ISBN 1-56308-674-3.
- Love, Barbara J.; Cott, Nancy F. (2006). Feminists Who Changed America, 1963–1975. Urbana, IL: University of Illinois Press. ISBN 978-0-252-03189-2.
- Patton, Charlie (December 1, 2005). "Hall of Fame Honor for the Late Tillie Fowler; Fowler, Caridad G. Asensio and Lucy W. Morgan Will Be Inducted into the Florida Women's Hall of Fame". The Florida Times Union. The Florida Times Union. Archived from the original on March 28, 2018 – via Questia.
- Perdue, Theda; Green, Michael D. (2001). The Columbia Guide to American Indians of the Southeast. New York: Columbia University Press. ISBN 0-231-11570-9.
- Ware, Susan; Brauckman, Stacy (2005). Notable American Women: A Biographical Dictionary, Volume 5. Belknap Press of Harvard University Press. ISBN 978-0-674-01488-6.
