= Victoria Joyce Ely =

American nurse (1889–1979)

- Born: September 12, 1889; Flora, Illinois, U.S.
- Died: May 12, 1979 (aged 89); Ruskin, Florida, U.S.
- Occupations: Nurse, midwife
- Known for: First licensed midwife in Florida

Victoria Joyce Ely (September 12, 1889 – May 12, 1979) was an American nurse who served in World War I in the Army Nurse Corps and then provided nursing services in the Florida Panhandle in affiliation with the American Red Cross. To address the high infant and maternal death rates in Florida in the 1920s, she lectured and worked at the state health office. Due to her work, training improved for birth attendants and death rates dropped. After 15 years in the state's service, she opened a rural health clinic in Ruskin, Florida, providing both basic nursing services and midwife care. The facility was renamed the Joyce Ely Health Center in her honor in 1954. In 1983, she was inducted into Florida Public Health Association's Hall of Memory and in 2002 was inducted into the Florida Women's Hall of Fame.

== Early life and education ==
Victoria Joyce Ely was born on September 12, 1889, in Flora, Illinois, the eldest child of Cora Lydia (née Hoff) and Harry S. Ely. She graduated from the Carrollton, Illinois, high school and then went to work as a stenographer and bookkeeper. In 1911, she began nursing studies in St. Louis, Missouri, at St. Luke's Hospital School for Nurses. Ely earned her nursing diploma in 1915.

== Career ==
After graduation, she began working at St. Luke's Hospital as ward supervisor and acting assistant superintendent of nurses. She also helped teach other nurses. In 1917, Ely joined the Army nurse Corporation and in May 1917 was placed at the Washington University Base Hospital Unit 21 on the active duty roster. She was mobilized to Rouen, France, for the duration of the war and did not return to the U.S. until June 1919. Upon her return, she entered the Teachers College at Columbia University in New York and undertook a course in Nurse Instruction. Completing her graduate course, she worked for a year as an instructor of nursing in Chicago and joined the American Red Cross.

In 1923, Ely was assigned to the Florida Panhandle to provide nursing services in Perry, Florida, at a cypress lumber company. Smallpox, malaria, typhoid, and hookworm were health problems in the mill town at that time and Ely provided vaccinations and basic health care training. Tuberculosis was also a serious threat, as was the lack of sanitary latrines. When Ely arrived, Perry had only one doctor. She began basic hygiene education, working with the state health officers and community leaders. The grateful town gave her a car, a house, and a maid, and she soon spread her teaching efforts to nearby areas.

Ely continued in the service of the Red Cross until 1930. The following year, with the passage of the state Midwife Practice Act, Ely was hired by the State Board of Health to head the midwifery training initiative. When she was hired, Florida's maternal death rate was cited at 10.2 per 1,000 births, and the infant mortality rate exceeded 61 per 1000 live births. While the attendance of midwives at births in Florida was 30 percent, more than double that of the rest of the country, and was 50 percent among the state's African American population, no training system was in place for birthing assistants. The more than 3000 women serving as midwives in Florida in the early 1920s were known as "granny midwives" for their lack of formal training.

Ely received a Rockefeller Foundation Fellowship in 1933 and used it to attend the Lobenstine School of Midwifery in New York. After completing her training, she returned to Florida and became the first licensed midwife in the state. She began a training program and a series of midwifery institutes to deal with the shortage of trained professionals. Many of her seminars were presented to minority groups, as the southern segregation policies created a lack of access to other education as well as adequate health services. She also implemented screening programs to test midwives for communicable diseases. Ely's efforts improved the health standards and maternal safety in Florida. She is credited with declines in both maternal and infant mortality in the period.

In 1944 Ely left the state health office and took a position with the Hillsborough County Health Department in Ruskin, Florida. The area was predominantly rural and health care was inaccessible to many residents. Ely established a health clinic in Ruskin, which was the only health care facility in the community, but had no doctor, and did not even have running water on site. As she had done previously in Perry, Ely provided immunizations, did health checks, and provided home visits. She issued health cards to certify workers' basic health for employment and attended home births. In 1953, a new facility was constructed in Ruskin, and in 1954 the Joyce Ely Health Center was dedicated in her honor. The facility was rebuilt in 1976 and continues to bear her name. Ely retired in 1957 and dedicated her time to gardening.

== Death and posthumous honors ==
Ely died on May 12, 1979, in Ruskin, Florida. Posthumously, she was inducted into Florida Public Health Association's Hall of Memory in 1983 and, in 2002, the Florida Women's Hall of Fame.
