= Leander J. Shaw Jr. =

American judge

Leander Jerry Shaw Jr.
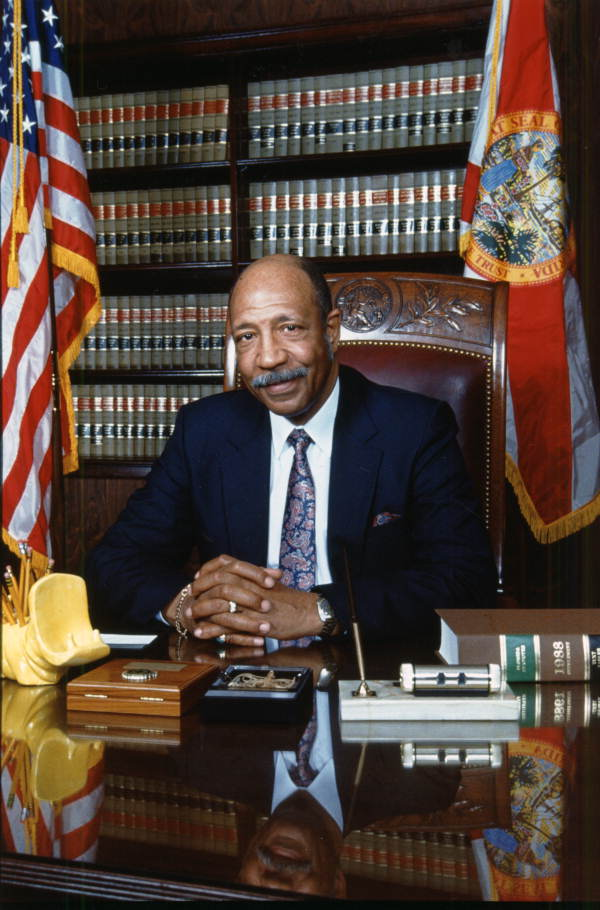
- Shaw in 1983

Chief Justice of the Florida Supreme Court
- In office July 1, 1990 – June 30, 1992
- Preceded by: Raymond Ehrlich
- Succeeded by: Rosemary Barkett

Justice of the Supreme Court of Florida
- In office 1983–2003

Personal details
- Born: September 6, 1930 Salem, Virginia, U.S.
- Died: December 14, 2015 (aged 85) Tallahassee, Florida, U.S.

Leander Jerry Shaw Jr. (September 6, 1930 – December 14, 2015) was an American jurist who served on the Florida Supreme Court from 1983 until 2003. He was chief justice from 1990 to 1992.

Born in Salem, Virginia, Shaw went to Lylburn Downing School in Lexington, Virginia. He graduated from West Virginia State University in 1952. He then served in the United States Army during the Korean War. In 1957, Shaw received his law degree from Howard University School of Law. In 1957, Shaw moved to Tallahassee, Florida, and was a law professor at Florida A&M University. He was admitted to the Florida bar in 1960 and practiced law in Jacksonville, Florida. Shaw served on the Florida State Attorney staff in 1969. In 1972, Shaw was appointed to the Florida Industrial Relations Commission. From 1979 to 1983, Shaw served on the Florida District Courts of Appeal. Shaw served on the Florida Supreme Court from 1983 until 2003 and was chief justice of that court from 1990 to 1992. He also served as judge in residence at Washington and Lee University School of Law in Lexington, Virginia. Shaw died on December 14, 2015, in Tallahassee at the age of 85. at the home of his daughter after a lengthy illness. He is survived by his three daughters, son, and grandchildren

== See also ==
- List of African-American jurists
