= Lucy Morgan =

American journalist (1940–2023)

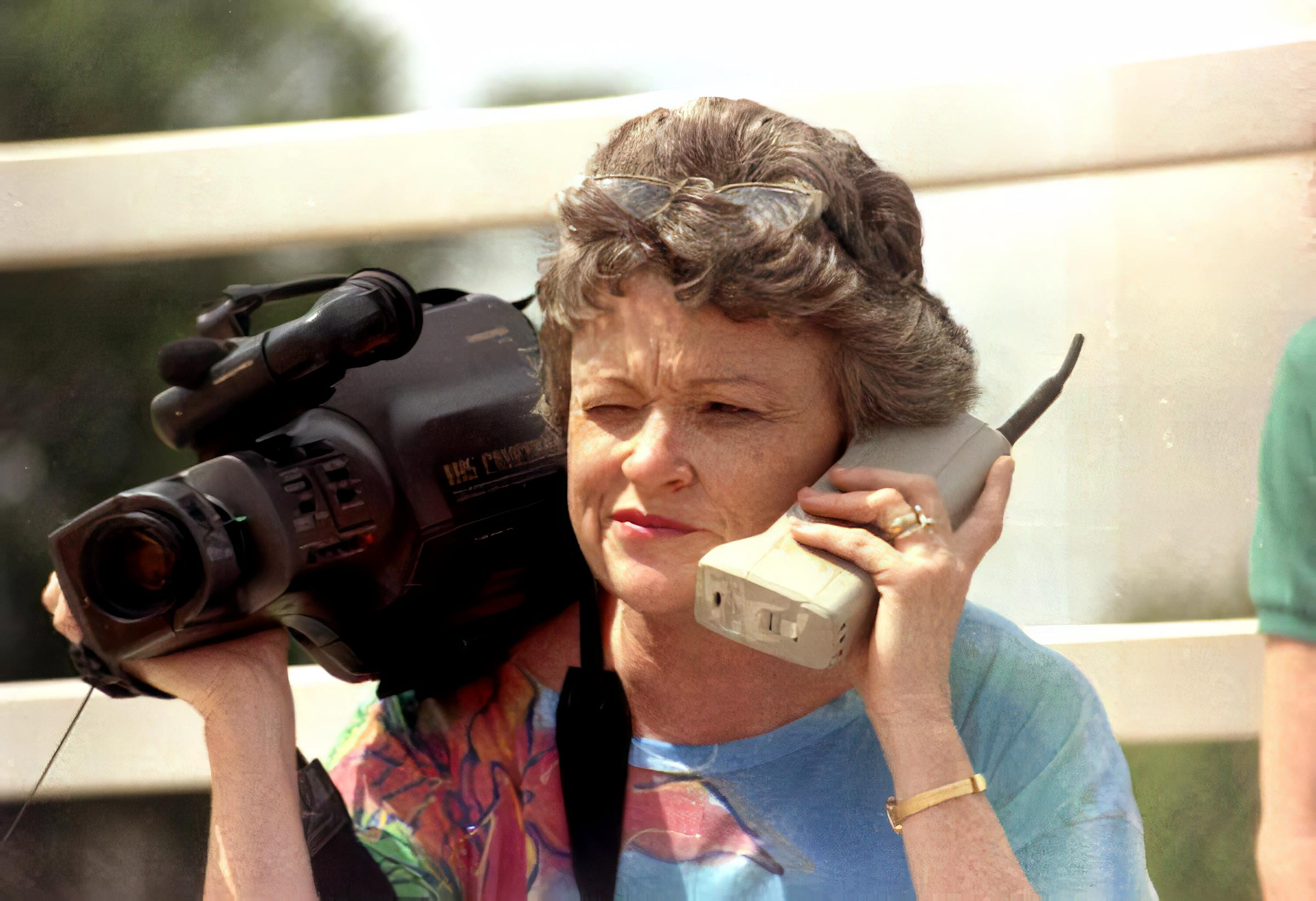
- Morgan, c. 1985
- Born: Lucile Bedford Keen; October 11, 1940; Memphis, Tennessee, U.S.
- Died: September 20, 2023 (aged 82); Tallahassee, Florida, U.S.
- Occupations: Reporter; journalist
- Spouses: Al Ware (div. 1966) Richard Morgan (m. 1968)
- Children: 3 (one deceased)

Lucy Ware Morgan (née Keen; October 11, 1940 – September 20, 2023) was an American long-time reporter and editorialist at the Tampa Bay Times (previously known as the St. Petersburg Times).

== Life and career ==
Born in Memphis, Tennessee on October 11, 1940, Morgan began her career at the Ocala Star Banner in 1965, and moved to the St. Petersburg Times in 1968. While working full-time as a reporter, she attended Pasco-Hernando State College and received her associate degree.

In 1985, she and Jack Reed shared the Pulitzer Prize for Investigative Reporting for their coverage of corruption in the Pasco County Sheriff's Office; she was the first woman to win a Pulitzer Prize in that category. In another case, in 1973, she was convicted of contempt for refusing to disclose a confidential source; the Florida Supreme Court overturned the conviction in 1976. In 1982 she was a Pulitzer finalist for her investigation of drug trafficking in north central Florida counties. She became Capital Bureau chief in Tallahassee in 1986 and later worked on special projects and as a columnist.

A 2012 All Things Considered profile described Morgan as "an institution in Florida". Seven years after her first announced retirement led to a continued active reporting career, she announced her full retirement in January 2013.

Morgan was inducted into the Florida Women's Hall of Fame in 2006. In 2005 the Florida State Senate renamed its press gallery in her honor.

Morgan's investigation into a $49.6 million mortgage fraud/Ponzi scheme in Glenville, North Carolina (where she was retired) by the Miami developer Domenico Rabuffo — while he was in the United States Federal Witness Protection Program — was the subject of the American Greed episode "Goodfella Gone Bad".

Lucy Morgan died in Tallahassee on September 20, 2023, following complications from a fall in May. She was 82.
