= Helen Aguirre Ferré =

American journalist (born 1957)

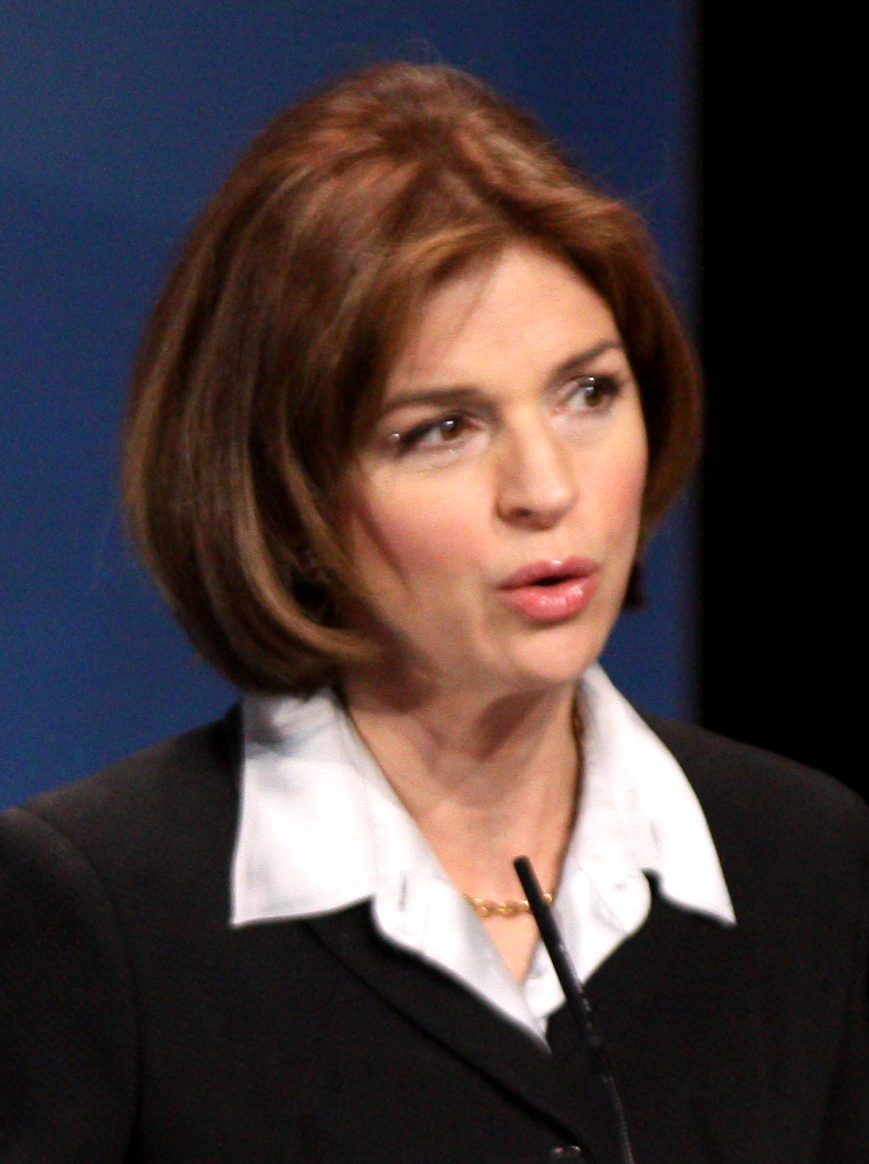
- Ferré in 2013

Executive Director of the Republican Party of Florida
- In office July 2020 – March 8, 2024
- Preceded by: George Riley
- Succeeded by: George Riley

Communications Director to the Governor of Florida
- In office January 2019 – July 2020
- Governor: Ron DeSantis
- Succeeded by: Fred Piccolo

NEA Director for Strategic Communications and Public Affairs
- In office August 2018 – December 2018
- President: Donald Trump

White House Director of Media Affairs
- In office January 23, 2017 – August 2018
- President: Donald Trump
- Preceded by: Position established

Personal details
- Born: 1957 (age 68–69) Miami, Florida, U.S.
- Party: Republican
- Education: Barry University (BA); University of Miami (MA)

Helen Aguirre Ferré (born 1957) is a Nicaraguan American journalist and the former executive director for the Republican Party of Florida. She previously served as Communications Director for Florida Governor Ron DeSantis. Aguirre Ferré was the Director for Strategic Communications and Public Affairs at the National Endowment for the Arts from August to December 2018 and the White House's Director of Media Affairs from January 2017 to August 2018. Prior to that, she hosted the public affairs program Issues on WPBT 2.

== Career ==
Aguirre Ferré was an op-ed columnist for the Miami Herald. She hosted a Spanish-language talk radio show on Univision America until 2015.

Aguirre Ferré is a former Opinion Page Editor of Diario Las Americas.

Aguirre Ferré was the first female President of the District Board of Trustees of Miami Dade College. She declined to run for re-election as chair of MDC's board of trustees amid pressure from immigration activists. Ferré's decision came after local and national immigrant advocacy groups launched online petitions calling on her to step down from her chairmanship or resign from the board altogether, citing Donald Trump's "anti-Hispanic hate" and "anti-immigrant agenda." The college has a large immigrant student population. She remains on the board.

Aguirre Ferré was senior adviser to Jeb Bush's presidential campaign in 2016. In June 2016, Aguirre Ferré was named Hispanic communications director for the Republican Party.

Aguirre Ferré was named to the Florida Women's Hall of Fame in 2016.

Aguirre Ferré was the executive director for the Republican Party of Florida from 2020 to 2024.

=== Early criticism of candidate Donald Trump ===
Aguirre Ferré had initially been a harsh critic of candidate Donald Trump. "There's a side of Donald Trump that is anti-feminine. I'm not going to tell you he's a misogynist … but I do think there's something that bothers him about strong and independent women," she said in April 2016. "In the case of abortion, Donald Trump held every viewpoint possible … including supporting partial-birth abortion, something even many who are pro-choice oppose," she said of Trump the same month.

Trump "babbling more than usual," Aguirre Ferré tweeted during a Republican presidential debate on February 13, 2016. She criticized New Jersey Governor Chris Christie's and U.S. Senator Jeff Sessions' decision to endorse Trump, tweeting on February 29, 2016, "Wonder if Chris Christie and Senator Sessions now regret supporting Trump or do means justify the end? Telling either way." Following a violent protest at a Trump rally in Chicago, she blamed Trump for the violence, tweeting "Thank you! Ted Cruz and Marco Rubio agree that Trump bears responsibility for violence in Chicago today." On September 10, 2015, she tweeted that "women and country deserve better" than Trump.

== Trump administration ==
On January 19, 2017, it was announced that she would be special assistant to President Trump and director of media affairs for the Trump administration. It was announced on August 9, 2018, that Aguirre Ferré "was taking up a new position as director for strategic communications and public affairs at the National Endowment for the Arts... in the next two weeks." In December 2019, Florida Governor-elect Ron DeSantis announced Ferré's appointment as director of communications.

== Personal ==
Aguirre Ferré was born in Miami, to Nicaraguan parents. She is the daughter-in-law of the late former Miami mayor Maurice Ferré.
