= James E. Alderman =

American judge (1936–2021)

James Elliott Alderman
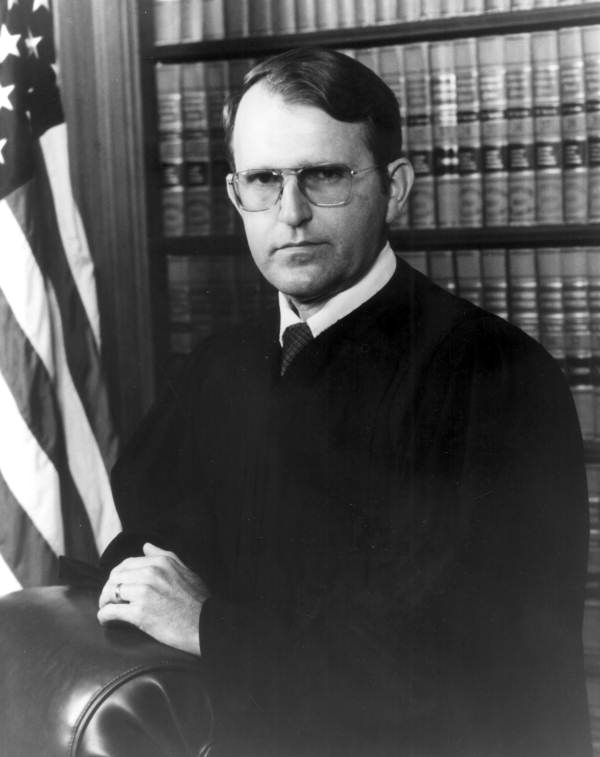

Justice of the Florida Supreme Court
- In office April 5, 1978 – 1985
- Preceded by: Frederick B. Karl
- Succeeded by: Rosemary Barkett

Personal details
- Born: November 1, 1936 Fort Pierce, Florida, U.S.
- Died: June 10, 2021 (aged 84) Vero Beach, Florida, U.S.
- Education: University of Florida; University of Florida Law School

James Elliott Alderman (November 1, 1936 – June 10, 2021) served a six-year term as justice for the Florida Supreme Court from 1978 to 1985, retiring after a personal tragedy forced his return home to tend the family business. Alderman's term notably came about as one of the first appointed justices after an amendment abolished direct elections for vacancies. He died in Vero Beach, Florida, on June 10, 2021.

== Early life and education ==
A sixth-generation Floridian, Alderman attended Fort Pierce High School and grew up working on the family ranch. The Aldermans raised cattle in St. Lucie county since 1830, well before Florida achieved statehood in 1845.

== Public Service ==
Alderman's first foray into public service began when Governor picked Alderman to serve as a County judge for St. Lucie County 1971. Five years later, Alderman successfully ran for St. Lucie county circuit judge in 1976, and was soon appointed to the 4th District Court of Appeal in West Palm Beach by Governor later that year.

Alderman was one of the first justices appointed by the Governor under the new constitutional amendment that ended the direct election of supreme court justices to six-year terms. A later constitutional amendment modified the provisions regarding term limits so that appointees face a retention election instead, which Alderman won.

Political offices
Preceded by Frederick B. Karl	Justice of the Florida Supreme Court; 1978–1985	Succeeded by Rosemary Barkett
