= Nathan W. Collier =

American academic administrator

Nathan W. Collier (1872–1941) was an American academic administrator who served as president of Florida Baptist Institute and then Florida Normal and Technical Institute from 1896 onward. Florida Baptist Institute was established by Collier and Sarah Ann Blocker, who combined Florida Baptist Institute and Florida Baptist Academy to form it. Collier was president of the historically black college from 1896 to 1941. The institution later was developed and renamed as Florida Memorial University.

Collier was from Augusta, Georgia. He graduated from Ware High School and Atlanta University. Collier was involved in the latter school's move from Jacksonville to Georgia.

== Legacy and honors ==
Collier-Blocker Junior College was named for him and Blocker. The Nathan W. Collier Library at Florida Memorial University is also named for him. The university gives an annual award for service to it in his name.

The Collier-Blocker-Puryear Park in St. Augustine, Florida was also named for the university's founders.
