= Susan Benton =

American civil servant

- Born: 1960 (age 65–66); Florida, United States
- Education: St. Thomas University, Troy State
- Occupations: Former Sheriff of Highlands County, Florida
- Known for: First woman elected sheriff in the state of Florida

Susan Benton is a civil servant and served as sheriff of Highlands County, Florida from 2005 to 2017. She was the first woman to be elected sheriff in the state of Florida, first woman to become president of the Florida Sheriff's Association in 2013, and was appointed to serve on the National Sheriffs' Association Board of Directors. She has been an instructor in Public Administration at Barry University, for the Office of the Attorney General, and for the Florida Departments of Juvenile Justice and Law Enforcement. In 2014, Susan Benton was inducted into the Florida Women's Hall of Fame.

== Sheriff of Highlands County ==
Susan Benton was elected sheriff of Highlands County in 2004 by a 60% margin and was reelected for three consecutive terms. During her time as sheriff, Susan Benton was appointed to serve on the National Sheriffs' Association Board of Directors. She retired from the position in 2017.
