= Elaine Gordon =

American politician (1931–2000)

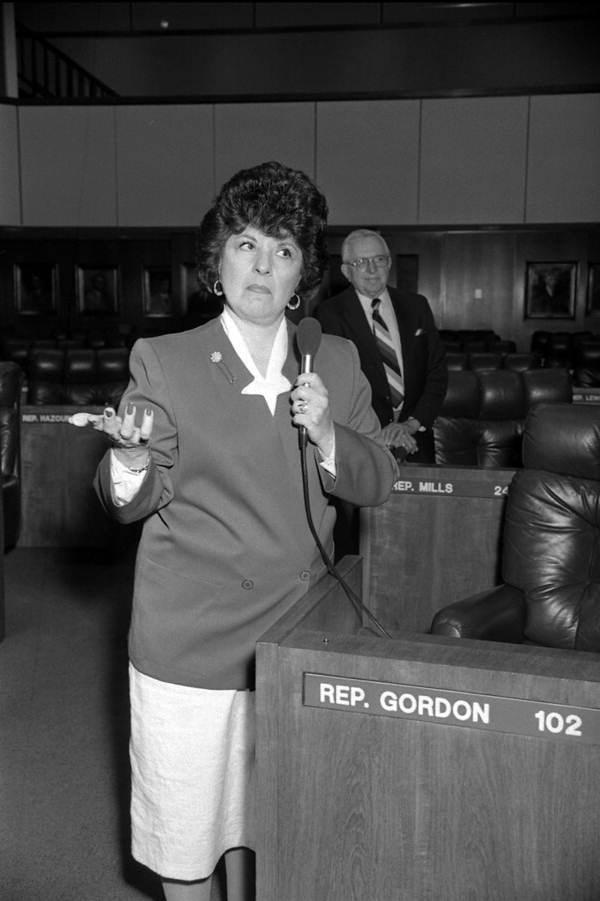
Representative Gordon speaks to the House, 1986.

Elaine Gordon (1931 – February 25, 2000) was an American politician. She served in the Florida House of Representatives from 1972 to 1994 as a Democrat.

She was born in The Bronx, New York and moved to Florida in 1964. During the constitutional revision session for the state in 1968, she was legislative assistant to George Firestone. She was elected to the Florida House of Representatives for North Miami-Dade County in 1972. She sponsored the bills which created the Florida Commission on the Status of Women, the 1989 hate crime law and the Patients Bill of Rights. She helped introduce legislation that protected women and children by enforcing child support and protecting against domestic violence. Gordon served as Speaker Pro-Tempore (acting speaker) for the state assembly. In 1992, she was named Dean of the Florida House. She retired from the Florida legislature in 1994.

She worked on the unsuccessful ratification of the Equal Rights Amendment in Florida; although the amendment passed in the House of Representatives several times, it was defeated in the Florida Senate.

After her divorce, Gordon was unable to get a credit card in her name since she was a woman. As a result, she campaigned with American feminist and journalist Nikki Beare to found a statewide feminist credit union. She worked with Beare and Elaine Bloom on WKAT Radio with a feminist radio show titled Women's Powerline.

Gordon was a founding member of the National Organization for Women (NOW) and of the Florida Women's Political Caucus. In 1982, she became the first person inducted into the Florida Women's Hall of Fame. She was the first recipient of the Humanitarian Award from the United Way of Florida. After leaving politics, she served as assistant vice-president at Florida International University.

She died of non-Hodgkin lymphoma at the age of 68.

In 1999, Florida International University established the Elaine Gordon Scholarship in her honor. She was the mother of television producer J. Brian Gadinsky. She was Jewish.
