= Barbara Jo Palmer =

American sports advocate (born 1949)

Barbara Jo Palmer (born 1949) is an American sports advocate.

== Education ==
Palmer earned her Bachelor of Arts and master's degree at Florida State University (FSU) in 1970 and 1974.

== Career ==
After earning her master's degree, Palmer accepted a position at Impact Enterprises Inc., and later became a recreation supervisor in Merritt Island. On August 3, 1977, Palmer replaced Marlene Furnell as FSU Women's Athletic Director. Upon her appointment, Palmer also inherited the $1 million deficit as she struggled to financially support women's intercollegiate teams without a full-time coach. As a result, she was an active lobbyist with the Association for Intercollegiate Athletics for Women which eventually convinced the Florida government to budget $2.8 million towards women collegiate programs at eight universities. Under her directorship, FSU women's collegiate teams won five national championships and 226 All-American awards. By 1982, she was inducted into the Florida Women's Hall of Fame for her lobbying activities. From 1984 until 1985, she sat on the board of directors for the Council of Collegiate Women Athletic Administrators.

In 1990, she was inducted into Florida State University's Hall of Fame. Five years later, she was shortlisted for the opportunity to become FSUs Athletic Director. In 2007, she was recipient of a lifetime achievement award from the National Association of Collegiate Women Athletics Administrators.

In 2011, Palmer was appointed to Chief of Staff with the Agency for Persons with Disabilities. She later became its director upon appointment from Governor Rick Scott in August 2012.
