= Rosemary Barkett =

American judge (born 1939)

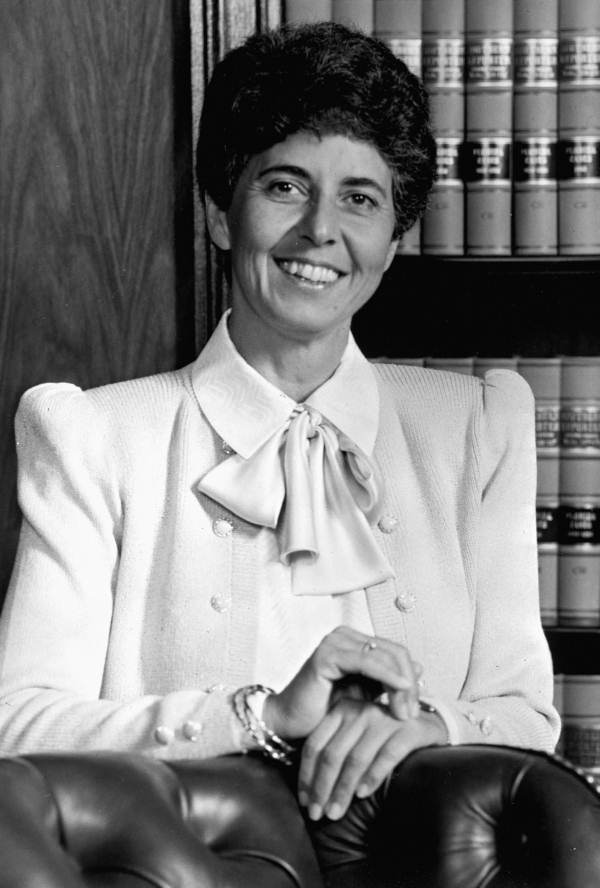

Judge of the United States Court of Appeals for the Eleventh Circuit
- In office April 15, 1994 – September 30, 2013
- Appointed by: Bill Clinton
- Preceded by: Paul Hitch Roney
- Succeeded by: Robin S. Rosenbaum

Chief Justice of the Florida Supreme Court
- In office July 1, 1992 – April 21, 1994
- Preceded by: Leander J. Shaw Jr.
- Succeeded by: Stephen H. Grimes

Justice of the Supreme Court of Florida
- In office November 15, 1985 – April 21, 1994
- Appointed by: Bob Graham
- Preceded by: James E. Alderman
- Succeeded by: Harry Lee Anstead

Personal details
- Born: Rosemary Barakat; August 29, 1939 (age 87) Ciudad Victoria, Mexico
- Education: Saint Joseph College of Florida (AA); Spring Hill College (BS); University of Florida (JD)

Rosemary Barkett (née Barakat; born August 29, 1939) is an American lawyer and jurist serving as a judge of the Iran–United States Claims Tribunal at The Hague since 2013. Previously, she served as a Federal judge of the United States Court of Appeals for the Eleventh Circuit and was the 45th chief justice of Florida from 1992 to 1994.

Born in Mexico to parents who were emigrants from Syria, she is recognized as the first woman, Arab American, and Hispanic judge (of Syrian descent) on the Supreme Court of Florida.

== Background ==
Born Rosemary Barakat in Ciudad Victoria, Tamaulipas, Mexico, Barkett was the daughter of Syrian immigrants from Zaidal, Assad and Mariam Barakat. Barkett's parents had seven children who survived to adulthood. In January 1946, when Barkett was six, her entire family immigrated to Miami, Florida. As a native of Mexico by birth, Barakat spoke only Spanish until she moved to Miami. Upon arriving in Miami, the family anglicised their surname to Barkett. Barkett became a United States citizen in 1958 at the age of 18.

At age 17, Barkett joined the Sisters of St. Joseph, becoming a nun. While in the Order, she received an Associate of Arts degree from Saint Joseph College of Florida. From 1960 to 1968, she taught elementary school and junior high school classes in Tampa, Jacksonville and St. Augustine. Years later, in 1990, she told the Orlando Sentinel that the convent was "like a sorority, without the parties."

Barkett left the convent in 1967, the same year that she received her Bachelor of Science degree from Spring Hill College, summa cum laude. She went on to law school at the University of Florida in 1970, where she was the first woman to win the Miller Memorial award for outstanding senior graduate.

== Florida Supreme Court ==
After nearly a decade in private practice, Barkett was appointed as a state circuit court judge in 1979 by Governor Bob Graham. She advanced to higher judicial offices, as the Chief Judge of the Fifteenth Judicial Circuit of the State of Florida and as an Appellate Judge on the Fourth District Court of Appeal of the State of Florida in 1984. The following year she was appointed by Governor Graham to the Florida Supreme Court, the first woman to serve in this position. In 1992 she was chosen by her colleagues to become the state's first woman chief justice.

As Florida's first female Supreme Court Justice, her appointment highlighted a number of gender-bias issues within the institution. Prior to her appointment, the floor where justices' chambers were located in the Supreme Court Building had only two restrooms, one marked "Justices," the other marked "Ladies." In addition to that change, her tenure ended the use of the title "Mr. Justice." Barkett was to be called "Madam Justice Barkett," which she felt was inappropriate because she was not married and "did not qualify for the other definition of Madam." Instead she requested to be addressed simply as "Justice Barkett." The other justices followed suit and dropped "Mr." from their titles.

To remain on the state Supreme Court, Barkett survived a rancorous merit retention election in 1992, receiving a favorable vote of 61 percent. During that battle, organizations such as the National Rifle Association of America and Florida Right to Life developed negative advertising campaigns.

== Eleventh Circuit Court of Appeals ==
On September 24, 1993, President Bill Clinton nominated Barkett to a seat on the United States Court of Appeals for the Eleventh Circuit (which reviews cases from Florida, Alabama, and Georgia). The seat had been vacated by Judge Paul Hitch Roney.

Barkett's nomination was hotly contested by newspaper columnists and such conservative politicians as Orrin Hatch, who was, at the time, the ranking Republican on the Senate Judiciary Committee. As described in The New York Times, the left-leaning magazine Mother Jones, and a 2014 book, The Biblical Truth About America's Death Penalty, much of the focus was on Barkett's supposedly being soft on crime. The opposition focused on her being against the death penalty, though she had affirmed the death penalty 275 times while on the state supreme court.

In a 1994 New York Times op-ed, Anna Quindlen described how Barkett was Borked by such senators as Strom Thurmond, who "spelled out the gory details of every murder case in which the Chief Justice had voted to overturn death sentences."

Barkett was eventually confirmed by the Democratic-controlled United States Senate by a 61–37 vote. She received her commission on April 15, 1994.

Between 1994 and 1996, a wide range of conservative politicians made explicit use of Barkett in political attack ads that tried to connect her with their political opponents. For example, in a Tennessee senate race, Bill Frist upset the incumbent Jim Sasser after emphasizing that Sasser had voted to confirm Barkett for the seat on the Court of Appeals. In a California Senate race, Michael Huffington took out full-page newspaper ads outlining ways in which Barkett was a liberal activist judge, and linking Barkett with his opponent in that race, Dianne Feinstein, who had also voted for Barkett's confirmation. While trying to paint Bill Clinton as soft on crime, the Republican presidential nominee Bob Dole included Barkett among 4 judges in his "judicial Hall of Shame." As pointed out in an NYU law review article, Barkett rendered 12,000 decisions and wrote 3000 opinions while on the state bench, but most of these attack ads focused on a single dissent in which the opinion was written by another member of the court. In addition, while being reviewed, Barkett was supported by Florida's Fraternal Order of Police, the Patrolmen's Benevolent Association, and the Correctional Peace Officers Association.

U.S. Appeals Court judges tend to hear appeals in groups of three, and Judge Barkett—considered one of the few liberal judges among the twelve Appeals Court judges in her three-state region—is perhaps best known for her dissenting opinions after having been outvoted by 2–1. For example, Warren Hill had been convicted of murder and sentenced to death. After sentencing, additional evidence arose that indicated he was intellectually disabled, which—if true—would have precluded a lawful execution. As quoted in The New York Times and The American Prospect, Barkett's 2013 dissent included the following: "The idea that courts are not permitted to acknowledge that a mistake has been made which would bar an execution is quite incredible for a country that not only prides itself on having the quintessential system of justice but attempts to export it to the world as a model of fairness." Hill was executed in 2014.

Barkett was twice outvoted when the 11th Circuit Court refused to hear appeals after lawyers for death row inmates missed deadlines. As she said in one dissent: "It is unjust and inequitable to require death row inmates to suffer the consequences of their attorneys' negligence." The United States Supreme Court took up both of these cases (Maples v. Thomas and Holland v. Florida) and then overturned both of the decisions, essentially agreeing with Barkett's dissent.

In 2004, the 12 judges of the Eleventh District voted 6–6 to not review a Florida case regarding adoption by gay parents. The tie meant the case would not be reviewed. Jeb Bush, the Florida governor, praised the decision, indicating that the court decision "validates Florida's conclusion that it's in the best interest of adopted children to be in homes anchored by both a father and a mother." Barkett's dissent pointed out that only gay people were excluded from adoption, that there is no rule forbidding child molesters and domestic abusers from adoption. As quoted in The Advocate, Barkett's dissent underlined the disparity: "In a very real sense, Florida's adoption statute treats homosexuals less favorably than even those individuals with characteristics that may pose a threat to the well-being of children." After noting that Florida allows single people to adopt and allows gays to be permanent foster parents, Barkett continued, "in the context of adoption, this disparity of treatment on the face of the statute amounts to the purest form of irrationality."

In 2008, Barkett dissented in a case that involved Florida's system for purging the voting lists (Florida State Conference of the NAACP v. Browning). As discussed in The New York Review of Books, Barkett's written dissent underlined the disparate racial impact of the Florida plan: while black voters made up 13 percent of the scanned pool, they comprised 26 percent of those who were purged. White voters, meanwhile, comprised 66 percent of the pool, but only 17 percent of the rejected group.

In 2011, Barkett wrote the Appeals Court decision that found that discrimination against transgender individuals qualifies as unconstitutional sex-based discrimination (Glenn v. Brumby). Judge Bill Pryor joined Barkett in the 2-1 majority. This became problematic for Pryor in 2017, when this decision was used against him when he was considered for the U.S. Supreme Court by President Donald Trump.

Barkett retired from the court, effective September 30, 2013, in order to accept a post on an international tribunal.

Even as she left the federal bench, Barkett inspired controversy. The insider web site law.com glowingly concluded that Barkett was "in a class by herself," while the conservative magazine National Review celebrated the end of "Rosemary Barkett's 34-year Reign of Error in the American judiciary."

== Iran–United States Claims Tribunal ==
Barkett joined the Iran–United States Claims Tribunal on October 1, 2013, having been selected by the United States Department of State for the post. The Tribunal is located in The Hague, Netherlands.

== International Court of Justice ==
In July 2022, Barkett was appointed by the United States to serve as a Judge ad hoc on the International Court of Justice (World Court) in Certain Iranian Assets (Islamic Republic of Iran v. United States of America).

== Teaching and outside activity ==
While serving on the federal bench, Barkett long taught a seminar on Human Rights and Comparative Constitutions at Columbia Law School with Professor Louis Henkin. Barkett also served on the faculties of Florida's Judicial College, the National Judicial College, The Institute of Judicial Administration's New Appellate Judge Seminar, and the Aspen Institute. She has given lectures in countries throughout the world, including Syria, Qatar, Turkey, South Africa, Algeria, China, Haiti, Khyrgystan, and Mexico.

Since leaving the Federal bench, Barkett's academic focus has been on justice and human rights. For example, she gave the 2015 Madison Lecture at New York University's law school, where she described how the U.S. lags behind their international peers with regards to protecting women and children's human rights.

In 2016, Barkett and another former chief justice of the Florida Supreme Court Harry Lee Anstead joined with other senior attorneys to submit a brief on a death penalty case, in which they argued that the state's death penalty law was unconstitutional. As outlined in the Miami Herald, they argued that 390 people on Florida's death row should have their penalties reduced to life in prison.

Barkett served as the 2015-16 Scholar in Residence at the Sorensen Center for International Peace and Justice at the law school at the City University of New York. She serves on the Board of Measures for Justice, an organization dedicated to bringing greater transparency to the legal system. Barkett is also the honorary president of the American Society of International Law.

== Honors ==
Barkett has won dozens of awards and has been awarded seven honorary degrees.

Two awards are given in her honor each year. The Rosemary Barkett Award is presented annually by the Academy of Florida Trial Lawyers to recognize efforts to provide equal justice. The Rosemary Barkett Outstanding Achievement Award is given annually by the Florida Association of Women Lawyers.

The Rosemary Barkett Appellate Inn of Court was founded in 2010 by Florida International University, the Third District Court of Appeal, and the American Inns of Court Program.

The Judge Rosemary Barkett Litigation Program was created in 2017 by the Americans for Immigrant Justice, a not-for-profit legal assistance organization that seeks to protect and promote the basic human rights of immigrants.

Barkett has served on dozens of boards and national/international committees. She was inducted into the Florida Women's Hall of Fame in 1986 and was a long-time member of the Board of Trustees of Barry University.

Barkett is also featured in a non-fiction children's book, A Kid's Guide to Arab-American History, alongside a description of immigration patterns and a recipe for making hummus.

== See also ==
- List of female state supreme court justices
- List of Hispanic and Latino American jurists

Legal offices
| Preceded by James E. Alderman | Justice of the Florida Supreme Court; 1985–1994 | Succeeded by Harry Lee Anstead |
| Preceded by Leander J. Shaw Jr. | Chief Justice of the Florida Supreme Court; 1992–1994 | Succeeded by Charles T. Wells |
| Preceded by Paul Hitch Roney | Judge of the United States Court of Appeals for the Eleventh Circuit; 1994–2013 | Succeeded by Robin S. Rosenbaum |
