= Dottie Berger MacKinnon =

American children's advocate

Dottie Berger MacKinnon (1942–2013) was a lifelong children's advocate who raised millions to establish safe havens for at-risk kids. She was a Hillsborough County Commissioner from 1994–1998, serving as its chairman from 1996–1997. She was the co-founder of Joshua House and Friends of Joshua House in 1992, a temporary safe location in Lutz for abused and unwanted children. She helped to create a $1.2 million endowment to ensure that it continues. She also established A Kid's Place in 2009, a 60-bed temporary location for foster-care to help siblings to stay together. She was on the board of directors at Tampa General Hospital from 2000 to 2007. On May 4, 2011, she received the Ellsworth G. Simmons Good Government Award by the Hillsborough County Commissioners. She also received the annual award that year from Hood Simply Smart Milk and the League of Women Voters. In 2012, she received the “Woman of Influence Award” from the Greater Tampa Chamber of Commerce. In 2013, she was posthumously inducted into the Florida Women's Hall of Fame.
