= Gladys Nichols Milton =

American midwife

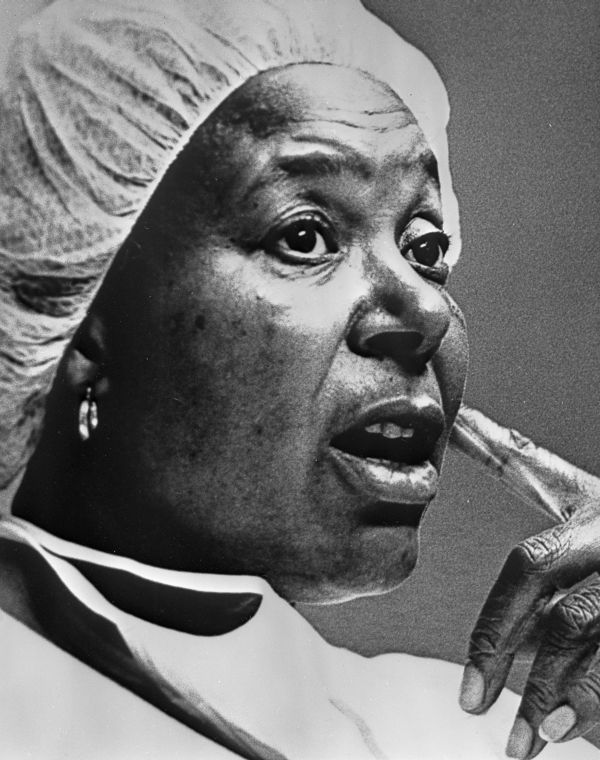
- Born: Gladys Delores Nichols; 1924; Walton County, Florida
- Died: 1999
- Occupation: midwife

Gladys Nichols Milton (1924 – 1999) was a Florida midwife and advocate for women's health. She was inducted into the Florida Women's Hall of Fame in 1994.

== Early life ==
Gladys Delores Nichols was born at Caney Creek in Walton County, Florida. She was licensed to practice midwifery in 1959, after training with two doctors in Florala, Alabama; her training sponsored the Walton County Health Department.

== Career ==
Gladys Nichols Milton delivered at least 2000 babies (possibly as many as 3000) in her career as a midwife. She established the clinic now known as Eleanor Milton Memorial Birthing Center in Laurel Hill, Florida in 1976. In the 1980s she was active in the effort to keep traditional midwifery legal in Florida; as a result of her visibility, her clinic and home were the targets of arson. The state closed her clinic temporarily, and suspended her license in the 1980s, as health code standards changed.

Milton was also interested in literacy in her community, and worked for years to have a library built in north Walton County. After her death, a branch of the county library was established in Paxton, and named for Milton in honor of her efforts.

Milton wrote two published memoirs, Why Not Me? (1993, with Wendy Bovard), and Beyond the Storm (1997, with Christine Fulwylie-Bankston).

== Personal life and legacy ==
Gladys Nichols Milton was herself the mother of seven children. She died in 1999, aged 75 years.

In 1992, she was honored with the Sage Femme, an award of the Midwives Alliance of North America (MANA). In 1994, she was inducted into the Florida Women's Hall of Fame. In 2001, she was inducted into the Okaloosa County Hall of Fame. Her daughter Maria Milton continued her work after she died. In 2015 Gladys Milton was named a “Woman of Light” by the DeFuniak Springs Woman’s Club.
