= Sarah Brooks Pryor =

American civic activist and historic preservationist

Sarah Frances Brooks Pryor (June 1, 1877 – July 20, 1972), known as "Aunt Frances", was an American civic activist and historic preservationist in Florida.

Pryor was born in an Okaloosa County log cabin and rowed a boat to school. She became a teacher, a postmaster of Fort Walton Beach and eventually the operator of the historic hotel, the Indianola Inn. President Woodrow Wilson appointed her in 1917 as a postmaster and she served until 1943. She founded and was president of the Woman's Club of Fort Walton Beach. She was the founder and active member of the Frances Pryor Camellia Society for beautification projects in her area. She was the originator of the Blue Star Marker at the Temple Mound Museum which commemorates those who died in World War II.

Pryor died in Okaloosa County in 1972 and was elected to the Florida Women's Hall of Fame in 1995 and her name is displayed in the Florida State Capitol.
