= Evelyn Stocking Crosslin =

American physician

- Born: February 28, 1919; Daytona Beach, Florida, US
- Died: January 25, 1991 (aged 71); Daytona Beach, Florida, US
- Occupation: Physician

Doctor Evelyn Stocking Crosslin (1919–1991) was an American physician. She was named to the Florida Women's Hall of Fame in 1995.

== Life ==
She was born Evelyn Stocking in Daytona Beach to father Dr. John T. Stocking and mother Daisy Stocking Park. She has three grandchildren: Marjorie, Neil, Jr., and Hardy Crosslin. She was educated at Bethune-Cookman College. Because African-Americans were not admitted to Florida medical schools at the time, she earned her MD from Meharry Medical College in Tennessee. She was the first African-American woman to practice medicine in Volusia County. She married Doctor Neill Crosslin. Crosslin practised 47 years at the Halifax Medical Center in Daytona Beach. She also operated her own practice and worked at the Daytona Beach Public Health Unit's Well Baby Clinic for 30 years.

Crosslin and her husband have been credited with providing quality medical services to people who couldn't afford private medical care. The Halifax Crosslin Health Center was opened in 1994 to honor their contributions; fees at the center are set based on income.

== Community involvement ==
Aside from her work as a physician, Crosslin was also involved in the community as a member of a historically black sorority, Alpha Kappa Alpha, specifically in the Gamma Mu Omega Chapter as Health Chair Committee.
