= Museum van de Vrouw, Echt =

Women's Museum, Echt
- Museum van de Vrouw
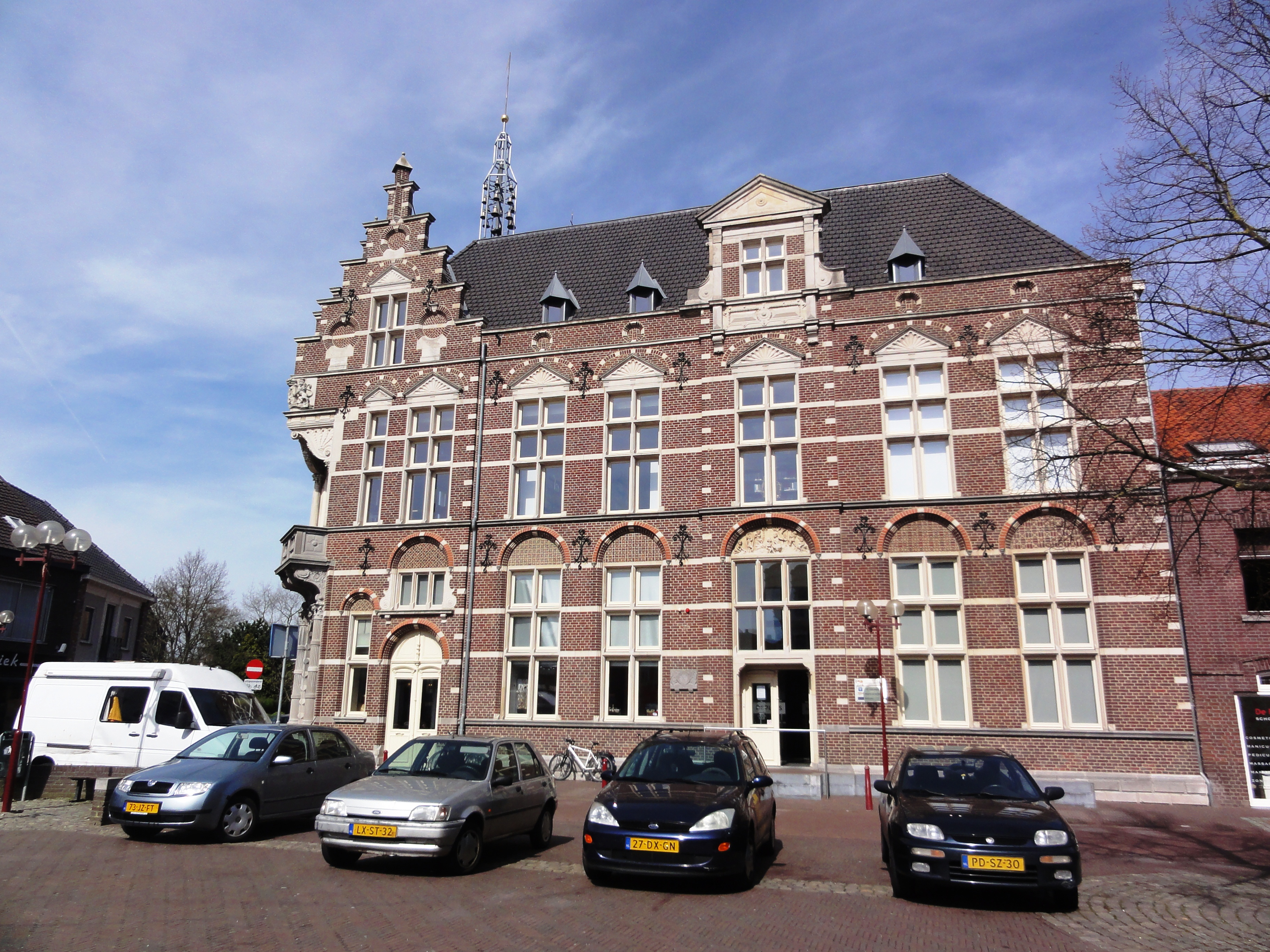
- The Museum of Women is located in the former town hall of Echt, presently the Edith Stein Culture House.
- Established: 2007
- Location: Echt, Netherlands
- Coordinates: 51.106°N 5.867°E
- Type: Art museum
- Website: http://www.museumvandevrouw.nl/

The Museum van de Vrouw (The Museum of Women) is a museum dedicated to all aspects of women and their lives located in Echt in the Netherlands. The museum houses contemporary exhibits, and particularly highlights issues that characterize femininity, its struggles, and connects traditions with contemporary themes. The museum also focuses on local and regional culture and history.

== Description ==
The museum was created in 2007 after the Echt-Susteren commune acquired a private collection. The museum is housed in the former town hall of Echt, which was renamed in 2019 as the Edith Stein Culture House (Cultuurhuis Edith Stein). The first floor displays a cabinet of curiosities and a permanent exhibition contains the history of the municipality of Echt-Susteren, in addition to a key collection. The building's great hall is used for temporary exhibitions.
