= Florida Commission on the Status of Women =

Nonpartisan board of Florida

The Florida Commission on the Status of Women (FCSW) is a nonpartisan board established in 1991 with a focus of raising awareness and celebrating the contributions and success of all Floridians. They provide a collaborative platform for those seeking information on issues that affect women, girls and families in Florida. FCSW members serve by appointment and the commission is housed at the Office of the Attorney General of Florida. Their goal is to provide communication, promotion, and collaboration among hundreds of organizations working in all 67 counties that are focused on the welfare of the women of Florida.

== History ==
Governor Lawton Chiles lobbied the Florida Legislature to statutorily create the Florida Commission on the Status of Women after he took office in 1991. The leading sponsor in the House of Representatives for CS/CS/HB 109 was Representative Elaine Gordon, while Senator Carrie Meek sponsored the companion bill, SB 1324. The commission's legislative authority now exists in Section 14.24, Florida Statutes. Since 1991, the Florida Commission on the Status of Women has been fully supported by the Governor, the Cabinet and the Florida Legislature.

== Events ==
The Commission oversees two awards: the Florida Women's Hall of Fame, an honor roll of women who have contributed to life for citizens of Florida, and the Florida Achievement Award for individuals who have improved the lives of women and girls in Florida.

=== Florida Women's Hall of Fame ===
An awards ceremony for the Florida Women's Hall of Fame was first held in 1982 and recipient names are displayed in the Florida State Capitol. Since 1992, up to three women have been inducted into the Hall each year. Nominations are made between April 1 and July 15 of each year. These nominations are carefully reviewed by members of the FCSW who then propose 10 finalists to the Governor who selects the final inductees each year.

=== Florida Women's Day at The Capitol ===
More than 130 women and organizations travel to Tallahassee to participate in Florida Women's Day at the Capitol. This annual event brings together legislators, public policy experts, members of community organizations, and the public in order to inform and motivate women to engage in the legislative process, and to help them gather the tools needed to be leaders on policy changes impacting women.

=== Women's History Essay Contest ===
Florida students in grades 6-9 participate in the Florida Women's Essay Contest designed to allow young people the opportunity to gain a more relevant appreciation of women's roles in history, and engage young minds of women's roles in history, and engage young minds of women's role in the future. Winning essayists are awarded prizes and recognized during Women's Day at the Capitol in Tallahassee.
