= Florida Memorial University =

Historically Black university in Miami Gardens, Florida

- A Promise, A Future
- Former names: Florida Baptist Institute (1879–1892); Florida Baptist Academy (1892–1896); Florida Normal and Industrial Institute (1896–1950); Florida Normal and Industrial Memorial College (1950–1963); Florida Memorial College (1963–2006)
- Motto: Leadership, Character, Service
- Type: Private historically black college
- Established: 1879; 147 years ago
- Religious affiliation: American Baptist Churches USA
- Endowment: $9.76 million
- President: William Cullen McCormick, Jr.
- Students: 1,800
- Location: Miami Gardens, Florida, U.S. 25.9182°N 80.2705°W
- Campus: Urban, 50 acres (20 ha)
- Colors: Blue & Orange
- Nickname: Lions
- Sporting affiliations: NAIA – The Sun
- Website: fmu.edu

Florida Memorial University is a private historically black college in Miami Gardens, Florida. Founded as the Florida Baptist Institute, today it claims a focus on broader Christianity and is a member of the United Negro College Fund.

== History ==
Florida Memorial University was founded in 1879 as the "Florida Baptist Institute" in Live Oak, Florida. It is one of the oldest academic centers in the state. Soon after, the American Baptist Home Mission Society gave the school its full support, and the first regular school year began in 1880.

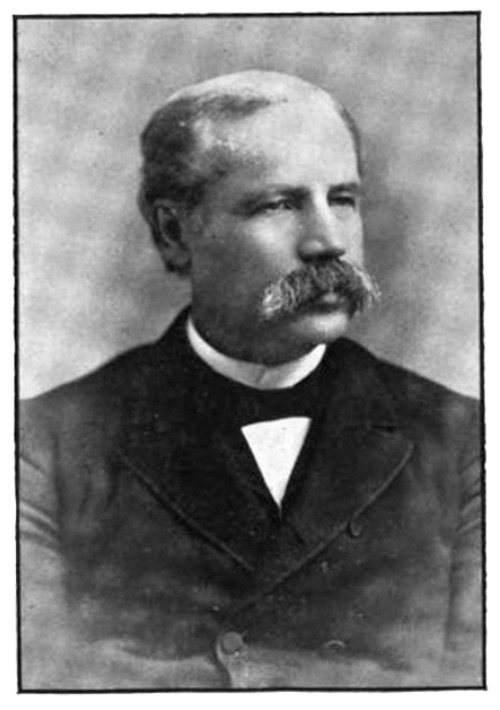
J. L. A. Fish, first president of the Florida Institute

J. L. A. Fish (1828–1890) was its first president. Despite a promising start, racial tensions soon cast a shadow over the institute. In April 1892, after unknown persons fired shots into one of the school's buildings, then-President Matthew Gilbert and other staff members fled Live Oak for Jacksonville, where they founded the "Florida Baptist Academy" in the basement of Bethel Baptist Church. They began holding classes in May 1892, with Sarah Ann Blocker as the main instructor. The school in Live Oak, however, continued to operate even after this splintering.

Nathan W. Collier, President of Florida Baptist Institute, and Sarah Ann Blocker, of Florida Baptist Academy, combined the two institutions to found "Florida Normal and Technical Institute" in 1896. Collier was president of the college from 1896 to 1941, and Blocker Dean of Women and vice-president from 1896 to 1944.

Brothers James Weldon Johnson and J. Rosamond Johnson (faculty member), wrote the words and music in 1900 to "Lift Ev'ry Voice and Sing" (known as the "Negro National Anthem").

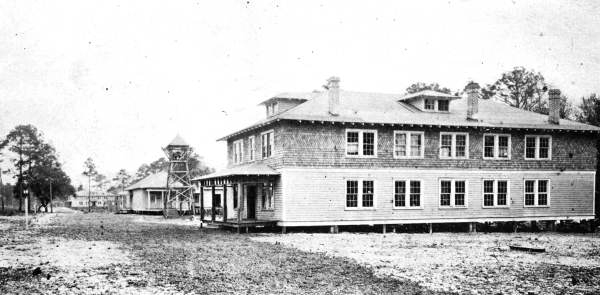
Florida Normal and Industrial Institute in St. Augustine, Florida, c. 1920

Florida Normal and Industrial Institute moved to St. Augustine in 1918 and operated in buildings on a 110-acre (0.45 km^{2}) tract of land, the site of the "Old Hanson Plantation". It had been based on the forced labor of enslaved African Americans.

In 1941, the Live Oak and St. Augustine institutions merged, changing their limited offerings from a junior college classification to a four-year liberal arts institution; it graduated its first four-year class in 1945. The young author Zora Neale Hurston taught at the school in 1942; she lived on the second floor of a two-story house at 791 West King Street, just east of the campus.

The school's name was changed in 1950 to "Florida Normal and Industrial Memorial College". In 1963, the charter was amended to change the name to "Florida Memorial College". Concerned by race-related violence in the city in relation to the civil rights movement (see St. Augustine movement), in 1965 the college bought a tract of land in what was then rural Dade County and developed the campus there.

In 1968, the college relocated to its present site (now "northwest Miami"). By 1972, it graduated its first class at the Miami site. Florida Memorial College celebrated its 100th anniversary in 1979 and began a series of expansion projects on the 44-acre (180,000 m^{2}) campus.

In 1993, Albert E. Smith was appointed as the college's tenth president. He also directed a period of growth. On July 3, 2006, Karl S. Wright became the eleventh president.

Roslyn Clark Artis was appointed interim president in 2013 and became the 13th president in 2014; she was the first female President in the institution's 138-year history. In 2017 she left to become the first female President of Benedict College in Columbia, South Carolina in its 147-year history.

For years the college was based in what was classified as the Opa-locka North census-designated place, in an unincorporated area. In 2003 this was incorporated as the city of Miami Gardens.

In 2006, Florida Memorial College changed its name to "Florida Memorial University", a reflection of its expansion in graduate offerings.

== Academics ==
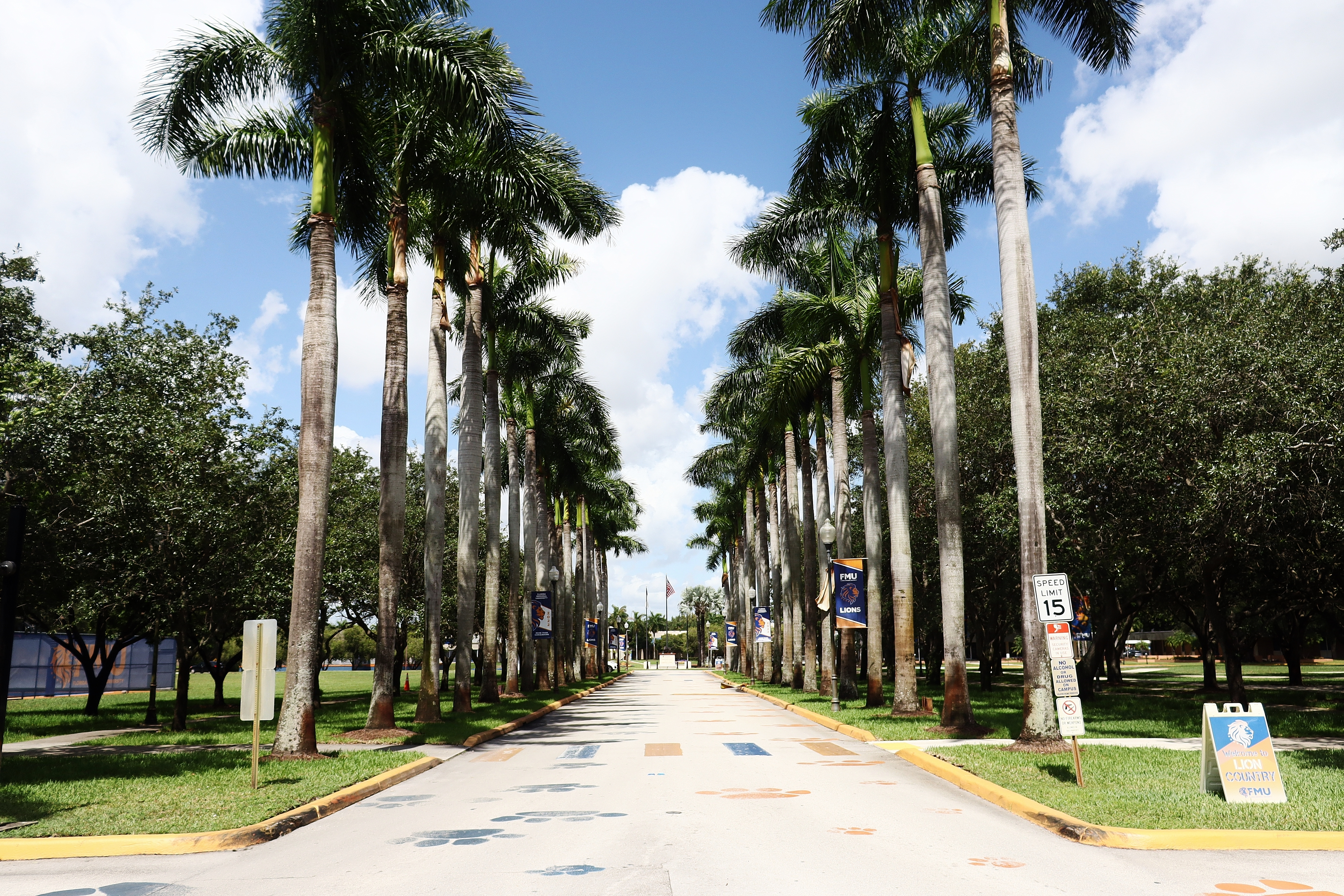
FMU campus

Florida Memorial University is accredited by the Southern Association of Colleges and Schools. It offers 41 undergraduate degree programs and four graduate degree programs through its eight academic divisions in six academic schools. The business programs are accredited by the Association of Collegiate Business Schools and Programs. The social work program is accredited by the Council on Social Work Education. The Music Department is accredited by the National Association of Schools of Music (NASM).

The institution has offered an honors program for 10 years that is designed to target and challenge students to their highest level.

The institution also offers pre-college programs to reach out to the surrounding community. It addresses critical urban needs and helps more than 700 youth through the Lion's Pre-College Experience Institute. The institute offers several programs that focus on academic achievement and higher learning, with an emphasis on physical fitness, dropout prevention, religion, financial management, entrepreneurship, and personal development.

=== Library ===
The Nathan W. Collier Library was named after Nathan White Collier, who served as the third president of Florida Baptist Academy for forty-five years. Collier was responsible for tireless fundraising and advocating; acquiring property and land; increasing enrollment and attracting nationally renowned faculty. Collier tried to replicate the educational aims and programs of Booker T. Washington. His greatest contribution was to the education and training of Black teachers throughout Florida.

The Collier library houses 120,000 volumes, two Information Commons areas as well as separate Electronic, Teaching, Periodicals, Audiovisual and Group study rooms. The library subscribes to 30 databases, 519 periodicals and contains two special collections: The Rev. I. C. Mickins Theological and Sermonic Research, and the Dr. Laban Connor Black Collection. The library also houses the Trayvon Martin Foundation, in honor of Trayvon Martin, established in March 2012 by Sybrina Fulton and Tracy Martin as "a nonprofit organization whose main purpose is to provide emotional and financial support to families who have lost a child to gun violence."

== Athletics ==
The Florida Memorial athletic teams are called the Lions. The institution is a member of the National Association of Intercollegiate Athletics (NAIA), primarily competing in the Sun Conference (formerly known as the Florida Sun Conference (FSC) until after the 2007–08 school year) since the 1990–91 academic year. Its football program began competing in the Mid-South Conference (MSC) from the 2020 to 2021 fall seasons.

Florida Memorial competes in 13 intercollegiate varsity sports: Men's sports include baseball, basketball, football, soccer and track & field; while women's sports include basketball, beach volleyball, flag football, soccer, softball, track & field and volleyball; and co-ed sports include cheerleading.

=== Football ===
The institution played football under the name "Florida Normal and Industrial Institute" from 1946-58 (except 1949), competing in the Southeastern Athletic Conference. The Lions' record in those twelve seasons was 41 wins, 25 losses and six ties, with a 14–8 win over Albany State in their final game of 1958. The football program was re-instated in 2020, after a 62 year hiatus. The "new" Lions got their first victory on October 23, 2021, defeating Union College. 41–17.

== Notable alumni ==
Name	Class year	Notability	Reference(s)
Barrington Irving, Jr.		In 2007 became the first and youngest Black pilot to fly solo around the world	
Harry T. Moore		Educator, civil rights activist, and leader of NAACP in Brevard County and state of Florida; assassinated on Christmas night 1951	
Freddie Lee Peterkin		Soul and Gospel singer aka Freddie Lee	
Grisha Heyliger-Marten		Politician from Saint Maarten	
William C. McCormick, Jr.		Entrepreneur, community advocate, first alumnus to serve as president of FMU	

== See also ==
- Collier-Blocker Junior College
