= Bobelle Sconiers Harrell =

American pilot (1923–2012)

Ina Bobelle "Bobbie" Wright Sconiers Harrell (1923-2012) was a pharmacist and pilot who was awarded the Congressional Gold Medal (as part of the Civil Air Patrol) on December 10, 2014.

Harrell was born in Fort Walton Beach, and was the first female student admitted to the School of Pharmacy at what is today Auburn University, and was then Alabama Polytechnic Institute. She graduated in 1944 at the top of her class with Phi Kappa Phi and Cardinal Key honors. She later became one of the first women licensed to practice pharmacy in Florida. She was also licensed to practice pharmacy in Alabama.

Bobelle had married at age 18, to 1st Lt. Ewart T. Sconiers, but he died while imprisoned as a POW during World War II in Stalag Luft III (of “The Great Escape” fame). Shortly before Bobelle died, she learned his remains had been found. She and her second husband, Philip B. Harrell, owned Harrell's Drug Store from 1956 through 1982.

According to her own journal, she made her first solo flight on April 5, 1945. That year she received a pilot's license and was trained to fly missions with the Civil Air Patrol. Bobelle moved to Crestview in 1946, where she worked at Brackin's Pharmacy and flew with the patrol between Pensacola and Birmingham off and on for two years.
