= Del Monte Fresh Produce Co. v. Dole Food Co. =

Florida court case

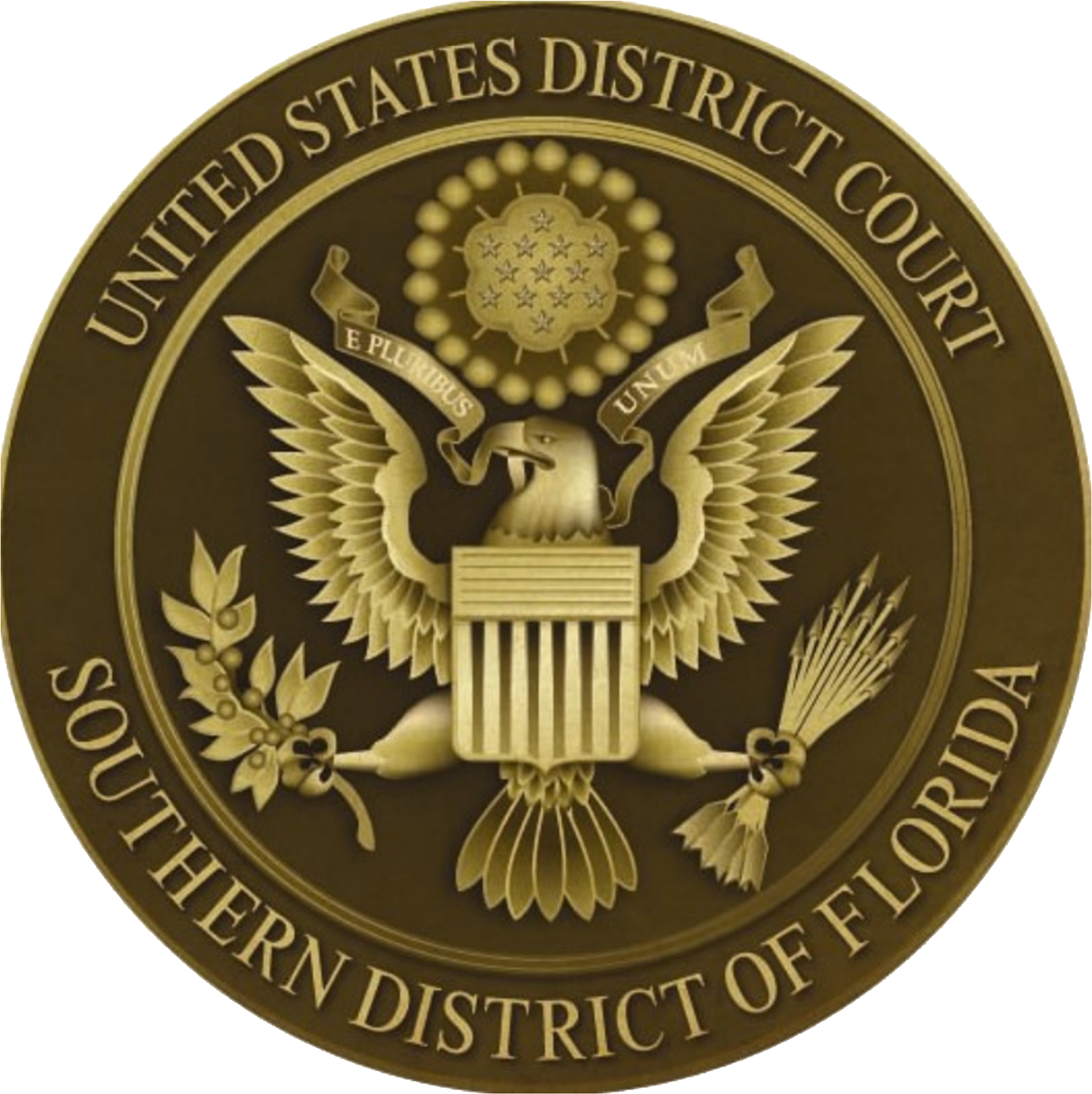
- Court: United States District Court for the Southern District of Florida
- Full case name: Del Monte Fresh Produce Company, and Del Monte Fresh Produce, N.A., Inc. v. Dole Food Company, Inc., and Dole Fresh Fruit Company
- Decided: February 22, 2001
- Docket nos.: 00-cv-1171
- Citation: 136 F. Supp. 2d 1271

Court membership
- Judge sitting: Alan Stephen Gold

Keywords
- trade secret

Del Monte Fresh Produce Co. v. Dole Food Co., 136 F. Supp. 2d 1271 (S.D. Fla. 2001), was a trade secret misappropriation case where Del Monte Fresh Produce Company asserted that Dole Food Company obtained their specialty pineapples through non-legal means and were unjustly enriched as a result.

== Facts ==
Through the expenditure of time, money, research, and other resources, Del Monte developed a special pineapple variety called MD-2 that was sweeter and contained more vitamin C, fiber, color, and a milder texture than competing pineapples. Del Monte marketed these pineapples under the name "Del Monte Gold Extra Sweet." Dole obtained the MD-2 pineapple through non-legal means via a farmer in Costa Rica who had been hired by Del Monte to grow the pineapple. Dole then began selling the same variety under the moniker "Dole Premium Select." The main question presented to the court was whether or not a pineapple could be a protectable trade secret.

== Holding ==
The court discussed Del Monte's failure to precisely define what about the pineapple was misappropriated. The court stated that one cannot necessarily protect a pineapple as a thing, but one can protect something about the pineapple whether it be genetic makeup, growing techniques, etc. Court ultimately held that a pineapple's genetic information could be a protectable trade secret, and that there was misappropriation.
