= Hantman =

Hantman is a surname. Notable people with the surname include:

- Alan Hantman (born 1942), American architect
- Murray Hantman (1904–1999), American painter, muralist, and teacher
- Perla Tabares Hantman (born 1936), Cuban-American school board member
