= C. Clyde Atkins =

American judge

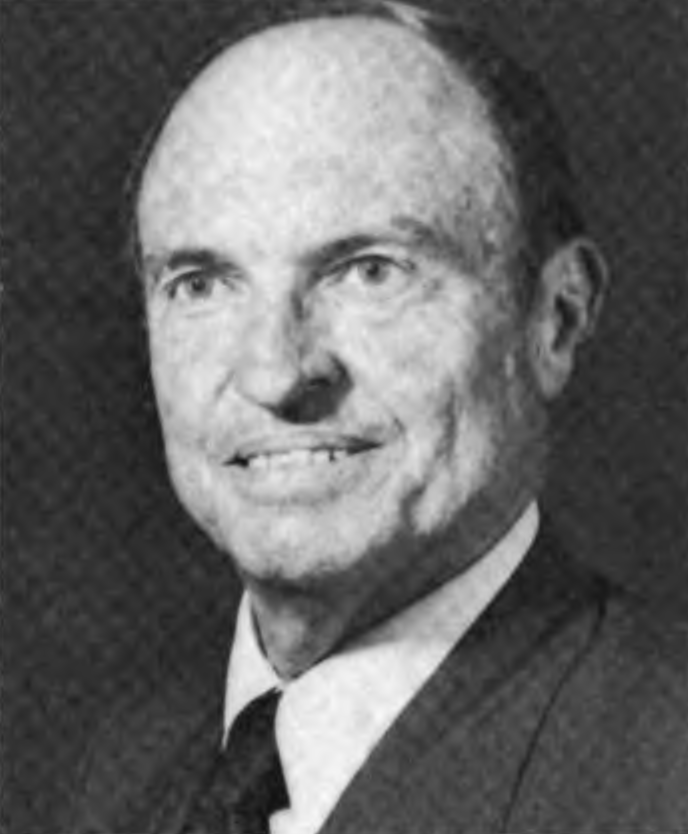

Senior Judge of the United States District Court for the Southern District of Florida
- In office December 31, 1982 – March 11, 1999

Chief Judge of the United States District Court for the Southern District of Florida
- In office 1977–1982
- Preceded by: Charles B. Fulton
- Succeeded by: Joe Oscar Eaton

Judge of the United States District Court for the Southern District of Florida
- In office July 22, 1966 – December 31, 1982
- Appointed by: Lyndon B. Johnson
- Preceded by: Seat established by 80 Stat. 75
- Succeeded by: Lenore Carrero Nesbitt

Personal details
- Born: Carl Clyde Atkins; November 23, 1914 Washington, D.C., U.S.
- Died: March 11, 1999 (aged 84) Miami, Florida, U.S.
- Spouse: Esther Castillo
- Education: Fredric G. Levin College of Law (LLB)

Carl Clyde Atkins (November 23, 1914 – March 11, 1999) was a United States district judge of the United States District Court for the Southern District of Florida.

== Education and career ==
Born November 23, 1914, in Washington, D.C., Atkins received a Bachelor of Laws in 1936 from the Fredric G. Levin College of Law at the University of Florida. He entered private practice in Stuart, Florida from 1936 to 1941. He practiced law in Miami, Florida from 1941 to 1966.

== Federal judicial service ==
Atkins was nominated by President Lyndon B. Johnson on June 28, 1966, to the United States District Court for the Southern District of Florida, to a new seat authorized by 80 Stat. 75. He was confirmed by the United States Senate on July 22, 1966, and received his commission on July 22, 1966. He served as Chief Judge from 1977 to 1982. He assumed senior status on December 31, 1982. His service terminated on March 11, 1999, due to his death in Miami.

=== Notable cases ===
In 1969, Atkins worked on ensuring the desegregation of Miami schools by appointing a special panel to ensure the plan was carried out. In 1970, he ruled on a famous case involving the poet Allen Ginsberg after someone shut off Ginsberg's microphone during a public reading. Atkins ruled that Ginsberg should be given another reading, free of charge.

Among the many important cases in a long and distinguished career, Atkins issued landmark rulings protecting the constitutional rights of homeless people in Pottinger v. City of Miami, as well as major rulings in other cases involving the rights of Haitian and Cuban refugees.

Legal offices
Preceded by Seat established by 80 Stat. 75	Judge of the United States District Court for the Southern District of Florida; 1966–1982	Succeeded by Lenore Carrero Nesbitt
Preceded by Charles B. Fulton	Chief Judge of the United States District Court for the Southern District of Florida; 1977–1982	Succeeded by Joe Oscar Eaton
