= Alan Stephen Gold =

American judge (born 1944)

Senior Judge of the United States District Court for the Southern District of Florida
- Incumbent
- Assumed office January 10, 2011

Judge of the United States District Court for the Southern District of Florida
- In office July 1, 1997 – January 10, 2011
- Appointed by: Bill Clinton
- Preceded by: Jose Alejandro Gonzalez Jr.
- Succeeded by: Robin S. Rosenbaum

Personal details
- Born: Alan Stephen Gold; January 8, 1944 (age 82) The Bronx, New York, U.S.
- Education: University of Florida (BA); Duke University (JD); University of Miami (LLM)

Alan Stephen Gold (born January 8, 1944) is an inactive senior United States district judge of the United States District Court for the Southern District of Florida.

== Early life and education ==
Gold was born in 1944 in New York City. He attended Miami Beach High School. Gold received a Bachelor of Arts degree from the University of Florida in 1966, a Juris Doctor from Duke University School of Law in 1969, and a Master of Laws from the University of Miami School of Law in 1974.

== Career ==
Gold served as a research assistant to Judge Charles Carroll of the Florida Third District Court of Appeal from 1969 to 1970. He was briefly in private practice in Miami in 1970, before serving as assistant county attorney in the Dade County Attorney's Office from 1971 to 1975.

=== Federal judicial service ===
President Bill Clinton nominated Gold to the United States District Court for the Southern District of Florida on February 12, 1997, to the seat vacated by Judge Jose Alejandro Gonzalez Jr. During Gold's confirmation hearings before the Senate, he surprised many when, after being asked which Supreme Court decision troubled him most, he named Griswold v. Connecticut. He was confirmed by the Senate on June 27, 1997 and received his commission on July 1, 1997. He assumed senior status on January 10, 2011.

=== Notable rulings ===
During his service on the district court Gold has heard cases including the trial of Alberto Gutman, the corruption and conspiracy trial of 11 former Miami Police Department officers and a racketeering and fraud lawsuit against DuPont. Gold also issued an injunction in favor of the American Civil Liberties Union of Florida against the Miami-Dade County Public Schools in a lawsuit challenging the school board decision to remove the book Vamos a Cuba from school libraries after the book had been challenged by Cuban exiles. Gold also presided over a case involving ten Coral Gables/University of Miami Police officers who were suing the University of Miami for employment related matters along with claims of misreporting crime statistics and police corruption . He dismissed that case on summary judgment in favor of the University, yet failed to disclose to the officers or their counsel (as required by federal statute and judicial rules and canons) the facts that 1) he listed the University as a source of non-investment income on his Federal Financial Disclosure forms for the years he presided over the case; 2) he failed to disclose that his wife was a high level employee of the University during those same years he presided over the case; and 3) his law clerk, was also a paid legal writing instructor at the University's School of Law, again, during the time he presided over the case; and 4)he was a former employee of the University. The officers once this was discovered, but after Gold had already dismissed their case, filed a motion for recusal against Gold and a motion to reopen the case and attached copies of all of the documents supporting their motion. The chief judge ruled that Gold did nothing wrong by not disclosing those details.

== See also ==
- List of Jewish American jurists

== Sources ==
Legal offices
Preceded by Jose Alejandro Gonzalez Jr.	Judge of the United States District Court for the Southern District of Florida; 1997–2011	Succeeded by Robin S. Rosenbaum
