= Rodney Smith (judge) =

American judge (born 1974)

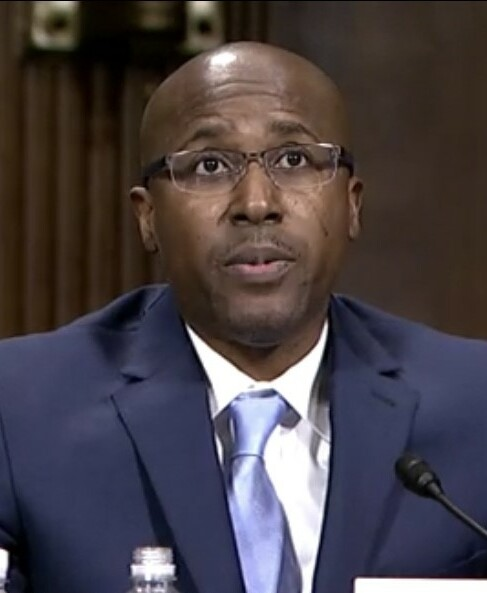
- Smith in 2018

Judge of the United States District Court for the Southern District of Florida
- Incumbent
- Assumed office June 14, 2019
- Appointed by: Donald Trump
- Preceded by: Robin S. Rosenbaum

Judge of the Eleventh Judicial Circuit Court of Florida
- In office July 2012 – June 13, 2019
- Appointed by: Rick Scott
- Preceded by: Scott J. Silverman
- Succeeded by: William Altfield

Judge of the Miami-Dade County Court
- In office May 2008 – July 2012
- Appointed by: Charlie Crist

Personal details
- Born: 1974 (age 51–52) Orlando, Florida, U.S.
- Education: Florida A&M University (BS); Michigan State University (JD)

Rodney Smith (born 1974) is a United States district judge of the United States District Court for the Southern District of Florida.

== Biography ==
Smith received a Bachelor of Science from Florida A&M University in 1996, cum laude. He earned his Juris Doctor in 1999 from Michigan State University, also cum laude.

Smith served as an Assistant State Attorney for the Miami-Dade County State Attorney's office from 1999 to 2003. He then was in private practice from 2003 to 2007. From 2007 to 2008, he served as a Senior Assistant City Attorney for the city of Miami Beach. Governor Charlie Crist appointed him in 2008 to preside as a judge of the Miami-Dade County Court, where he served until 2012. Governor Rick Scott appointed him to the Eleventh Judicial Circuit Court in 2012, where he served until his elevation to the federal bench in 2019.

== Federal judicial service ==
Smith was mentioned as a potential judicial nominee in February 2018. On April 26, 2018, President Donald Trump announced his intent to nominate Smith to serve as a United States District Judge of the United States District Court for the Southern District of Florida. On May 7, 2018, his nomination was sent to the Senate. He was nominated to the seat vacated by Judge Robin S. Rosenbaum, who was elevated to the United States Court of Appeals for the Eleventh Circuit on June 2, 2014. On October 17, 2018, a hearing on his nomination was held before the Senate Judiciary Committee.

On January 3, 2019, his nomination was returned to the President under Rule XXXI, Paragraph 6 of the United States Senate. On January 23, 2019, President Trump announced his intent to renominate Smith for a federal judgeship. His nomination was sent to the Senate later that day. On February 7, 2019, his nomination was reported out of committee by a 17–5 vote. On June 11, 2019, the Senate invoked cloture on his nomination by a 77–19 vote. On June 12, 2019, his nomination was confirmed by a 78–18 vote. He received his judicial commission on June 14, 2019.

== See also ==
- List of African-American federal judges
- List of African-American jurists

Legal offices
Preceded by Scott J. Silverman	Judge of the Eleventh Judicial Circuit Court of Florida; 2012–2019	Succeeded by William Altfield
Preceded by Robin S. Rosenbaum	Judge of the United States District Court for the Southern District of Florida; 2019–present	Incumbent
