= Robin S. Rosenbaum =

American judge (born 1966)

Robin Rosenbaum
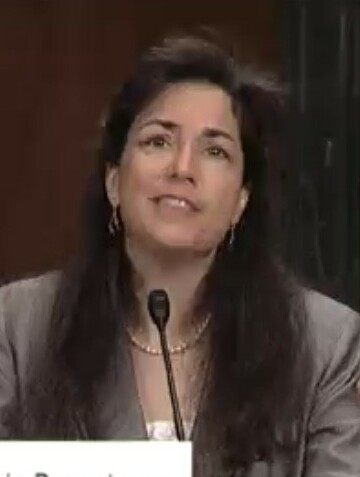
- Rosenbaum in 2014

Judge of the United States Court of Appeals for the Eleventh Circuit
- Incumbent
- Assumed office June 2, 2014
- Appointed by: Barack Obama
- Preceded by: Rosemary Barkett

Judge of the United States District Court for the Southern District of Florida
- In office June 27, 2012 – June 3, 2014
- Appointed by: Barack Obama
- Preceded by: Alan Stephen Gold
- Succeeded by: Rodney Smith

Personal details
- Born: 1966 (age 59–60) Chapel Hill, North Carolina, U.S.
- Party: Democratic
- Education: Cornell University (BA); University of Miami (JD)

Robin Stacie Rosenbaum (born 1966) is an American lawyer who has served as a United States circuit judge of the United States Court of Appeals for the Eleventh Circuit since 2014. She previously was a United States district judge of the United States District Court for the Southern District of Florida from 2012 to 2014.

== Early life and education ==
Rosenbaum was born in Chapel Hill, North Carolina, and attended Pine Crest School in Florida. She completed her Bachelor of Arts degree in 1988 at Cornell University, where she was a student-elected member of the Board of Trustees, a member of the Quill and Dagger society, and a member of the Zeta Phi chapter of Alpha Chi Omega. Rosenbaum received her Juris Doctor magna cum laude, in 1991 from the University of Miami School of Law.

== Career ==
Rosenbaum was a trial attorney in the Federal Programs Branch of the United States Department of Justice from 1991 to 1995. She served as staff counsel for the United States Office of the Independent Counsel from 1995 to 1996. She worked as a litigation associate at Holland & Knight from 1996 to 1997, where she focused on employment law. Rosenbaum then clerked for Judge Stanley Marcus of the United States Court of Appeals for the Eleventh Circuit in 1998. From 1998 to 2007, she served as an Assistant United States Attorney in the Southern District of Florida, becoming Chief of the Economic Crime Section in Fort Lauderdale in 2002 and focused extensively on elder financial abuse and fraud. Since 2009, she has been an adjunct professor at the University of Miami School of Law.

== Federal judicial service ==
In 2007, Rosenbaum was selected to be a United States magistrate judge of the U.S. District Court for the Southern District of Florida. Her service as a magistrate judge ended on June 27, 2012 when she was elevated to district court judge.

On November 30, 2011, President Barack Obama nominated Rosenbaum to be District Judge for the Southern District of Florida, to replace Alan Stephen Gold, who assumed senior status on January 10, 2011. The United States Senate confirmed Rosenbaum by a 92–3 vote on June 26, 2012. She received her commission on June 27, 2012. Her service as a district court judge was terminated on June 3, 2014 when she was elevated to the court of appeals.

On November 7, 2013, President Barack Obama nominated Rosenbaum to the United States Court of Appeals for the Eleventh Circuit. She received a hearing before the Senate Judiciary Committee on February 11, 2014. Her nomination was reported out of committee on March 6, 2014 by a voice vote. Cloture was filed on her nomination on May 6, 2014. On May 8, 2014, the United States Senate invoked cloture on Rosenbaum’s nomination by a 57–37 vote. On May 12, 2014, her nomination was confirmed by a 91–0 vote. She received her commission on June 2, 2014.

== See also ==
- List of Jewish American jurists

Legal offices
Preceded by Alan Stephen Gold	Judge of the United States District Court for the Southern District of Florida; 2012–2014	Succeeded by Rodney Smith
Preceded by Rosemary Barkett	Judge of the United States Court of Appeals for the Eleventh Circuit; 2014–present	Incumbent
