= Charles B. Fulton =

American judge

Senior Judge of the United States District Court for the Southern District of Florida
- In office June 30, 1978 – May 15, 1996

Chief Judge of the United States District Court for the Southern District of Florida
- In office 1966–1977
- Preceded by: David W. Dyer
- Succeeded by: C. Clyde Atkins

Judge of the United States District Court for the Southern District of Florida
- In office April 26, 1963 – June 30, 1978
- Appointed by: John F. Kennedy
- Preceded by: Seat established by 75 Stat. 80
- Succeeded by: Jose Alejandro Gonzalez Jr.

Personal details
- Born: Charles Britton Fulton; May 12, 1910 Fallon, Nevada
- Died: May 15, 1996 (aged 86) West Palm Beach, Florida
- Education: Fredric G. Levin College of Law (LL.B.)

Charles Britton Fulton (May 12, 1910 – May 15, 1996) was a United States district judge of the United States District Court for the Southern District of Florida.

== Education and career ==
Born in Fallon, Nevada Fulton received a Bachelor of Laws from the Fredric G. Levin College of Law at the University of Florida in 1935. He was in private practice of law in West Palm Beach, Florida from 1935 to 1963. He was an assistant state attorney general of Florida in 1942. He was in the United States Naval Reserve from 1942 to 1946. He was General Counsel of the Board of Commissioners of the Port of Palm Beach District from 1950 to 1963. He was president, Chairman of the Board and General Counsel for Home Federal Savings and Loan Association of Palm Beach, Florida from 1958 to 1963.

== Federal judicial service ==
Fulton was nominated by President John F. Kennedy on April 4, 1963, to the United States District Court for the Southern District of Florida, to a new seat created by 75 Stat. 80. He was confirmed by the United States Senate on April 24, 1963, and received his commission on April 26, 1963. He served as Chief Judge from 1966 to 1977. He assumed senior status on June 30, 1978. His service was terminated on May 15, 1996, due to his death in West Palm Beach.

== Sources ==
Legal offices
Preceded by Seat established by 75 Stat. 80	Judge of the United States District Court for the Southern District of Florida; 1963–1978	Succeeded by Jose Alejandro Gonzalez Jr.
Preceded by David W. Dyer	Chief Judge of the United States District Court for the Southern District of Florida; 1966–1977	Succeeded by C. Clyde Atkins
