= Jose Alejandro Gonzalez Jr. =

American judge (born 1931)

Senior Judge of the United States District Court for the Southern District of Florida
- Incumbent
- Assumed office November 30, 1996

Judge of the United States District Court for the Southern District of Florida
- In office July 28, 1978 – November 30, 1996
- Appointed by: Jimmy Carter
- Preceded by: Charles B. Fulton
- Succeeded by: Alan Stephen Gold

Personal details
- Born: November 26, 1931 (age 94) Tampa, Florida
- Education: University of Florida (BA, JD)

Jose Alejandro Gonzalez Jr. (born November 26, 1931) is a senior United States district judge of the United States District Court for the Southern District of Florida.

== Education and career ==
Born in 1931, in Tampa, Florida, Gonzalez received a Bachelor of Arts degree in 1952 from the University of Florida and a Juris Doctor in 1957 from the Fredric G. Levin College of Law at the University of Florida. He in the United States Army as a lieutenant from 1952 to 1954 and in the United States Army Reserve as a captain from 1954 to 1960. He was a claims representative for the State Farm Mutual Life Insurance Company in Lakeland, Florida, from 1957 to 1958. He was in private practice in Fort Lauderdale, Florida from 1958 to 1964. He was an assistant state attorney of the Fifteenth Judicial Circuit Court of Florida in Palm Beach County from 1961 to 1964. He was a Judge of the Seventeenth Judicial Circuit Court of Florida in Broward County from 1964 to 1978.

== Federal judicial service ==
Gonzalez was nominated by President Jimmy Carter on July 6, 1978, to a seat on the United States District Court for the Southern District of Florida vacated by Judge Charles B. Fulton. He was confirmed by the United States Senate on July 26, 1978, and received his commission on July 28, 1978. He assumed senior status on November 30, 1996. As of December 2025, Gonzalez, who sat in Ft. Lauderdale, is listed as "retired" on the court's website, though Gonzalez appears to have been inactive as early as August 2017.

== See also ==
- List of first minority male lawyers and judges in Florida
- List of Hispanic and Latino American jurists
- List of United States federal judges by longevity of service

Legal offices
Preceded by Charles B. Fulton	Judge of the United States District Court for the Southern District of Florida; 1978–1996	Succeeded by Alan Stephen Gold
