= Lenore Carrero Nesbitt =

American judge

Senior Judge of the United States District Court for the Southern District of Florida
- In office July 19, 1998 – October 6, 2001

Judge of the United States District Court for the Southern District of Florida
- In office November 16, 1983 – July 19, 1998
- Appointed by: Ronald Reagan
- Preceded by: C. Clyde Atkins
- Succeeded by: Adalberto Jordan

Personal details
- Born: July 19, 1932 Miami, Florida, U.S.
- Died: October 6, 2001 (aged 69) Coral Gables, Florida, U.S.
- Education: Stephens College (AA); Northwestern University (BS); University of Miami (LLB)

Lenore Carrero Nesbitt (July 19, 1932 – October 6, 2001) was a United States district judge of the United States District Court for the Southern District of Florida.

== Education and career ==
Nesbitt was born in Miami, Florida. She received an Associate of Arts degree from Stephens College in 1952. She received a Bachelor of Science degree from Northwestern University in 1954. She received a Bachelor of Laws from the University of Miami School of Law in 1957. She was a research assistant for the Florida First District Court of Appeal in Tallahassee from 1957 to 1959. She was in private practice of law in Miami from 1960 to 1963. She was a special assistant state attorney general of the State of Florida from 1961 to 1963. She was a research assistant for the Eleventh Judicial Circuit of Florida in Dade County from 1963 to 1965. She returned to private practice in Miami from 1969 to 1975. She was counsel for the Florida State Board of Medical Examiners from 1970 to 1971.

== State Circuit Court ==
Nesbitt was a judge of the Circuit Court of Florida, Eleventh Judicial Circuit from 1975 to 1982. In Miami, she heard pre-trial motions in the cases of eight Miami Officers accused of the murder of Arthur McDuffie and of its coverup. There, she dismissed the case against William Hanlon. and she moved the case to Tampa where the final three officers were found not guilty by jurors.

== Federal judicial service ==
Nesbitt was nominated by President Ronald Reagan on October 31, 1983, to a seat on the United States District Court for the Southern District of Florida vacated by Judge C. Clyde Atkins. She was confirmed by the United States Senate on November 15, 1983, and received commission on November 16, 1983. She assumed senior status on July 19, 1998. Her service was terminated on October 6, 2001, due to her death from complications of brain cancer in Coral Gables, Florida.

== Other service and honors ==
Nesbitt served on the University of Miami board of trustees. She was inducted into the Florida Women's Hall of Fame in 2001. The Lenore Carrero Nesbitt Public Service Scholarship was established at the University of Miami School of Law in her honor.

== Personal ==
Her husband Joseph Nesbitt was a judge on the Florida Third District Court of Appeal.

== See also ==
- List of Hispanic and Latino American jurists
- List of first women lawyers and judges in Florida

== Sources ==
Legal offices
Preceded by C. Clyde Atkins	Judge of the United States District Court for the Southern District of Florida; 1983–1998	Succeeded by Adalberto Jordan
