= Perla Tabares Hantman =

American school administrator

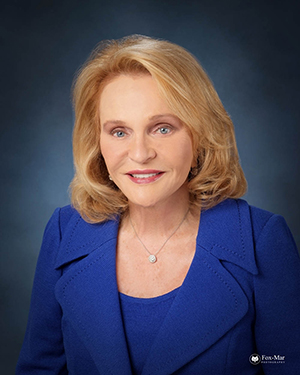
- Tabares Hantman c. 2021

Member of the Miami-Dade County Public Schools Board from the 4th district
- In office 1996 – November 22, 2022

Personal details
- Born: 1936 or 1937 Havana, Cuba
- Died: March 4, 2025 (aged 88) Miami, Florida, U.S.
- Resting place: Vista Memorial Gardens, Miami Lakes
- Education: University of Havana; Barry University

Perla Tabares Hantman (1936 or 1937 – March 4, 2025) was the Chair of District 4 on the School Board of Miami-Dade County.

== Early life and career ==
Hantman was born to Carlos and Gilda Tabares in Havana, Cuba, where she was also raised. She attended the University of Havana. A polyglot, she learned English, German, French, and Italian, in addition to her native Spanish. After Fidel Castro came into power in the island country, she emigrated from Cuba to the United States with her family. After spending a few years in Miami, Florida, she later lived in Mexico where she worked for the United States Embassy. After returning to the United States, she finished her education at Barry University.

Her career in public service began after meeting former U.S. Senator Bob Graham, who she lived across from a golf course in Miami Lakes. Graham aided her appointment to the Florida Board of Medicine, and the Florida Board of Governors, then known as the Florida Board of Regents; the latter committee overseeing the public State University System of Florida.

== Miami-Dade County school board (1996–2022) ==
Hantman was first elected to the Miami-Dade County Public School (MDCPS) board in November 1996, being re-elected to the board in 1998, 2002, 2006, 2010, 2014, and 2018, for a total of seven terms. Her 2010 re-election campaign was met with minor controversy as Ralph Arza was noted being at her headquarters. Arza had previously resigned from the Florida House, in 2006, for sending out expletive-filled threats to another state representative. Hantman stated Arza had "nothing to do" with her campaign. Her 2014 re-election campaign drew a challenger, Duysevi "Sevi" Miyar. The Miami Herald recommended its readers to vote for Tabares Hantman for the Miami-Dade School Board. Hantman won the race against Miyar.

She also served as the board's chair, first elected to position in 1999, becoming the first Hispanic woman to serve in the role. She was re-elected several times, serving a total of 14 terms in the position. She represented the board's 4th district, which included Miami Lakes and much of Hialeah and Hialeah Gardens. A proponent of bilingual education, she was known for running "strict and efficient" meetings as Chair.

Beginning in the early 2000s, Hantman sponsored an annual performance celebrating the Independence of Cuba on May 20, held by M.A. Milam K–8 Center. She was also noted for her influence and support in the development of the Cambridge program at Miami Lakes Educational Center, as well as the magnet reforms at Barbara Goleman Senior High and José Martí MAST, and later the opening of the South Florida Autism Charter School in 2021.

In a 6–3 vote in 2006, the board voted to remove Vamos a Cuba and its English-language version from 33 schools in the county. The board stated the children's book about Cuba was "inappropriate for young readers because of inaccuracies and omissions about life in the communist nation". A Cuban American conservative, Hantman supported the ban, stating it "misleads, confounds or confuses has no part in the education of our students, most especially elementary students, who are most impressionable and vulnerable". The book, part of a series, received a complaint from a parent who stated he was a political prisoner in Cuba, though 24 other books in the series were also removed without receiving a formal complaint. The American Civil Liberties Union (ACLU) of Florida sought to prevent the ban from going into effect, arguing the "books were removed without due process, violating students' Fourteenth Amendment rights", and filed a suit in the U.S. District Court. In 2009, Supreme Court justices rejected the ACLU of Florida's appeal seeking to prevent the ban.

In 2022, Hantman announced she would not be running for re-election, opting to retire after serving for 26 years on the school board. At the time, she was the board's longest serving member. The Vice Chair Steve Gallon, citing in part newly implemented 12-year term limits on board members, stated "We will not see another Perla Tabares Hantman. We will not see another iconic legacy of service and leadership in our lifetime". Later in the year, she notably changed her vote from "no" to "yes", regarding the approval of the sexual education textbook Comprehensive Health Skills. Her change caused the board to vote 5–4 in favor of updating sex ed curriculum for the MDCPS district. Also in 2022, Hantman voiced concerns with the "title and job description" of the school board's deputy chief of staff role, then newly proposed by José Dotres, the school district's superintendent.

== Death ==
Hantman died on March 4, 2025, survived by her sister, four children, eight grandchildren, and six great-grandchildren. She received a private funeral service and was buried next to her husband at Vista Memorial Gardens in Miami Lakes.

== See also ==
- List of Cuban Americans
