= Pineapple cutter =

Kitchen tool

A pineapple cutter is a hand-held cylindrical kitchen utensil with a circular blade at the end designed for cutting pineapples. A knife is required to remove the top of the pineapple before using the pineapple cutter. The cutter will cut the flesh of the pineapple into a spiral and also removes the core. Different sizes are available so as not to cut into the skin of the pineapple or cause too much to be wasted.

Pineapple cutter

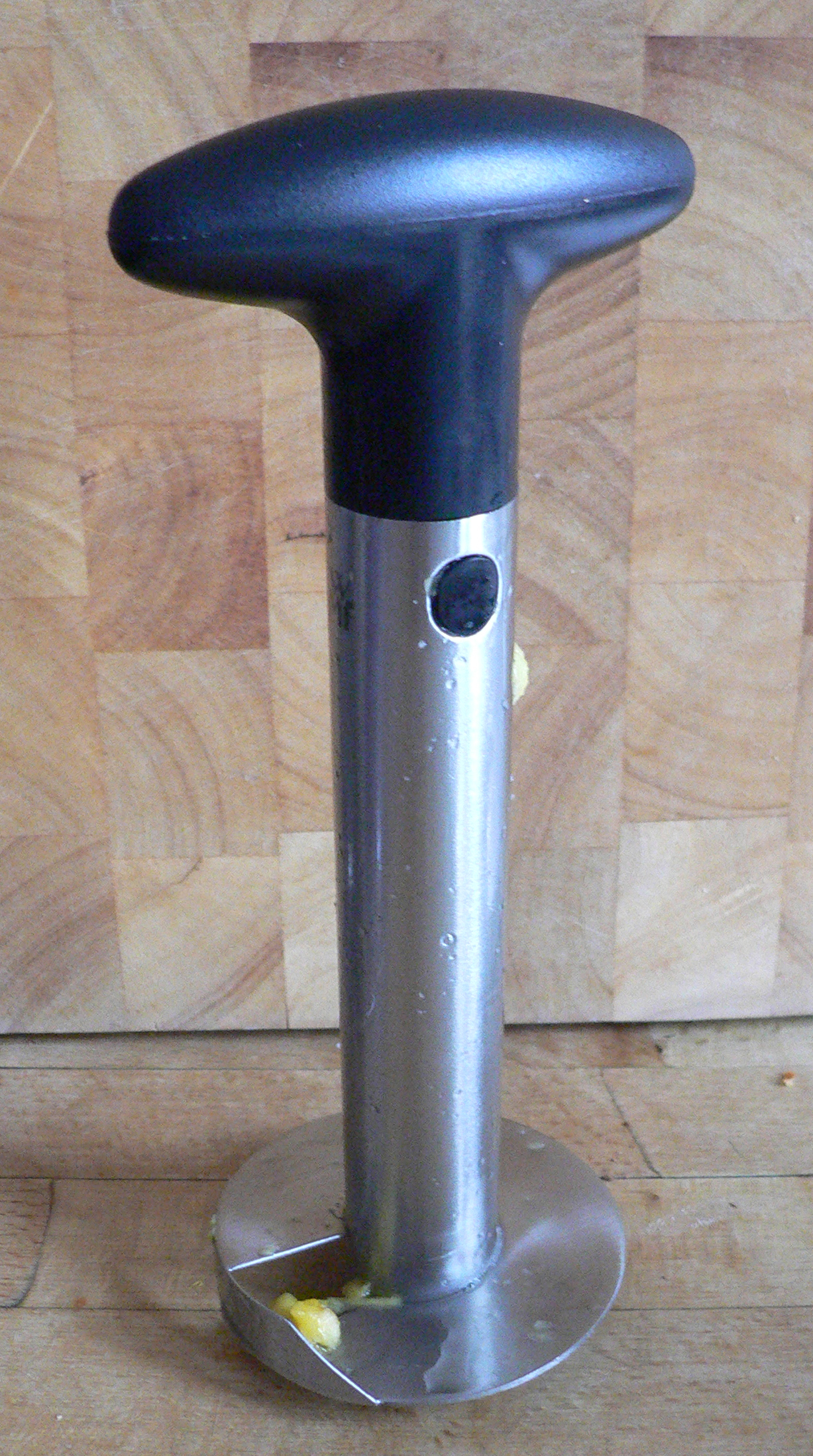

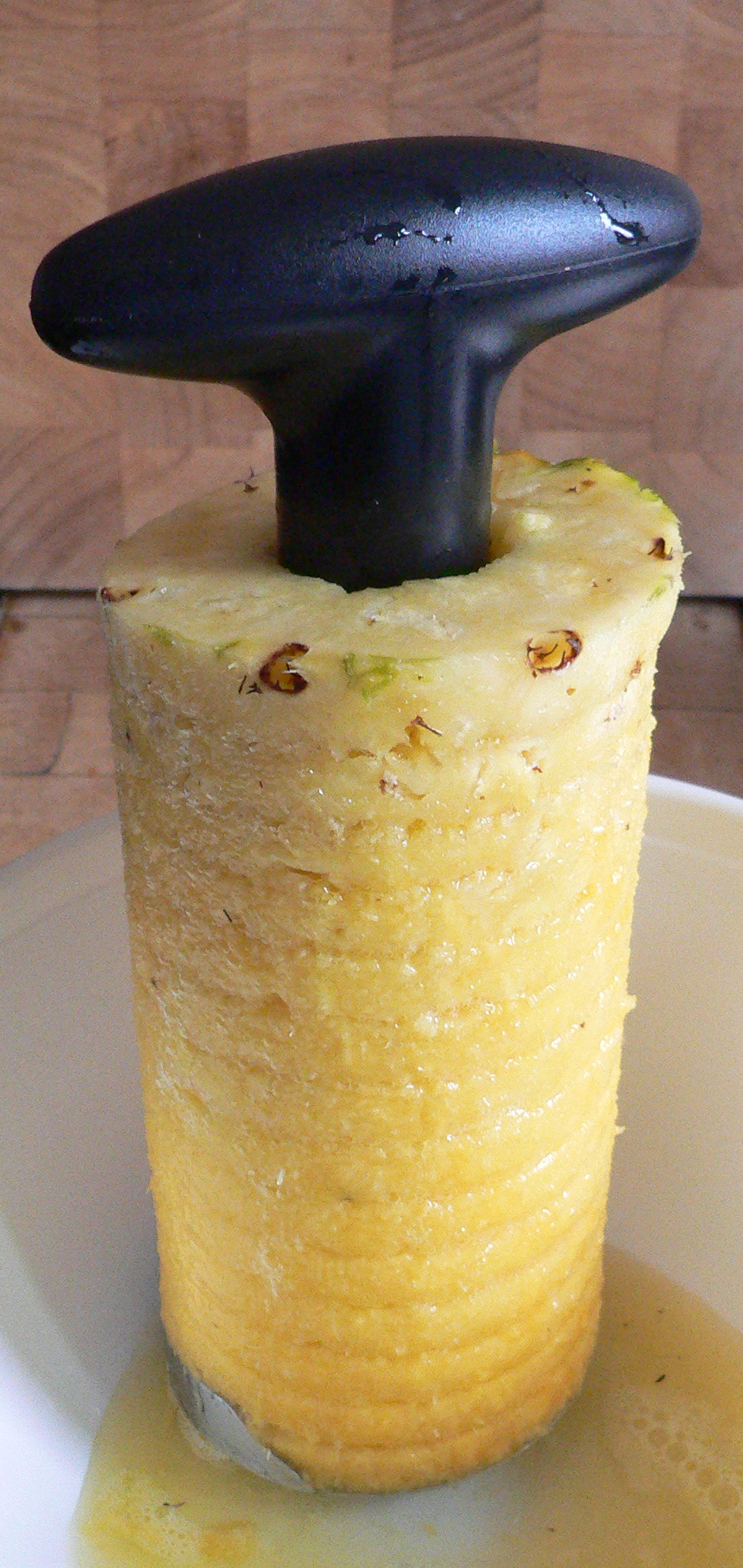

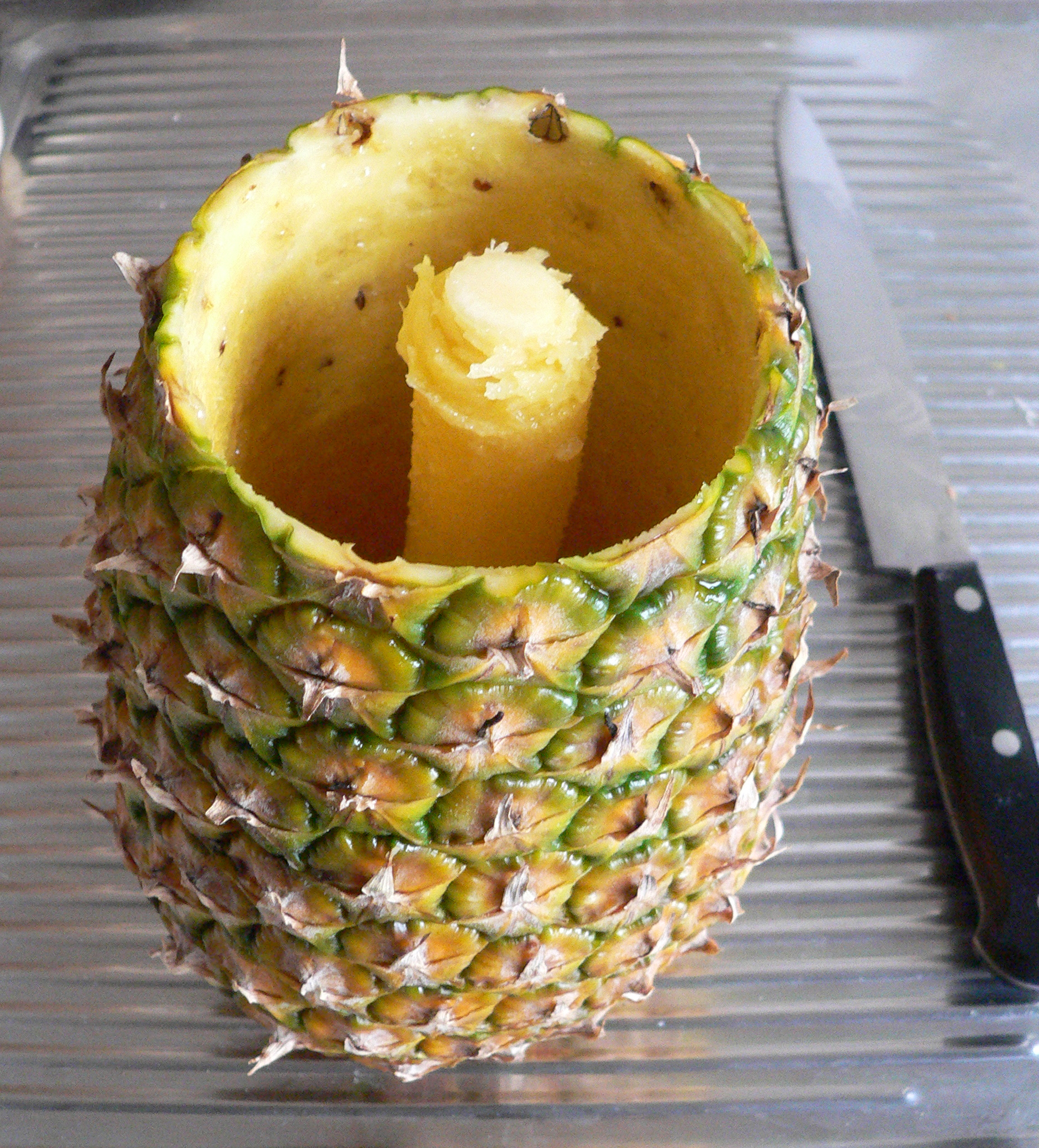

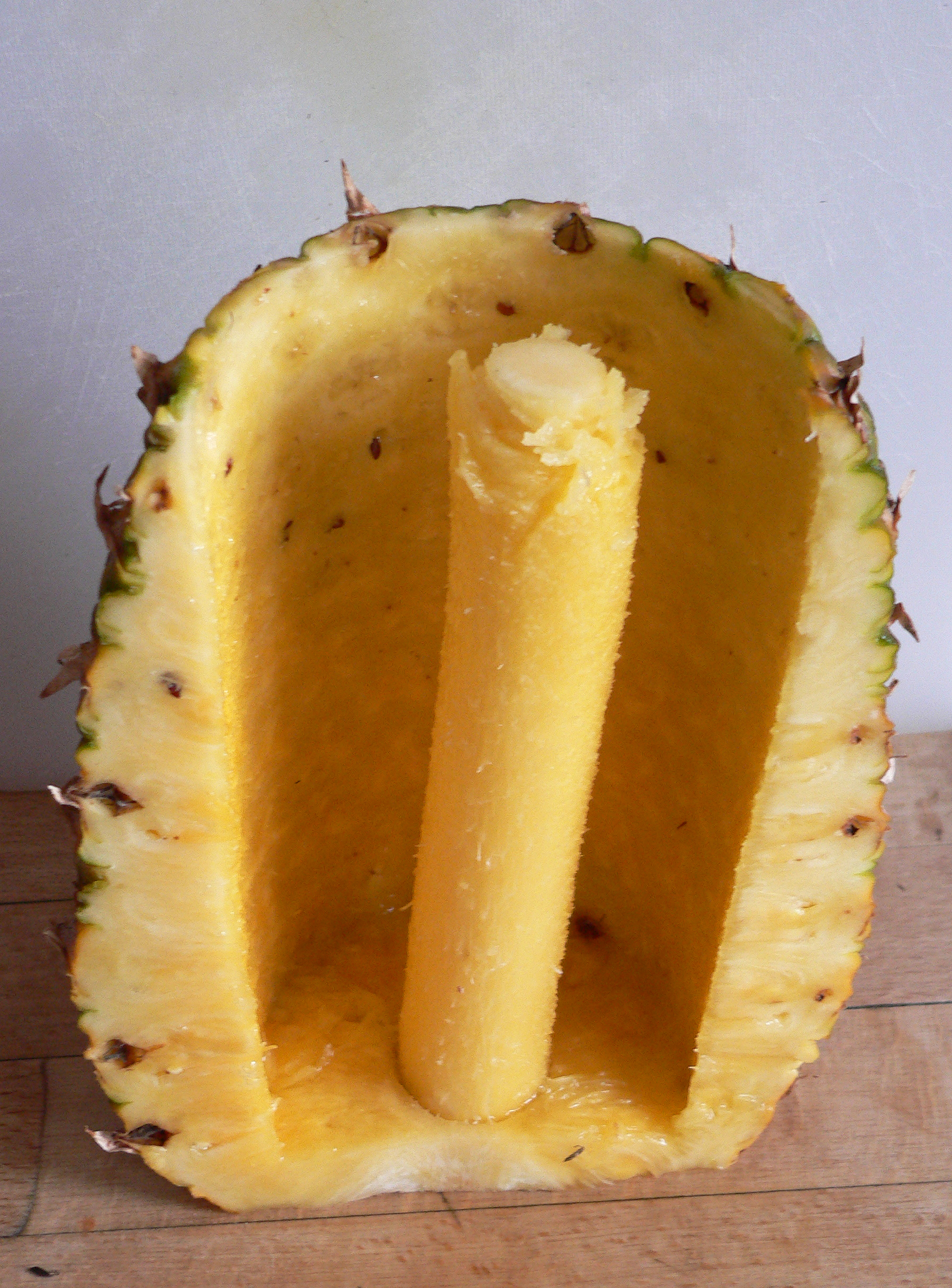

== See also ==
- Apple corer
