= Vamos a Cuba =

Children's book about Cuba

- Author: Alta Schreier
- Language: Spanish
- Subject: Geography
- Published: 2001 (Heinemann)
- Pages: 32
- ISBN: 1-57572-384-0
- OCLC: 43757474

Vamos a Cuba (Spanish, 'Let's Go to Cuba') is a children's book by Alta Schreier about Cuba.

Critics say that the book does not accurately represent life in the communist state. When Miami-Dade County Public Schools attempted to remove this book from the public school's library system the ACLU filed a lawsuit saying that it was a violation of the First Amendment.

A federal appeals court ruled that the Miami-Dade School Board did not violate the Constitution in 2006 when it removed a controversial children's book about Cuba from the public schools' library system.

In a 2–1 decision, the 11th Circuit Court of Appeals in Atlanta said the board did not breach the First Amendment, and ordered a Miami federal judge to lift a preliminary injunction that had allowed Vamos a Cuba to be checked out from school libraries.

The US Supreme Court declined to hear the legal challenge, so the book removal stands.
