= List of Duke University School of Law alumni =

Duke University School of Law is a private law school in Durham, North Carolina. Following are some of its notable alumni.

== Academia ==
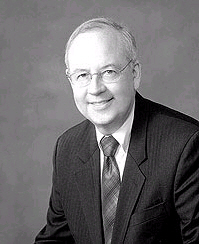
Kenneth Starr

- Garrett Epps, 1991 – professor at the University of Baltimore School of Law
- Pamela Gann, 1973 – president of Claremont McKenna College
- Robert W. Hillman – distinguished professor of law at University of California, Davis
- Ben F. Johnson, 1949 – dean of the Emory University School of Law and Georgia State University College of Law
- Ivan C. Rutledge – dean of the Ohio State University Moritz College of Law
- Michael P. Scharf, 1988 – professor of law and director of the Frederick K. Cox International Law Center at Case Western Reserve University School of Law
- Rodney A. Smolla, 1978 – president of Furman University
- Michael Sorrell, 1994 – president of Paul Quinn College
- Kenneth Starr, 1973 – president of Baylor University, dean of Pepperdine University School of Law, United States Solicitor General, and Independent Counsel during the Clinton Administration
- Zephyr Teachout, 1999 – professor of Fordham University School of Law

== Business ==
- John H. Adams, 1962 – founding director of the Natural Resources Defense Council
- John Canning Jr., 1969 – co-founder of Madison Dearborn Partners and co-owner of Milwaukee Brewers
- Gérard Louis-Dreyfus, 1957 – chairman of Louis Dreyfus Energy Services and father of actress Julia Louis-Dreyfus
- Gary Lynch, 1975 – chief legal officer of Morgan Stanley
- Happy R. Perkins, 1980 – former vice president and general counsel of GE Energy
- Gao Xiqing, 1986 – vice chairman, president, and chief investment officer of the China Investment Corporation

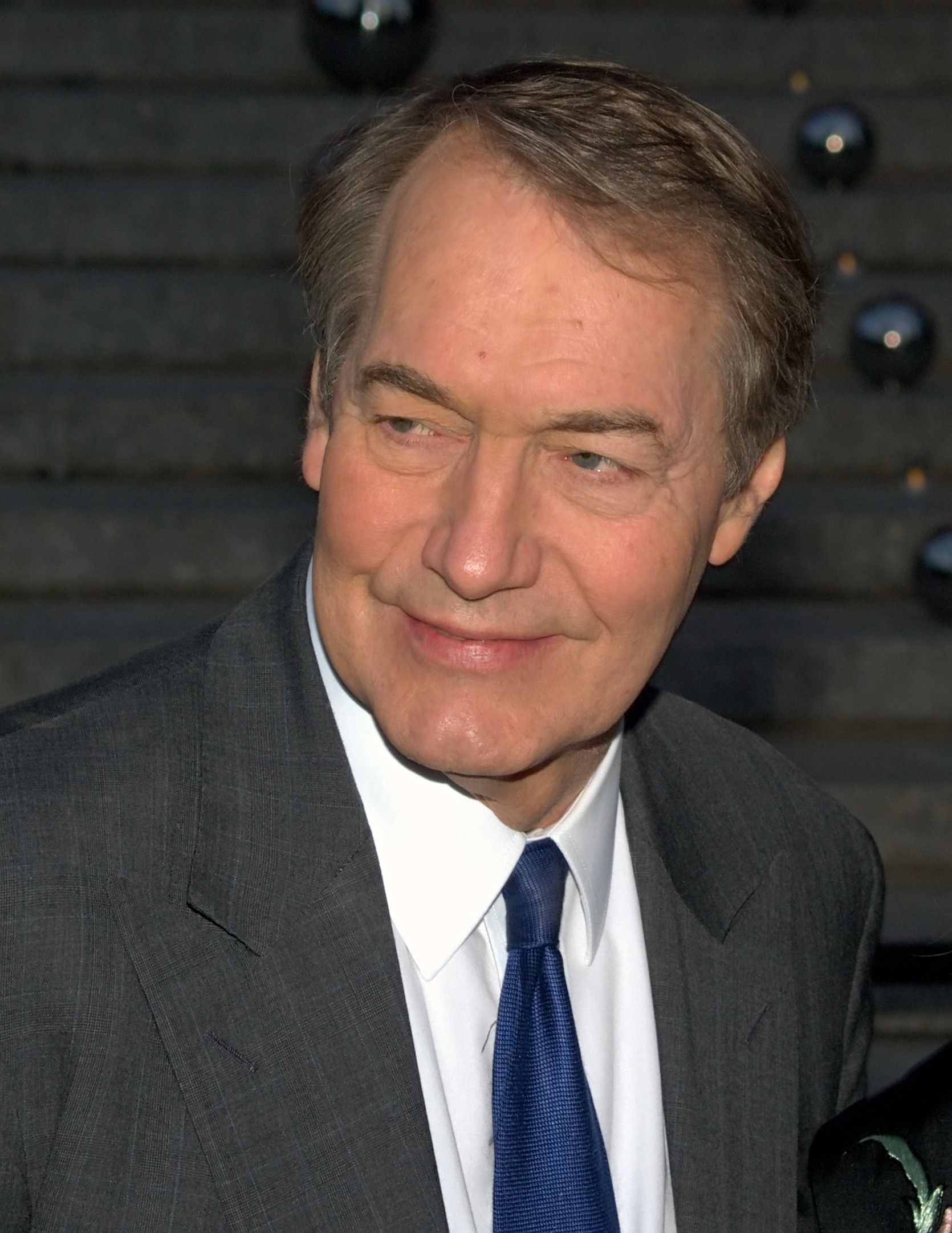
Charlie Rose, PBS TV Host

== Entertainment ==
- Keith Lucas, non-degreed – Academy Award-nominated writer and producer of Judas and the Black Messiah
- Bascom Lamar Lunsford, 1913 – folk musician
- Tucker Max, 2001 – humorist and entrepreneur (associated with "fratire")
- Charlie Rose, 1968 – host of the Charlie Rose Show on PBS
- Monty Sarhan, 1999 – CEO of SkyShowtime
- Teddy Schwarzman, 2006 – Academy Award-nominated film producer, known for The Imitation Game
- Angela Seo, 2015 – avant-garde musician best known for her work in experimental band Xiu Xiu
- David H. Steinberg, 1993 – writer and director for film and television

== Government ==
- Leslie Cooley Dismukes – Secretary of the North Carolina Department of Adult Correction
- Michael Dreeben, 1981 – deputy Solicitor General of the United States, and a member of the legal teams involved in the Special Counsel investigation led by Robert Mueller
- Michael Elston, 1994 – former chief of staff and counselor with the Office of the Deputy Attorney General
- John Jay Hoffman, 1992 – Attorney General of New Jersey
- Kenneth Starr, 1973 – United States Solicitor General, Independent Counsel during the Clinton Administration, president of Baylor University, and dean of Pepperdine University School of Law
- Mark Uyeda, 1995 – U.S. Securities and Exchange Commission commissioner, acting chair (Jan. 20th, 2025 -)

== Judiciary ==
- Philip Aubart, 2013 – U.S. District Court for the Middle District of North Carolina nominee
- Cheri Beasley, LLM 2018 – first Black female chief justice of the North Carolina Supreme Court
- Charles Becton, 1969 – North Carolina Court of Appeals judge
- Garrett Brown Jr., 1968 – U.S. District Court for the District of New Jersey chief judge
- J. Michelle Childs, LLM 2016, U.S. District Court for the District of South Carolina judge
- Robert L. Clifford, 1950 – Supreme Court of New Jersey associate justice
- Curtis Lynn Collier, 1974 – U.S. District Court for the Eastern District of Tennessee senior judge
- Colm Connolly, 1991 – U.S. District Court for the District of Delaware judge
- Timothy J. Corrigan, 1981 – U.S. District Court for the Middle District of Florida judge
- Mark A. Davis, LLM 2018 – North Carolina Supreme Court associate justice
- James C. Dever III, 1987 – U.S. District Court for the Eastern District of North Carolina judge
- Bernice B. Donald, LLM 2018 – United States Court of Appeals for the Sixth Circuit judge
- Allyson Kay Duncan, 1975 – U.S. Court of Appeals for the Fourth Circuit judge
- Christine Durham, 1971 – first female justice of the Utah Supreme Court
- Richard Gergel, 1979 – U.S. District Court for the District of South Carolina judge
- Paul W. Grimm, LLM 2016 – United States District Court for the District of Maryland judge
- David Gustafson, 1981 – United States Tax Court judge
- Eva Guzman, LLM 2014 – Texas Supreme Court justice
- Todd M. Hughes, 1992 – U.S. Court of Appeals for the Federal Circuit judge; first openly gay U.S. Circuit Court Judge
- Carolyn Kuhl, 1977 – Los Angeles Superior Court judge
- Denise Majette, 1979 – former Georgia state judge and former U.S. House of Representative from Georgia
- Sarah A. L. Merriam, LLM 2018,– United States District Court for the District of Connecticut judge
- Mandisa Maya, 1990 – president of the Supreme Court of Appeal of South Africa
- Graham Calder Mullen, 1969 – U.S. District Court for the Western District of North Carolina senior judge
- David Nuffer, LLM 2018 – United States District Court for the District of Utah judge
- William H. Pauley III, 1977 – U.S. District Court for the Southern District of New York senior judge
- Johnnie B. Rawlinson, LLM 2016 – United States Court of Appeals for the Ninth Circuit judge
- Robin L. Rosenberg, 1989 – U.S. District Court for the Southern District of Florida judge
- Allison Jones Rushing, 2007 – U.S. Court of Appeals for the Fourth Circuit judge
- Kenneth Starr, 1973 – U.S. Court of Appeals for the District of Columbia judge
- Gary S. Stein, 1956 – Supreme Court of New Jersey associate justice
- Donna Stroud, LLM 1914 – North Carolina Court of Appeals judge
- A. William Sweeney, 1948 – Supreme Court of Ohio justice
- Patricia Timmons-Goodson, LLM '14 – North Carolina Supreme Court associate justice
- Michael B. Thornton, 1982 – United States Tax Court judge
- Gerald B. Tjoflat, 19'57 – U.S. Court of Appeals for the Eleventh Circuit judge
- Ernest C. Torres, 1968 – U.S. District Court for the District of Rhode Island judge
- Peter Verniero, 1984 – Supreme Court of New Jersey associate justice and New Jersey Attorney General
- Sarah Hawkins Warren, 2008 – Georgia Supreme Court associate justice and Georgia Solicitor General
- Charles K. Wiggins, 1976 – Washington Supreme Court associate justice
- Don Willett, 1992, LLM 2016 – U.S. Court of Appeals for the Fifth Circuit judge and Texas Supreme Court justice
- Mary Ellen Coster Williams, 1977 – U.S. Court of Federal Claims senior judge

== Law ==
- Amy Pope, an American attorney and the 11th Director General of the International Organization for Migration
- Marc Elias, 1993 – partner at Perkins Coie LLP, general counsel for Hillary Clinton's 2016 presidential campaign and John Kerry's 2004 presidential campaign
- Jeffrey Lichtman, 1990 – New York City-based criminal defense attorney, has represented defendants in some of the most high-profile trials in modern American history including John Gotti, Jr. and Joaquin “El Chapo” Guzman.
- Arlinda Locklear, 1976 – lawyer, the first Native American woman to argue a case before the U.S. Supreme Court

== Literature and journalism ==
- Ben Fountain, 1983 – novelist known for Billy Lynn's Long Halftime Walk

== Military ==
- Dan McCarthy, 1983 – JAG chief prosecutor, United States Navy

== Politics ==
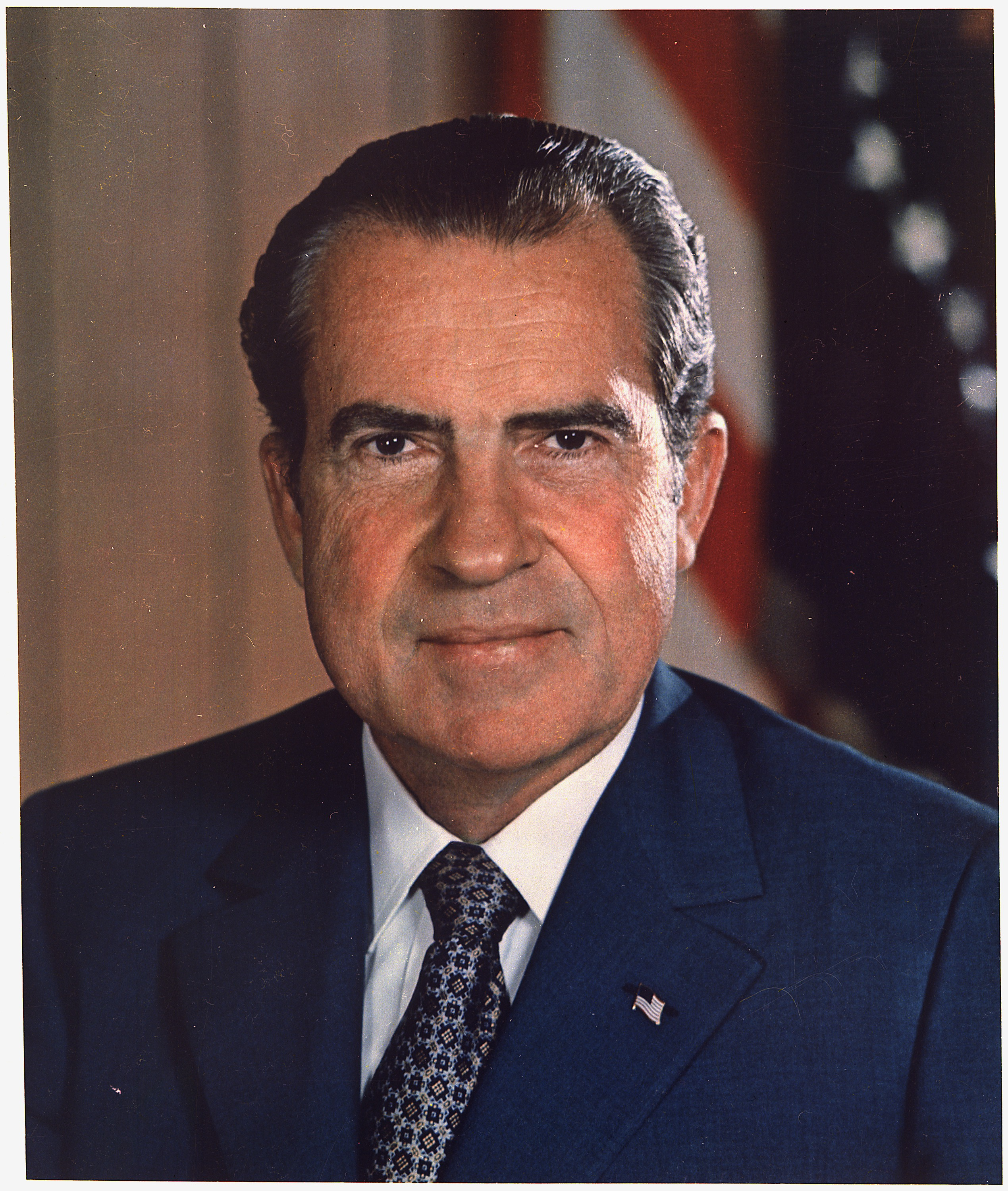
President Nixon

- David Addington, 1981 – chief of staff and former legal counsel to Vice President Dick Cheney, Willis Smith, U.S. Senate from North Carolina
- Claude Allen, 1990 – former Assistant to the President for Domestic Policy
- Daniel T. Blue Jr., 1973 – North Carolina Senate and former speaker of the North Carolina House of Representatives
- Rob Bryan, 1998 - North Carolina Senate and House, UNC BOG and BOT
- Susan Bysiewicz, 1986 – lieutenant governor of Connecticut and former Connecticut Secretary of State
- Bill Campbell, 1977 – mayor of Atlanta, Georgia
- Jim Courter, 1966 – U.S. House of Representatives from New Jersey
- Nick Galifianakis, 1953 – U.S. House of Representatives from North Carolina
- Tom Grady, 1982 – U.S. House of Representatives from Florida
- Jaime Aleman Healy, 1979 – Panama's Ambassador to the United States
- Darren Jackson, 1996 – House Minority Leader, North Carolina House of Representatives
- Mike Levin, 2005 – U.S. House of Representatives from California
- Denise Majette, 1979 – U.S. House of Representatives from Georgia
- David McKean, 1986 – U.S. Ambassador to Luxembourg, former Director of Policy Planning
- Floyd McKissick Jr., 1984 – North Carolina Senate
- Jerry Meek, 1997 – former chairman of the North Carolina Democratic Party
- Richard Nixon, 1937 – 37th president of the United States
- Manuel Sager, 1985 – Swiss Ambassador to the United States
- Dave Trott, 1985 –U.S. House of Representatives from Michigan
- Mike Turzai, 1987 – speaker of the House, Pennsylvania House of Representatives
- William B. Umstead, 1921 – former governor of North Carolina, U.S. Senate, and U.S. House of Representatives for North Carolina

== Religion ==
- D. Todd Christofferson, 1972 – apostle, The Church of Jesus Christ of Latter-day Saints

== Sports ==
- Jay Bilas, 1992 – ESPN commentator and former Duke Blue Devils basketball player and coach
- Jim Drucker 1976 – ESPN legal correspondent, commissioner of the Continental Basketball Association, and commissioner of the Arena Football League
- Matt Jones, 2003 – radio host and controlling owner of Ohio Valley Wrestling
- Drew Rosenhaus, 1990 – sports agent and owner of Rosenhause Sports
- Quin Snyder, 1995 – head coach of the Utah Jazz
- Zachary Kleiman, 2013 – general manager of the Memphis Grizzlies

== Fictional alumni ==
- Lt. Colonel Sarah MacKenzie – fictional character portrayed by Catherine Bell on JAG, earned her Juris Doctor (J.D.) degree from Duke University School of Law
- Sam Seaborn – fictional character portrayed by Rob Lowe on The West Wing, graduated from Duke Law School
