= Gerald Bard Tjoflat =

American federal judge (born 1929)

Gerald Tjoflat
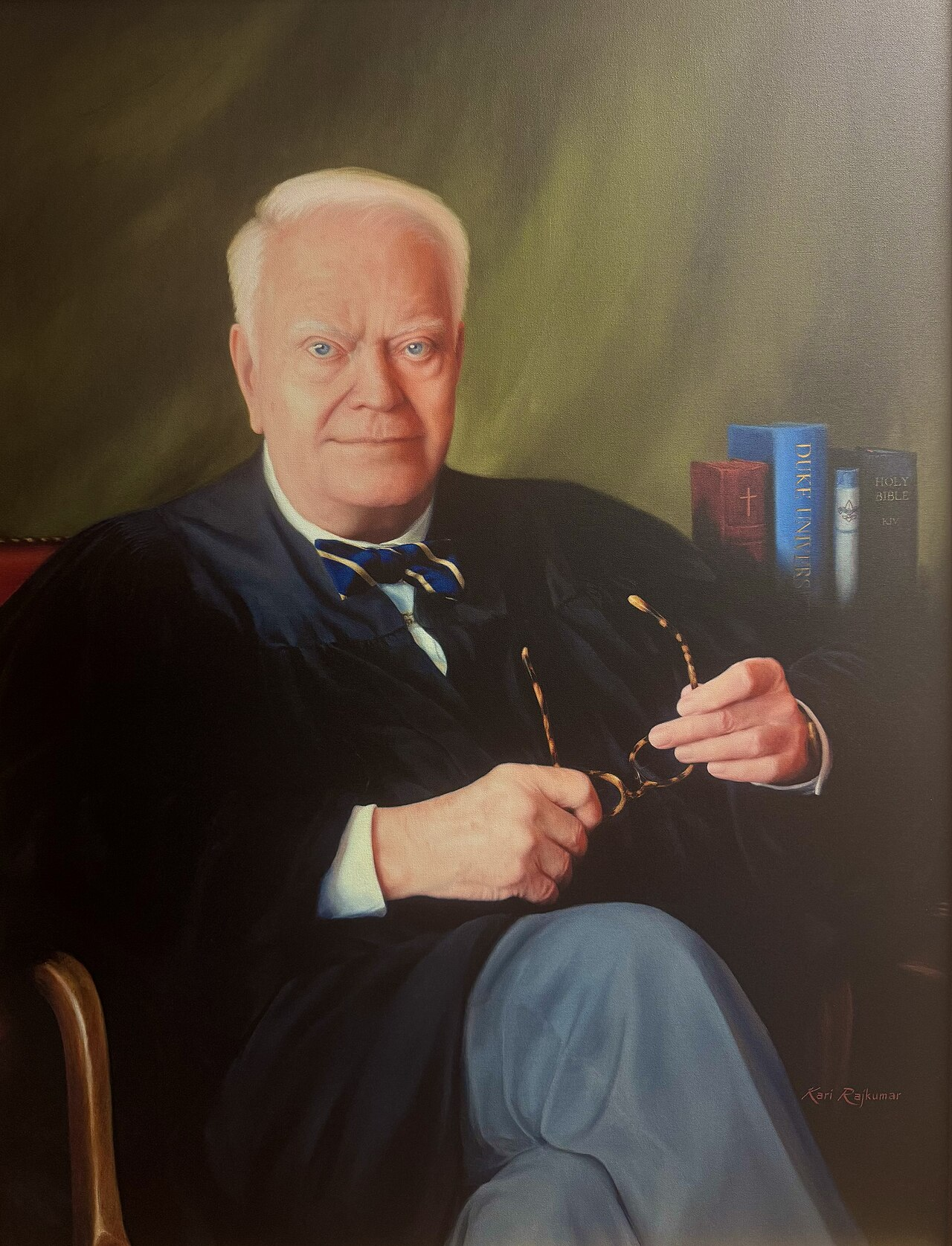
- Portrait of Tjoflat at the Elbert P. Tuttle United States Court of Appeals Building in Atlanta, GA

Senior Judge of the United States Court of Appeals for the Eleventh Circuit
- Incumbent
- Assumed office November 19, 2019

Chief Judge of the United States Court of Appeals for the Eleventh Circuit
- In office October 1, 1989 – September 20, 1996
- Preceded by: Paul Hitch Roney
- Succeeded by: Joseph W. Hatchett

Judge of the United States Court of Appeals for the Eleventh Circuit
- In office October 1, 1981 – November 19, 2019
- Appointed by: Operation of law
- Preceded by: Seat established
- Succeeded by: Robert J. Luck

Judge of the United States Court of Appeals for the Fifth Circuit
- In office November 21, 1975 – October 1, 1981
- Appointed by: Gerald Ford
- Preceded by: John Milton Bryan Simpson
- Succeeded by: Seat abolished

Judge of the United States District Court for the Middle District of Florida
- In office October 16, 1970 – December 12, 1975
- Appointed by: Richard Nixon
- Preceded by: Seat established
- Succeeded by: Howell W. Melton

Personal details
- Born: Gerald Bard Tjoflat; December 6, 1929 (age 96) Pittsburgh, Pennsylvania, U.S.
- Education: University of Virginia; University of Cincinnati (BA); Duke University (LLB)

Gerald Bard Tjoflat (born December 6, 1929) is an American lawyer and jurist serving as a Senior United States circuit judge of the U.S. Court of Appeals for the Eleventh Circuit. He previously served as Chief Judge of the Eleventh Circuit and as a United States district judge on the U.S. District Court for the Middle District of Florida. Tjoflat is currently tied with J. Clifford Wallace as the longest serving living U.S. federal judge.

== Education and career ==
Tjoflat was born in 1929 in Pittsburgh, Pennsylvania. In his youth, Tjoflat was a baseball pitcher and received an offer to work out with the Cincinnati Reds before college. He then attended the University of Virginia on a baseball scholarship. After two years, financial constraints led him to transfer to the University of Cincinnati, where he completed his undergraduate degree.

Tjoflat enrolled in the University of Cincinnati College of Law, but was drafted into the U.S. Army at the end of his first semester to serve in the Korean War. He served in the Counterintelligence Corps until 1955, attaining the rank of corporal. After leaving the Army, Tjoflat returned to Cincinnati and completed his first year of law school. He then transferred to the Duke University School of Law, graduating in 1957 with a Bachelor of Laws. Tjoflat was in private practice in Jacksonville, Florida from 1957 to 1968 and served as a judge of the Fourth Judicial Circuit of Florida in Jacksonville from 1968 to 1970.

== Federal judicial service ==
President Richard Nixon nominated Tjoflat to the United States District Court for the Middle District of Florida on October 7, 1970, to a new seat created by 84 Stat. 294. He was confirmed by the United States Senate on October 13, 1970 and received his commission three days later. His service terminated on December 12, 1975, due to his elevation to the Fifth Circuit.

President Gerald Ford nominated Tjoflat to the United States Court of Appeals for the Fifth Circuit on November 3, 1975, to a seat vacated by Judge John Milton Bryan Simpson. He was confirmed by the Senate on November 20, 1975, received his commission the next day, and began serving on the court on December 12, 1975. Believing the Fifth Circuit had grown too large, Tjoflat supported legislation to split the circuit in two. On October 1, 1981, the United States Court of Appeals for the Eleventh Circuit was created, and Tjoflat was reassigned by operation of law. He served as Chief Judge of the Eleventh Circuit from 1989 to 1996.

On November 19, 2019, Tjoflat assumed senior status. He was the last federal judge in active service appointed by either President Ford (Note: Joel Flaum, originally appointed by Ford to the Northern District of Illinois, would be appointed by Ronald Reagan to the Seventh Circuit and remain in active service until November 30, 2020) or President Nixon. (Note: The last federal judge appointed to his position by Nixon was Joseph Louis Tauro of the District of Massachusetts, who had taken senior status in 2013.) Tjoflat's tenure in active service is the fourth longest by a federal judge in U.S. history. (Note: Tjoflat's 49 years and 34 days in active service is exceeded only by: 1. Henry Potter of the District of North Carolina and the original Fifth Circuit with 56 years and 225 days; 2. William Cranch of the original District of Columbia Circuit with 54 years, 182 days; 3. Manuel Real of the Central District of California with 52 years and one day) Tjoflat continues to regularly sit on cases and author opinions.

=== Potential Supreme Court nomination ===
Following the failure of the Robert Bork nomination in 1987, Tjoflat was placed on the short list of possible nominees for the Supreme Court seat formerly occupied by Lewis F. Powell Jr. Florida Governor Claude R. Kirk Jr. pushed for Tjoflat to be nominated after Douglas H. Ginsburg withdrew. Though Florida Senators Lawton Chiles and Bob Graham both considered Tjoflat more viable than Bork, it was uncertain whether Northeastern Democrats would have found him acceptable. The seat consequently went to Anthony Kennedy.

=== Bill Clinton impeachment testimony ===
In 1999, President Bill Clinton was impeached by the United States House of Representatives on charges of lying under oath and obstruction of justice. The charges stemmed from Clinton's false testimony provided in a deposition related to Paula Jones' lawsuit against the President. Chairman of the House Judiciary Committee Henry Hyde invited Tjoflat to testify at the impeachment hearings alongside Judge Charles E. Wiggins, Elliot Richardson, and Alan Dershowitz. Tjoflat initially declined, but he was threatened with a subpoena. He testified generally about the deleterious nature of perjury in civil cases, describing its ripple effect on the system of justice, but refused to comment on whether the House should move forward with impeachment.

=== Judge Vance bombing ===
Shortly after Tjoflat assumed the role of Chief Judge, Eleventh Circuit Judge Robert Smith Vance was murdered when a pipe bomb was mailed to his house. Bombs were also sent to the Eleventh Circuit courthouse in Atlanta and the NAACP office in Jacksonville. Tjoflat helped to organize the investigation with then Attorney General Dick Thornburgh and Deputy Attorney General Robert Mueller. Walter Moody was ultimately convicted for the crime, which was motivated by the Eleventh Circuit's refusal to expunge his earlier federal conviction for possessing an explosive device.

=== Notable cases ===
- Mims v. Duval County School Board (M.D. Fla. 1971): Following the Supreme Court's opinion in Swann v. Charlotte-Mecklenburg Board of Education, Tjoflat ordered the immediate desegregation of the Duval County Public Schools. His order, among other things, mandated the cross bussing of both White and Black students and closed certain underperforming all-Black schools. In the wake of Mims, Tjoflat and his family received death threats, and there were calls for his impeachment.

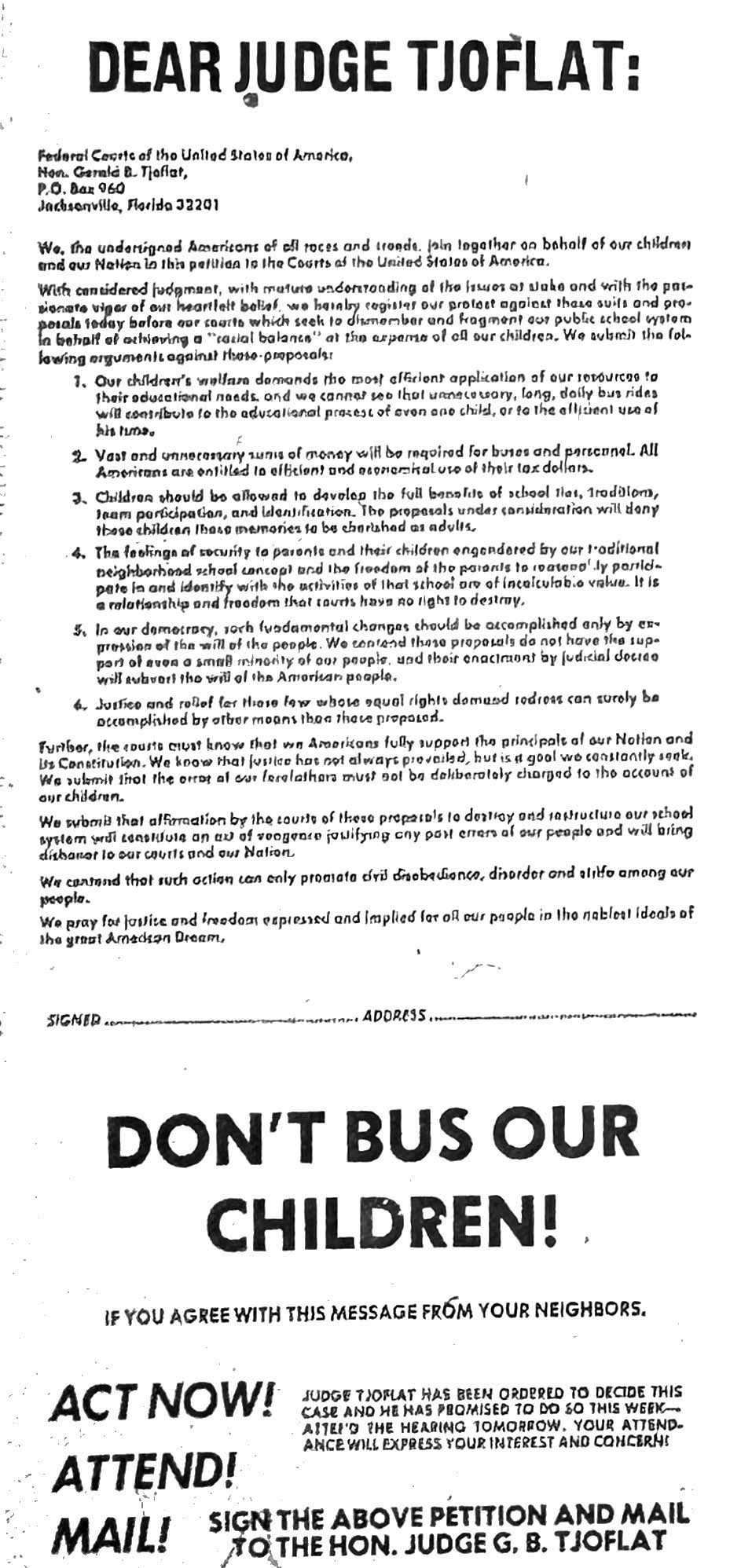
1970 Newspaper Ad

- Hishon v. King & Spalding (11th Cir. 1982): A female lawyer alleged that she was denied entry to her law firm's partnership on the basis of sex. The district court dismissed her case, and the Eleventh Circuit affirmed, holding that "matters of voluntary association such as legal partnerships" were outside the scope of Title VII of the Civil Rights Act of 1964. Tjoflat dissented, arguing that the majority's opinion was "too glib" and that he would reverse the lower court. The Supreme Court agreed with Tjoflat, reversing the panel's majority.
- Siegel v. Lepore (11th Cir. 2000) (en banc): Plaintiffs, including George W. Bush and Dick Cheney sued to stop four Florida counties from conducting manual recounts of the ballots case in the 2000 United States Presidential Election. The district court denied the request for an injunction, and the Eleventh Circuit affirmed. Tjoflat dissented in both the panel opinion and the subsequent en banc opinion. His reasoning was largely adopted by the Supreme Court majority in Bush v. Gore.
- Major League Baseball v. Crist (11th Cir. 2003): Florida's Attorney General began investigating the 2001 Major League Baseball contraction plan for violations of state antitrust law. Florida was concerned that the plan, which promised to eliminate two teams, might impact the Florida Marlins or the Tampa Bay Devil Rays. The Eleventh Circuit, in an opinion authored by Tjoflat, held that the investigation was invalid. The Supreme Court had earlier ruled in Flood v. Kuhn that baseball is exempted from federal antitrust laws. The Eleventh Circuit held that this exemption meant state antitrust laws were also preempted. Tjoflat described the baseball exemption as "a judge-made rule premised upon dubious rationales" but that "a good faith reading of Supreme Court precedent" compelled the ruling.
- Arce v. García (11th Cir. 2006): Plaintiffs, who were kidnapped and tortured during the Salvadoran Civil War, sued José Guillermo García and Carlos Eugenio Vides Casanova under the Torture Victim Protection Act and Alien Tort Claims Act. A jury awarded plaintiffs $56,000,000. On appeal, the defendants argued that the suit was barred by a ten-year statute of limitations. Tjoflat, writing for a unanimous panel, affirmed on the grounds that the statute of limitations was appropriately tolled because the defendants maintained power in El Salvador until 1992 and would have suppressed anyone seeking legal redress. He wrote, "the remedial scheme conceived by the TVPA and the ATCA would fail if courts allowed the clock to run on potentially meritorious claims while the regime responsible for the heinous acts for which these statutes provide redress remains in power, frightening those who may wish to come forward from ever telling their stories."
- Cambridge University Press v. Patton (11th Cir. 2014): Cambridge Press sued Georgia State University officials, alleging the University committed copyright infringement by posting excerpts from academic works on its e-reserve system. The district court issued a 300-plus page opinion, holding that GSU's system largely constituted fair use, but finding 10 instances of infringement out of the 99 claims brought to trial. On appeal, Tjoflat authored the Eleventh Circuit’s decision, which affirmed some of the lower court opinion, but reversed and remanded to reject the district court's "mechanistic" application of the fair use factors and to reject its use of bright-line rules. On remand, the district court found even fewer instances of infringement. The case attracted widespread attention from publishers and academic institutions.
- Moody v. NetChoice, LLC (11th Cir. 2022): In 2021, Florida Governor Ron DeSantis signed SB 7072, which imposed fines on social media companies for de-platforming political figures. It also provided various restrictions on platforms' ability to moderate user content. NetChoice and the Computer & Communications Industry Association sued, and the district court enjoined the law. The Eleventh Circuit upheld the injunction. Kevin Newsom writing for a unanimous panel including Tjoflat and Ed Carnes, held that the law would "chill platforms' protected speech" under the First Amendment. The Supreme Court remanded the case for further analysis on the remedy.

=== Notable law clerks ===
Tjoflat has had over 200 law clerks during his tenure on the federal bench. His clerks have also clerked for the Supreme Court, including for Justices Samuel Alito, Sandra Day O'Connor, William Rehnquist, John Paul Stevens, and Byron White.

- Nick Brod – Solicitor General, North Carolina Department of Justice
- Michael Barry – Dean, American University Washington College of Law
- J. Brett Busby – Justice, Supreme Court of Texas
- Wynne S. Carvill – Former Judge, Superior Court of California, Alameda County
- Nathan Chapman – Associate Dean, University of Georgia School of Law
- Peter L. Dearing – Former Judge, 4th Circuit court (Florida)
- Timothy J. Corrigan – District Judge, United States District Court for the Middle District of Florida
- Stuart Delery – Former White House Counsel and United States Associate Attorney General
- William F. Jung – District Judge, United States District Court for the Middle District of Florida
- Jeremy Kernodle – District Judge, United States District Court for the Eastern District of Texas
- Michael Scharf – Associate Dean, Case Western Reserve University School of Law
- Jamelle C. Sharpe – Dean, University of Illinois College of Law
- Joel Toomey – Magistrate Judge, United States District Court for the Middle District of Florida
- Jack Wilson – Judge, Mississippi Court of Appeals
- Peter D. Webster – Former Judge, Florida First District Court of Appeal

== Memberships and honors ==
In 1995, the Duke Law Journal published a tribute to Tjoflat that included articles by then-Chief Justice William H. Rehnquist, retired Justices Lewis F. Powell, Jr. and Byron R. White, and Judge Edward R. Becker of the U.S. Court of Appeals for the Third Circuit, among others. White also presented Tjoflat with the Fordham-Stein prize the following year.

In 1980 and in 1985, Judge Tjoflat was a member of the United States delegation to the Sixth and Seventh United Nations Congresses for the Prevention of Crime and Treatment of Offenders. In 2022, the appellate court room at the Bryan Simpson United States Courthouse was named in Tjoflat's honor. Tjoflat is a member of the Duke Law School Board of Visitors.

== Personal life ==
Tjoflat met his first wife, Sarah, while attending Duke Law School. They had two children. After Sarah's death, Tjoflat married his second wife, Marcia Tjoflat. His father, an electrical engineer, was of Norwegian ancestry, and his mother was an immigrant from Chile. His Chilean ancestry makes Tjoflat the first Hispanic circuit judge in the United States. Tjoflat's reputation for asking difficult questions during oral argument led him to receive the moniker "Tjoflatosaurus Rex."

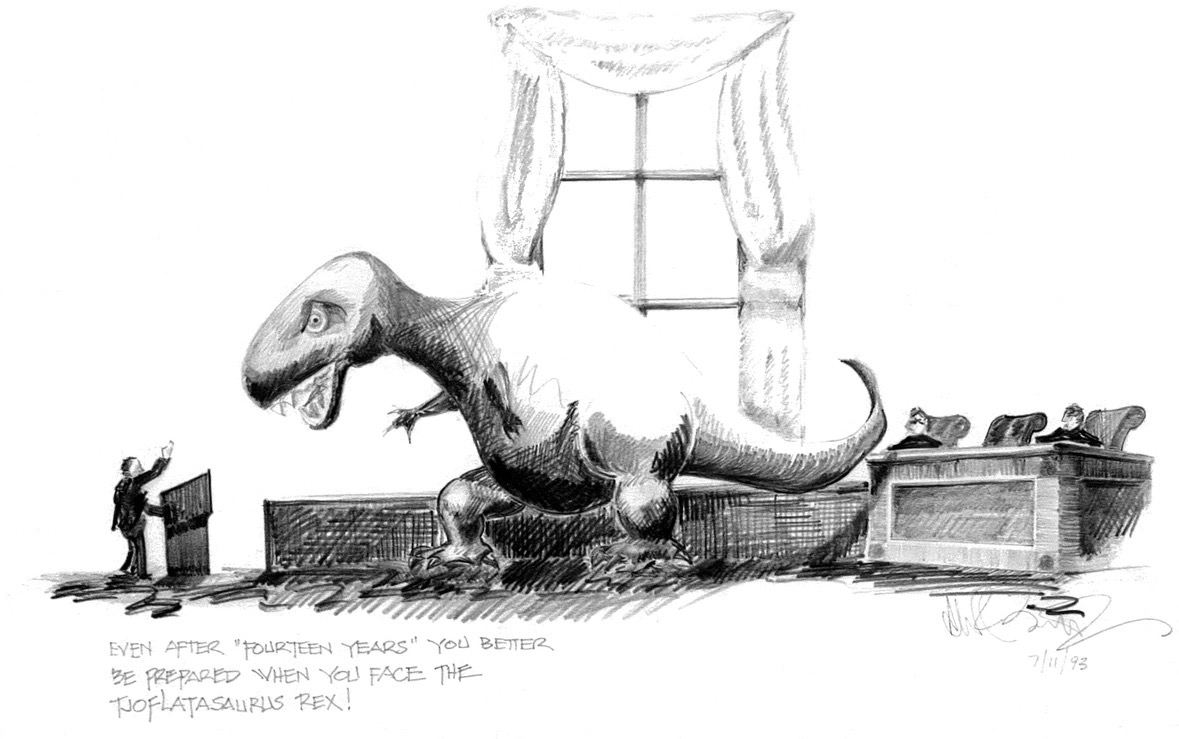
Tjoflatosaurus Rex

== See also ==
- List of United States federal judges by longevity of service
- School integration in the United States
- List of federal judges appointed by Richard Nixon
- List of federal judges appointed by Gerald Ford
- List of Duke University School of Law alumni
- List of University of Cincinnati people

Legal offices
New seat	Judge of the United States District Court for the Middle District of Florida; 1970–1975	Succeeded by Howell W. Melton
Preceded by John Milton Bryan Simpson	Judge of the United States Court of Appeals for the Fifth Circuit; 1975–1981	Seat abolished
New seat	Judge of the United States Court of Appeals for the Eleventh Circuit; 1981–2019	Succeeded by Robert J. Luck
Preceded by Paul Hitch Roney	Chief Judge of the United States Court of Appeals for the Eleventh Circuit; 1989–1996	Succeeded by Joseph W. Hatchett
