= Brian Loughmiller =

American politician

Mayor of McKinney
- In office 2009–2017
- Preceded by: Bill Whitfield
- Succeeded by: George Fuller

Personal details
- Party: Republican
- Spouse: Donna
- Education: Illinois State University (BS); Case Western Reserve University School of Law
- Occupation: Lawyer

Brian S. Loughmiller was the mayor of McKinney, Texas, from 2009 to 2017 after serving two terms as the council member of District 4.

Loughmiller is formerly a managing partner of Loughmiller Higgins, P.C., a McKinney-based firm specializing in family law.

== Election history ==
=== 2009 ===
Mayoral election, 2009
| Party | Candidate | Votes | % | ±% |
|---|---|---|---|---|
| Nonpartisan | Brian Loughmiller | 3,915 | 60.53% | |
| Nonpartisan | George Fuller | 2,553 | 39.47% | |
| Total votes | | 6,524 | | |
| Turnout | | 62,681 | 10.38% | |

== See also ==
- List of mayors of McKinney, Texas
