= Frederick K. Cox International Law Center =

Officers
- Prof. Michael P. Scharf (professor), Director
- Prof. Jacqueline Lipton, Associate Director
- Prof. Robert Strassfeld, Associate Director
- Aylin Drabousky, Manager for Programming

The Frederick K. Cox International Law Center is a research center founded at Case Western Reserve University School of Law that focuses on the legal study of international law. The Center sponsors conferences, visiting lecturers, the Case Western Reserve Journal of International Law, the Case Western Reserve team for the Philip C. Jessup International Law Moot Court Competition, the Summer Institute for Global Justice, and the War Crimes Research Office. Members of the Center do research and write books, articles, and weblogs, for which the Center holds the specification.

The Cox Center was established in 1991 with a multimillion-dollar special endowment by The George Gund Foundation. The Cox Center has also received endowment money and grants from Bruce J. Klatsky, the Wolf Family Foundation, the Yanowitz Family Foundation, and the Open Society Institute.

== War Crimes Research Office ==
Founded in 2002, the War Crimes Research Office undertakes research projects for five war crimes tribunals and other international organizations, hosts a war crimes trial blog and e-newsletter, and sponsors an annual war crimes research symposium.

=== Research Projects ===
The War Crimes Research Portal “contains over a thousand links to websites related to international humanitarian law which are arranged alphabetically by subject area including a summary of each site. Keyword searching is available. A very special feature is the access it provides to … research memoranda on issues pending before the International Criminal Tribunal for the Former Yugoslavia, the International Criminal Tribunal for Rwanda, the Special Court for Sierra Leone, [the Extraordinary Chambers in the Courts of Cambodia,] and the International Criminal Court. Analysis articles and a bibliography are also provided.”

=== Blog ===
The Grotian Moment blog, established in September 2005, is a source of expert advice on war crimes trials such as the trial of Saddam Hussein. It features essays by a panel of experts on developments related to major war crimes trials, as well as newspaper articles, and documents related to the tribunals.

=== Newsletter ===
The Frederick K. Cox International Law Center contributes, together with Public International Law & Policy Group, to the preparation of "War Crimes Prosecution Watch", a biweekly compilation of official documents and articles about the investigation and prosecution of war crimes. It is funded by the Carnegie Corporation of New York and the Open Society Institute.
