= Ralph Brubaker =

American law professor

Ralph Brubaker is an American professor, specializing in bankruptcy, who is currently the Carl L. Vacketta Professor of Law at University of Illinois College of Law and formerly a member of the faculty at Emory University School of Law.
