= Jamelle C. Sharpe =

Dean of the University of Illinois College of Law

- Education: New York University (BA); Yale Law School (JD)
- Occupation: Dean of the University of Illinois College of Law
- Known for: Leading scholar in administrative law
- Title: Dean, University of Illinois College of Law
- Predecessor: Vikram Amar

Jamelle C. Sharpe is a legal scholar in administrative law and the 14th Dean of the University of Illinois College of Law. His research focuses on the division of policymaking authority between courts and administrative agencies, the limits of congressional delegation, and the role of federal courts in the administrative state. He is also the author of Administrative Law: A Lifecycle Approach, a widely used casebook in the field.

== Early life and education ==
Sharpe earned his Bachelor of Arts in English and American Literature magna cum laude from New York University, where he was elected to Phi Beta Kappa. Before entering law school, he worked for three years as an analyst in the Investment Banking Division of Morgan Stanley in New York. He later earned his Juris Doctor from Yale Law School, where he served as managing editor of the Yale Journal of International Law.

== Career ==
After graduating from Yale Law School, Sharpe began his legal career as a litigation associate at Cravath, Swaine & Moore LLP in New York, where he practiced from 2003 to 2005. He then clerked for Judge Gerald Bard Tjoflat of the United States Court of Appeals for the Eleventh Circuit from 2005 to 2006. Following his clerkship, he transitioned to academia, serving as a Bigelow Teaching Fellow and Lecturer in Law at the University of Chicago Law School from 2006 to 2008.

Sharpe joined the University of Illinois College of Law in 2008 as a member of the faculty. Over the course of his career at Illinois, he has taught courses in Administrative Law, Federal Courts, and Immigration Law. Between 2013 and 2016, he served as the Senior Associate Dean for Academic Affairs, helping to guide the school’s curriculum and academic policies. In 2015–2016, he was selected as a fellow in the CIC Academic Leadership Program, and in 2017, he was named a Provost Fellow for the University of Illinois Urbana-Champaign.

In recognition of his scholarship, Sharpe was appointed Guy Raymond Jones Faculty Scholar, one of the law school’s named faculty positions. In August 2023, he became the 14th Dean of the University of Illinois College of Law, where he oversees the school’s academic programs, faculty development, and student success initiatives.

=== Scholarship ===
Sharpe is regarded as a leading voice in administrative law scholarship. His articles have appeared in numerous law journals and his 2018 article “Delegation and Its Discontents” won the Carroll P. Hurd Award for Excellence in Faculty Scholarship. His casebook Administrative Law: A Lifecycle Approach (Aspen Casebook Series) earned the Wayne R. LaFave Award for Excellence in Faculty Scholarship in 2022.

== Personal life ==
Sharpe is married to Nicola Faith Sharpe, a Professor of Law at the University of Illinois College of Law, who teaches business law and whose research centers on corporate governance, ethics, and board decision-making.
