= Robert J. Luck =

American judge (born 1979)

Robert Luck
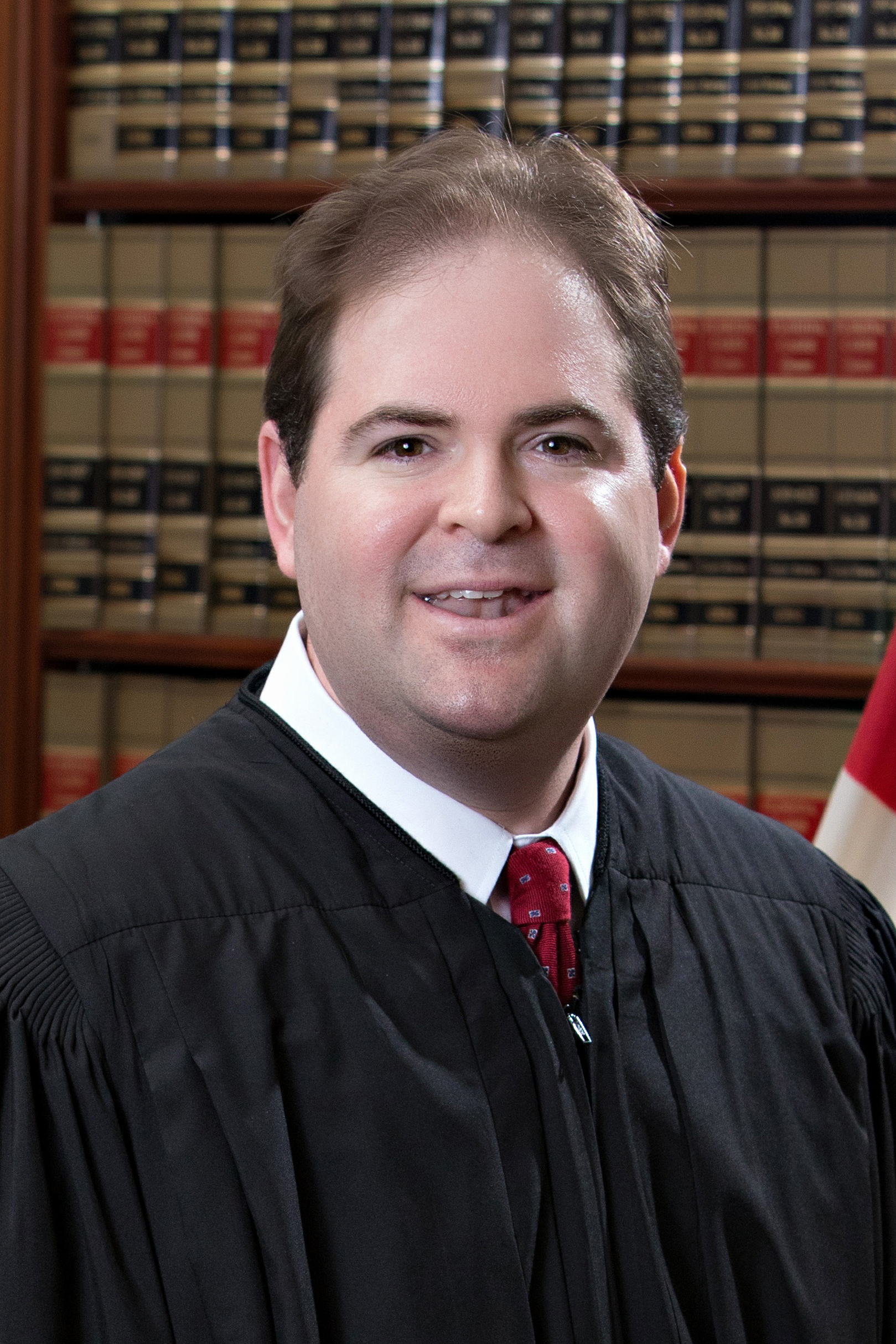

Judge of the United States Court of Appeals for the Eleventh Circuit
- Incumbent
- Assumed office November 19, 2019
- Appointed by: Donald Trump
- Preceded by: Gerald Bard Tjoflat

Justice of the Florida Supreme Court
- In office January 14, 2019 – November 19, 2019
- Appointed by: Ron DeSantis
- Preceded by: Barbara Pariente
- Succeeded by: Jamie Grosshans

Judge of the Florida Third District Court of Appeal
- In office March 6, 2017 – January 14, 2019
- Appointed by: Rick Scott
- Preceded by: Frank Sheperd
- Succeeded by: Fleur Lobree

Personal details
- Born: Robert Joshua Luck; March 17, 1979 (age 47) South Miami, Florida, U.S.
- Education: University of Florida (BA, JD)

Robert Joshua Luck (born March 17, 1979) is an American lawyer and jurist who serves as a United States circuit judge of the United States Court of Appeals for the Eleventh Circuit. He was a justice of the Florida Supreme Court in 2019. A Miami native, he previously served as an assistant United States attorney and as a judge on the Eleventh Judicial Circuit Court of Florida and then the Florida Third District Court of Appeal.

== Background ==
Luck was born on March 17, 1979, to a Jewish American family in South Miami, Florida. He grew up in North Miami Beach. After high school, Luck studied economics at the University of Florida, graduating in 2000 with a Bachelor of Arts degree with highest honors. He worked as a legislative correspondent for United States Senators Paul Coverdell and Jon Kyl from 2000 to 2001, then attended the University of Florida's Fredric G. Levin College of Law, where he was editor-in-chief of the Florida Law Review. He graduated in 2004 with a Juris Doctor magna cum laude and Order of the Coif membership.

Luck was a law clerk for Judge Edward Earl Carnes of the United States Court of Appeals for the Eleventh Circuit from 2004 to 2005. He spent a year in private practice at the law firm Greenberg Traurig, then returned to Carnes's chambers to work as a staff attorney and law clerk from 2006 to 2008. In 2008, he returned to Miami as an assistant United States attorney for the Southern District of Florida.

== Judicial career ==
=== State judicial service ===
He was appointed to the Dade County Circuit Court in June 2013 by Florida Governor Rick Scott. He was later appointed to the Florida Third District Court of Appeal in March 2017, where he served as a judge.

On January 14, 2019, Governor Ron DeSantis selected Luck to be a justice on the Supreme Court of Florida. He resigned from the court after being appointed to the federal appellate court.

=== Federal judicial service ===
On September 12, 2019, President Donald Trump announced his intent to nominate Luck to a seat on the United States Court of Appeals for the Eleventh Circuit. On October 15, 2019, his nomination was sent to the Senate. President Trump nominated Luck to the seat being vacated by Judge Gerald Bard Tjoflat, who had previously announced his intention to assume senior status upon confirmation of a successor. Luck was unanimously rated well-qualified by the American Bar Association for the appellate position. On October 16, 2019, a hearing on his nomination was held before the Senate Judiciary Committee. On November 7, 2019, his nomination was reported out of committee by a 16–6 vote. On November 18, 2019, the Senate invoked cloture by a 61–30 vote. On November 19, 2019, his nomination was confirmed by a 64–31 vote. He received his judicial commission on the same day.

== See also ==
- List of Jewish American jurists

Legal offices
Preceded by Barbara Pariente	Justice of the Florida Supreme Court; 2019	Succeeded by Jamie Grosshans
Preceded by Gerald Bard Tjoflat	Judge of the United States Court of Appeals for the Eleventh Circuit; 2019–present	Incumbent
