= List of mayors of McKinney, Texas =

The following is a list of mayors of the city of McKinney, Texas, United States.

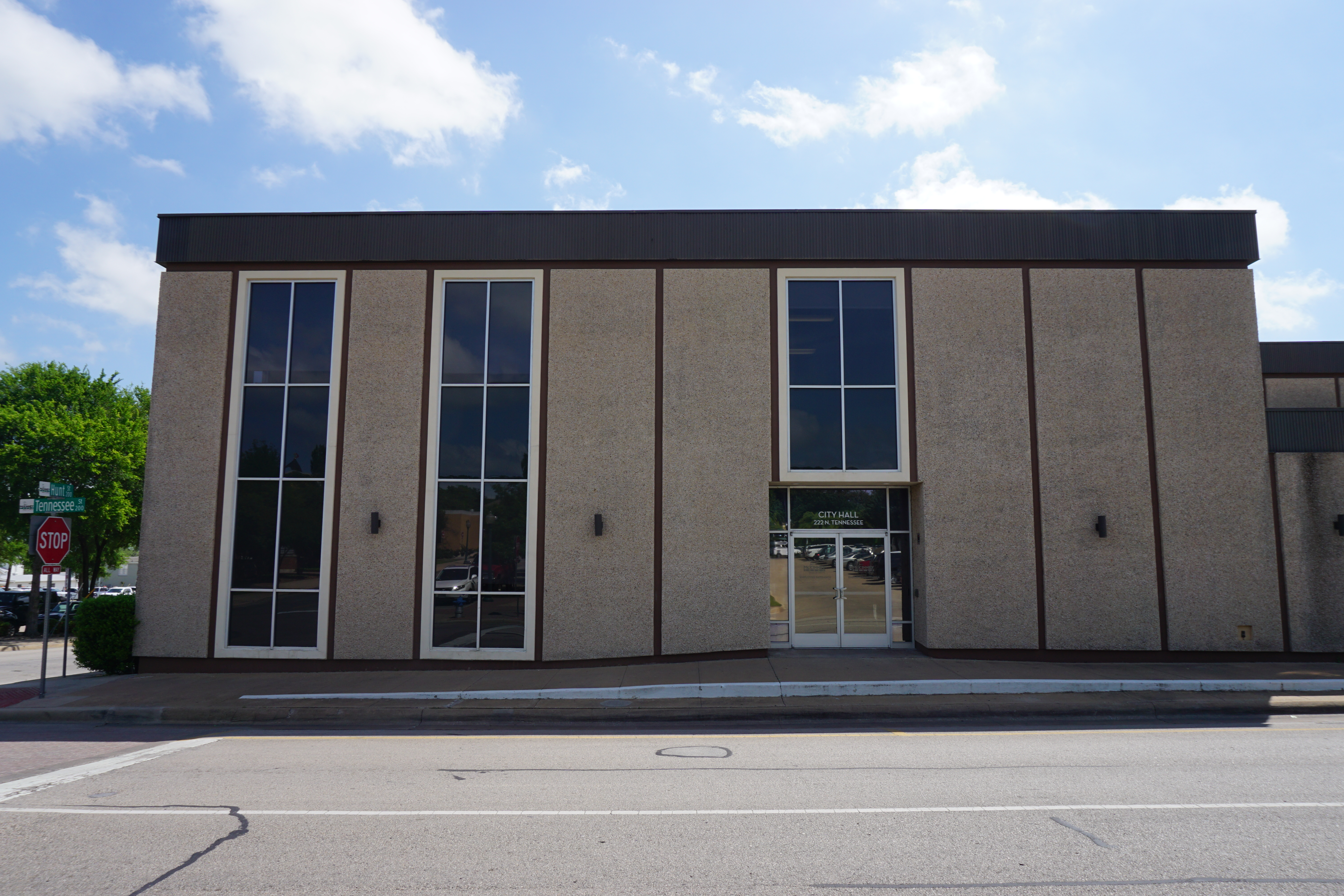
Former city hall building in McKinney, Texas (photo 2017)

- James Madison Pearson, c. 1899–1902
- Thomas Willis "Tom" Perkins Sr., c. 1905, 1943
- Joe E. Largent, 1935–1938
- Robert Fitzhugh Newsome, 1945–1955
- George W. Smith, c. 1957
- Roy Hall, c. 1960–1961
- A. H. Eubanks Jr., c. 1961
- Tom W. Perkins Jr., 1965–1966
- W. B. Finney, c. 1967–1971
- Al Ruschhaupt, c. 1974
- John Benton Whisenant, 1987-1991 (See 14:30 in video)
- John Edward Gay, 1991–1997
- Don Dozier, c. 1997–2000
- Bill Whitfield, c. 2008
- Brian Loughmiller, 2009–2017
- George Fuller, 2017–2025
- Bill Cox, 2025–present

== See also ==
- McKinney history
