= Jamie Grosshans =

American judge (born 1978)

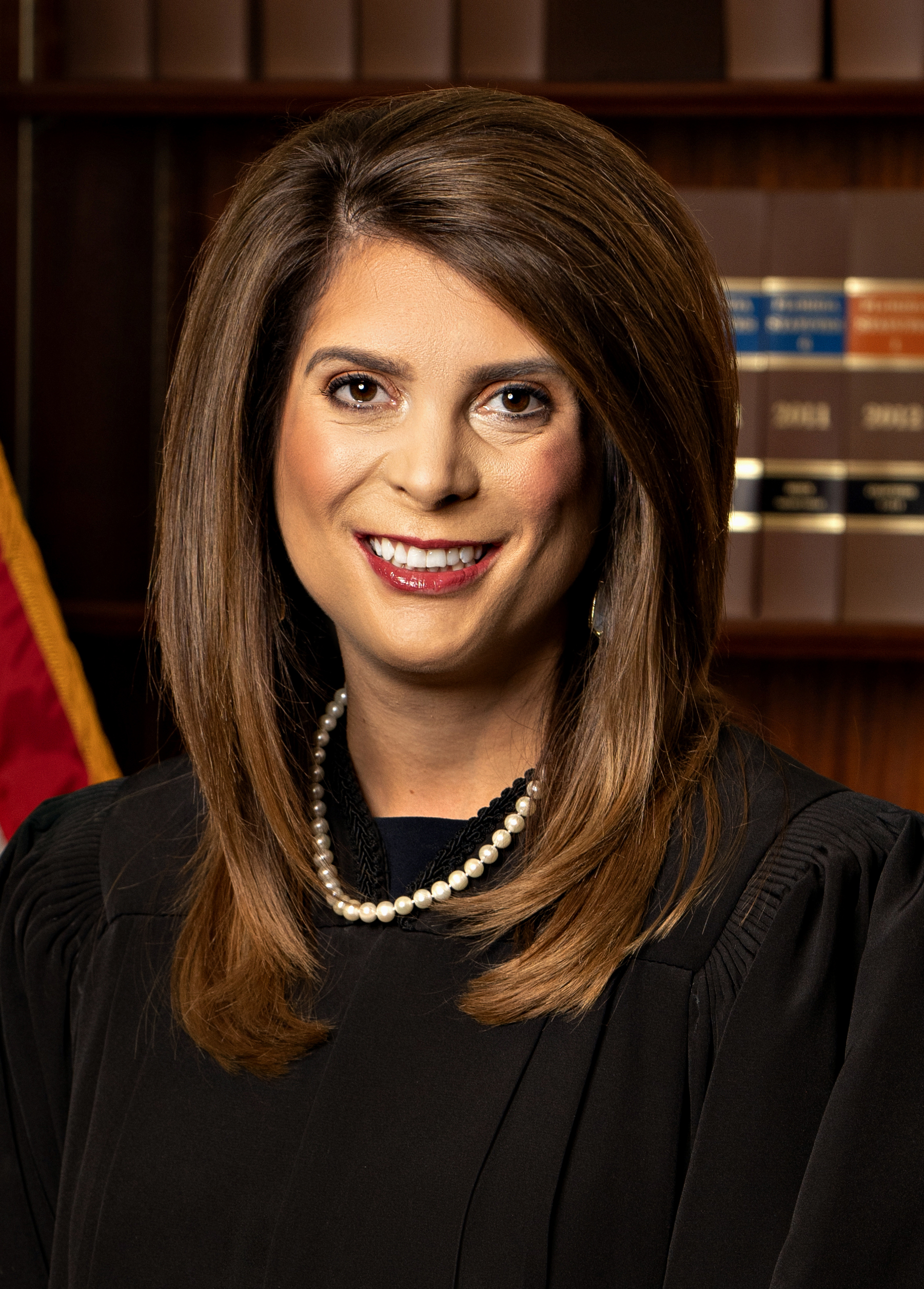

Justice of the Supreme Court of Florida
- Incumbent
- Assumed office September 14, 2020
- Appointed by: Ron DeSantis
- Preceded by: Robert J. Luck

Judge of the Florida Fifth District Court of Appeal
- In office August 31, 2018 – September 15, 2020
- Appointed by: Rick Scott
- Preceded by: William D. Palmer
- Succeeded by: Mary Alice Nardella

Personal details
- Born: October 27, 1978 (age 47) Florida
- Children: 3
- Education: Thomas Edison State College (BA); University of Mississippi (JD)

Jamie Rutland Grosshans (born October 27, 1978) is a justice of the Supreme Court of Florida.

== Early life and career ==
Grosshans was born in Florida, grew up as an adoptee in Brookhaven, Mississippi, and graduated cum laude from the University of Mississippi School of Law. During law school, she clerked for the United States Department of Justice Civil Rights Division in Washington, D.C., and the United States Attorney’s Office for the Northern District of Mississippi. Following admittance to The Florida Bar, she served as an Assistant State Attorney for Orange County, Florida in both the misdemeanor and felony divisions where she tried numerous criminal jury trials.

Grosshans later founded her own law firm where she focused on family law and criminal defense matters for nearly ten years. In her family law practice, Grosshans represented individuals in dissolution of marriage, child support and paternity matters, modifications, adoptions and other domestic issues. She also served as a Guardian ad Litem in domestic cases and dependency court.

In her criminal defense practice, she represented individuals charged with misdemeanors and felonies as well as juvenile delinquency, violation of probation and injunction matters. During this time she also served as an adjunct professor at Valencia College where she taught Hospitality Law for the Hospitality and Tourism Management Program for seven years.

Grosshans has been an active member of the Orange County Bar Association, the Central Florida Association of Women Lawyers, and the George C. Young Inns of Court. She regularly speaks to lawyers and law students on topics such as challenges in the practice of law, the role of judges, criminal law, and family law.

In 2011, she worked for Operation Outcry in Orlando, Florida "in helping a 16-year-old girl whose parents were trying to force her into having an abortion."

Grosshans is a member of the Christian Legal Society and a Blackstone Fellow of the Alliance Defending Freedom.

== State Supreme Court ==
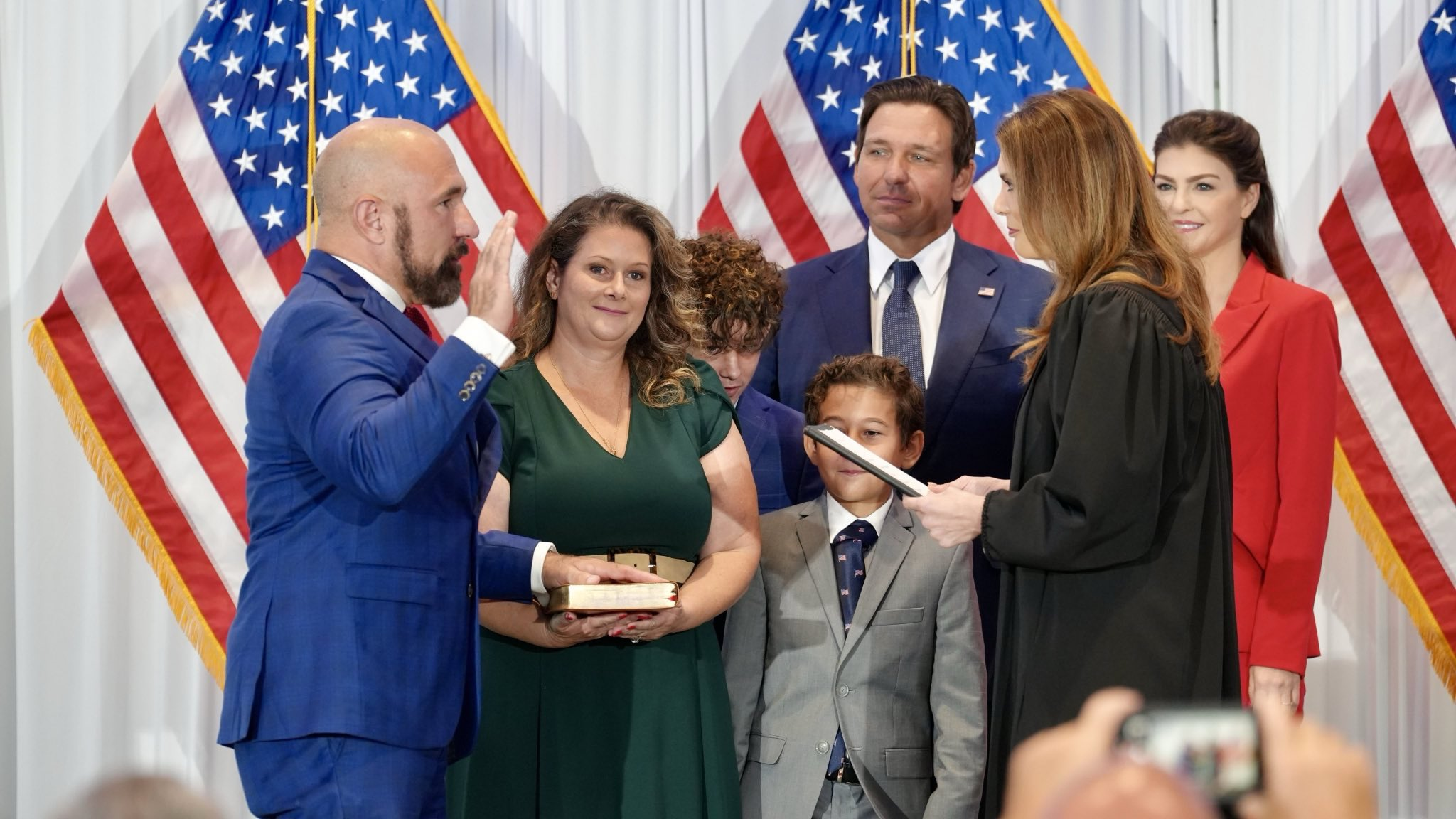
Grosshans swearing-in Jay Collins as Lieutenant Governor in August 2025

Grosshans was appointed to the Supreme Court of Florida on September 14, 2020 by Ron DeSantis. Previously she was appointed to the Florida Fifth District Court of Appeal in 2018 by Rick Scott. Prior to her appointment to the appellate court, she served as an Orange County Court Judge in the Ninth Judicial Circuit of Florida where she presided over criminal and civil matters.

On August 12, 2025, Grosshans swore-in Jay Collins as the 21st lieutenant governor of Florida.

== Personal life ==
Grosshans is married to Joshua D. Grosshans. Justice Grosshans and her husband have three children and reside in Winter Garden, Fla.

Legal offices
Preceded by Robert J. Luck	Justice of the Supreme Court of Florida; 2020–present	Incumbent
