= Barbara Pariente =

American judge

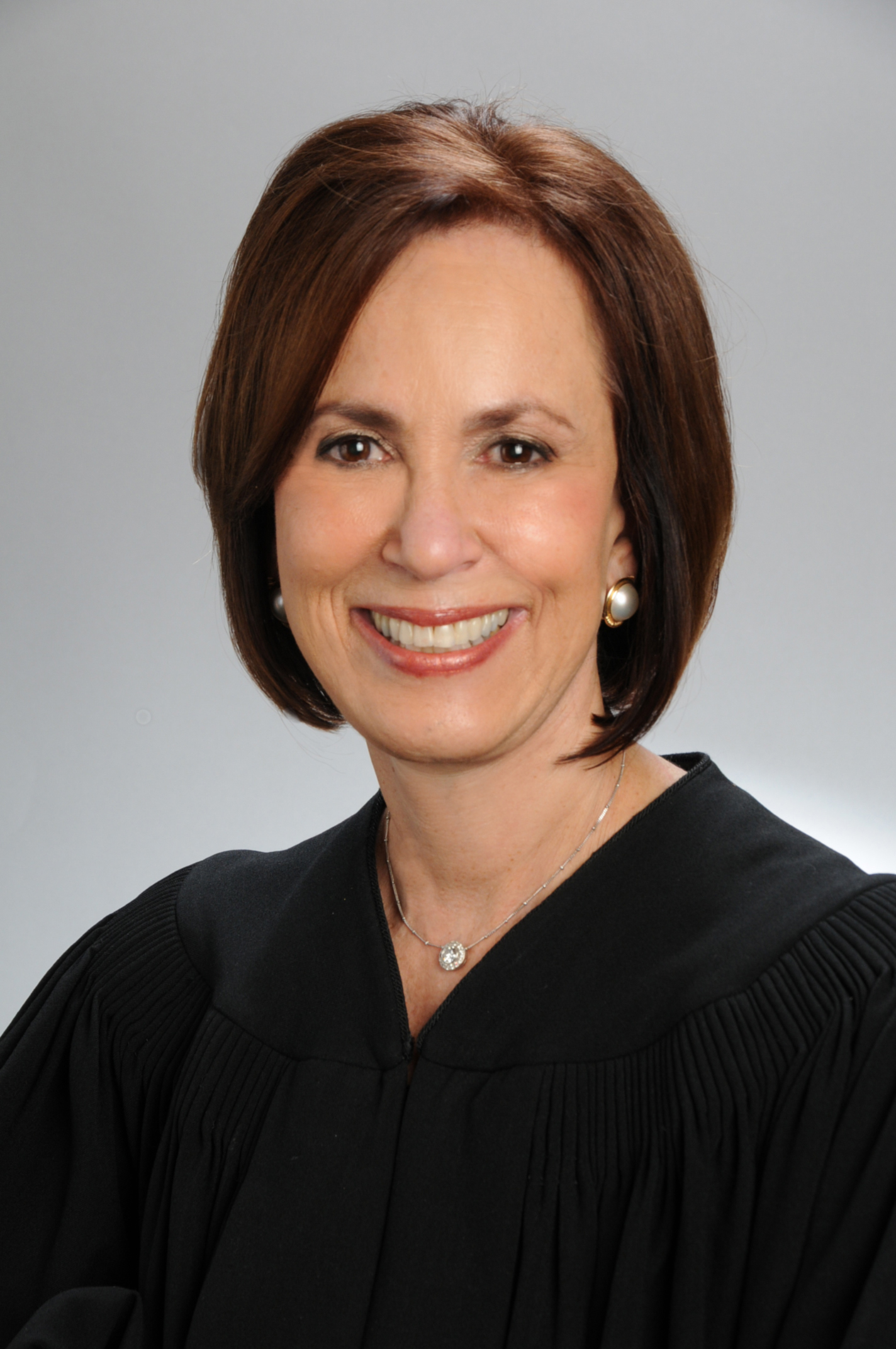

Chief Justice of the Florida Supreme Court
- In office July 1, 2004 – June 30, 2006
- Preceded by: Harry Lee Anstead
- Succeeded by: R. Fred Lewis

Justice of the Supreme Court of Florida
- In office December 10, 1997 – January 8, 2019
- Appointed by: Lawton Chiles
- Preceded by: Stephen H. Grimes
- Succeeded by: Robert J. Luck

Personal details
- Born: December 24, 1948 (age 77) New York City, New York, U.S.
- Spouse: Fred A. Hazouri
- Education: Boston University (BA); George Washington University (JD)
- Website: Official Site

Barbara Joan Pariente (born December 24, 1948) is an attorney and jurist from Florida. She was chief justice of the Supreme Court of Florida from 2004 to 2006. Pariente is the second woman to hold the position of chief justice and served on the court from 1997 to 2019. From 1993 to 1997, she was a judge on Florida's Fourth District Court of Appeal.

== Early life and education ==
Pariente was born in New York City in 1948. She attended public schools in New York and lived in Tenafly, New Jersey, where she graduated from Tenafly High School in 1966. She attended Boston University, graduating with a Bachelor of Arts degree in communications with the highest honors. Pariente later attended the George Washington University Law School, receiving her Juris Doctor in 1973, graduating fifth in her class, and was elected a member of the Order of the Coif.

== Career ==
In 1973, Pariente moved to Fort Lauderdale, Florida for a two-year clerkship under Judge Norman C. Roettger, Jr. of the United States District Court for the Southern District of Florida.

After finishing her clerkship in 1975, Pariente moved to West Palm Beach and joined the civil law firm of Cone, Wagner and Nugent, becoming a partner in 1977. In 1983, Pariente formed the law firm of Pariente & Silber. During Pariente's 18 years in private practice, she was active in the Florida Bar—serving on the Fifteenth Judicial Circuit Grievance Committee, Florida Bar Civil Rules Committee, and Fifteenth Judicial Circuit Nominating Commission—and organized Palm Beach County's first Bench-Bar Conference.

Pariente also was a founding member and master of the Palm Beach County chapter of the American Inns of Court and was a longtime member of the board of directors of the Palm Beach County chapter of the Legal Aid Society.

=== Judicial service ===
In September 1993, Pariente was appointed to Florida's Fourth District Court of Appeal by Governor Lawton Chiles. She served on the district appellate court until December 10, 1997, when Chiles appointed her a justice of the Florida Supreme Court.

During Pariente's term on the court, she worked to reform the family law system in Florida and served as liaison and later the chair of the Supreme Court's Steering Committee on Families and Children in the Courts. Pariente was also a member of the Governor's Advisory Committee on Character Education (1999) and the Florida Bar's Commission on the Legal Needs of Children (2000–2002).

In March 2003, Pariente was diagnosed with breast cancer and underwent a radical double mastectomy and a full course of chemotherapy. During her treatment, she was noted for never missing an oral argument or judicial conference. Her decision after treatment to sit on the bench without wearing a wig during televised court proceedings was widely hailed as a breakthrough for other women in treatment.

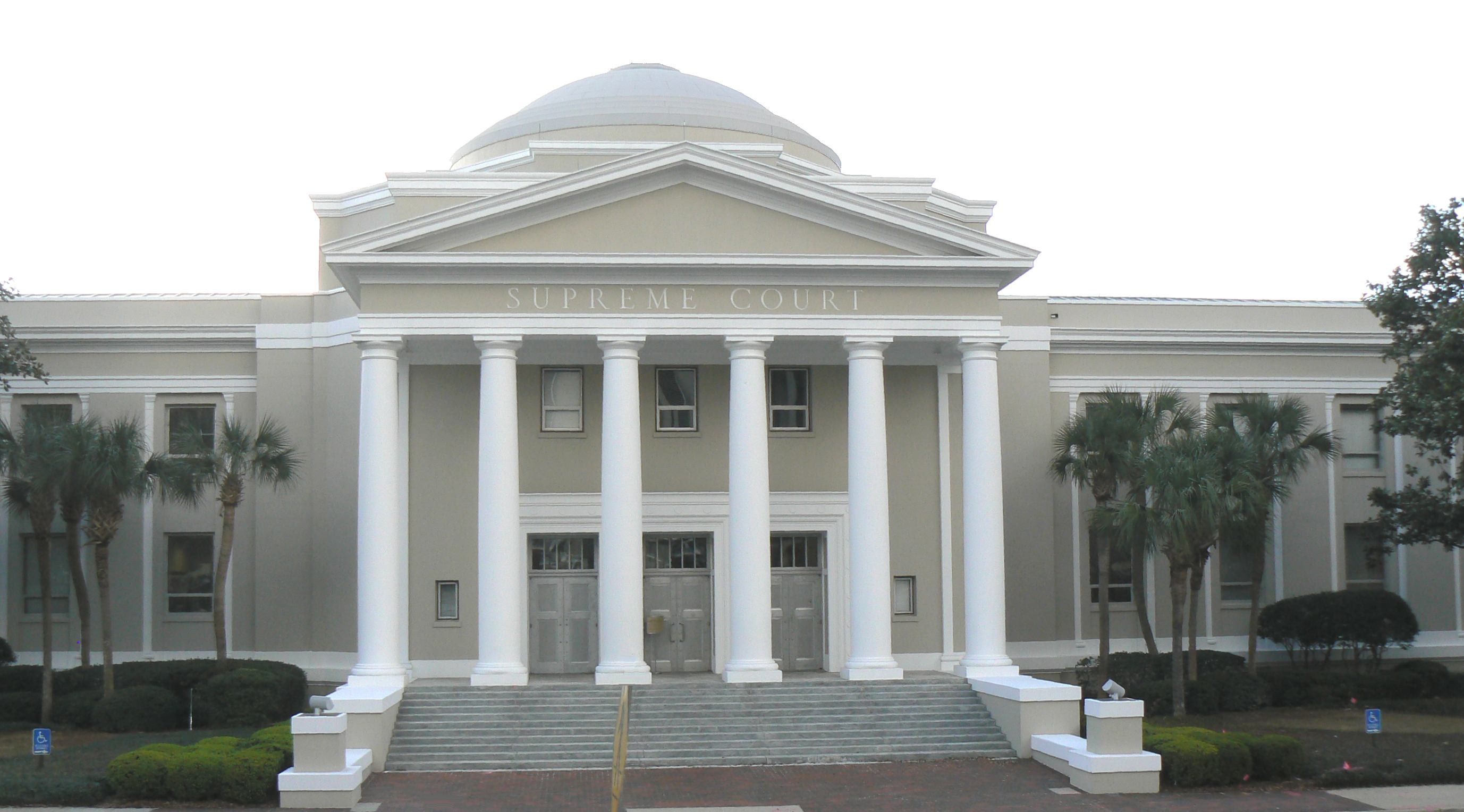
Florida Supreme Court Building

Pariente was the author of the 2004 decision in Jeb Bush v. Michael Schiavo, which ruled unconstitutional a law passed by the Republican-controlled Florida Legislature authorizing Governor Jeb Bush to intervene in the Terri Schiavo case.

In January 2006, Pariente authored a decision in Jeb Bush v. Ruth Holmes, ruling Florida's Opportunity Scholarship Program offering children in failing public schools their choice of an alternative school including a private or parochial school unconstitutional. As a result, some Republican legislators pledged to campaign against Pariente in November, when she faced a routine merit retention vote. While no organized campaign against Pariente's retention resulted, no Florida judge has ever been removed from office as a result of organized campaigns. In the 2006 general election, Pariente won retention by receiving 67.6% of the vote. She won retention again in 2012 by a similar margin, despite organized opposition from several groups and the state Republican Party.

== Awards and honors ==
- Pariente is Jewish and has received the Palm Beach County Jewish Federation's Lifetime Achievement Award in 1998 and the Jewish Museum's "Breaking the Glass Ceiling" award in 2002.
- Distinguished Alumni Achievement Award (George Washington University, 2006)
- On March 11, 2008, Florida Governor Charlie Crist inducted Justice Pariente into the Florida Women's Hall of Fame.

== See also ==
- List of female state supreme court justices
- List of Jewish American jurists
