= University of Illinois Law Review =

- Discipline: Law
- Language: English
- Edited by: Michael Lathwell

Publication details
- Former name: University of Illinois Law Forum
- History: 1949-present
- Publisher: University of Illinois College of Law
- Frequency: 5/year

Standard abbreviations
- Bluebook: U. Ill. L. Rev.
- ISO 4: Univ. Ill. Law Rev.

Indexing
- ISSN: 0276-9948
- LCCN: sf86092814
- OCLC no.: 819407771

Links
- Journal homepage; Online access; Online archive

The University of Illinois Law Review is a law review published five times per year by students at the University of Illinois College of Law.

== History ==
In 1917, University of Illinois law students founded the Illinois Law Bulletin, which was renamed the Illinois Law Quarterly in 1922. In 1924, students from the law schools of the University of Illinois, Northwestern University, and the University of Chicago launched the Illinois Law Review, which ran until 1932. It was then replaced by a "current law section" in the Illinois Bar Journal, which was published until 1949. That year, the University of Illinois Law Forum was established by students under the guidance of John E. Cribbet; it was renamed the University of Illinois Law Review in 1980. It was published quarterly until 2001, when the Board of Editors changed its frequency to five issues per year.
