= Happy R. Perkins =

American lawyer

Happy Ray Perkins (born October 4, 1955) is an American lawyer and past vice-president of the General Electric Company and GE Energy.

== Early life and education ==
Perkins was born on October 4, 1955, in Jessamine County, Kentucky, to Cecil and Louise Perkins. Happy earned his undergraduate degree (B.A., political science, with highest honors; Phi Beta Kappa) from the University of Kentucky, and graduated at the top of his class (Order of the Coif) from the Duke Law School where he was an editor of the Duke Law Journal.

== Career ==
Following his admission to the Kentucky Bar Association, he served as a judicial law clerk to the chief judge of the U.S. Court of Appeals. He practiced corporate, tax, and business law at Frost Brown Todd (formerly Brown Todd & Heyburn) in Louisville and was an equity partner.

Perkins became an officer (vice president) of the General Electric Company in 1997, while serving as General Counsel of GE Appliances. He later joined GE Energy as its Vice President and General Counsel in 2002. He retired from the General Electric Company in 2012.

Perkins was a member of the Atlanta Pro Bono Partnership for seven years and the recipient of the 2011 Founders award. The organization later created the "Happy Perkins Award" in his honor in 2013.

Perkins currently serves on the Duke Law Board of Visitors as a senior member. He and his wife have established the Happy R. and Cheri W. Perkins scholarship at the Duke Law School.
