= Monty Sarhan =

American media executive

Monty Sarhan is an American executive. He is the CEO of SkyShowtime, a streaming service that is a joint venture of Comcast and Paramount Skydance. Sarhan was named CEO in January 2022.

He previously worked at Comcast as well as Epix, where he served in a number of roles including as the Executive Vice President and General Manager. He was responsible for securing additional distribution for Epix and launching the Epix Now subscription video on demand service. He previously oversaw the network's programming, acquisitions, and scheduling teams and was responsible for the network's short- and long-term programming strategy. Part of the initial team that launched Epix in 2009, Sarhan was previously the Senior Vice President in charge of all business affairs for the network. In that capacity, he worked on distribution, digital strategy, business development, programming and film acquisitions, and production deals for the network. He also negotiated key agreements that allowed Epix to become the first premium network to offer subscribers access on Android devices, Roku, Microsoft Xbox and Sony PlayStation.

Sarhan left Epix briefly to serve as General Counsel and Senior Vice President of WWE, a publicly traded entertainment company, before returning to lead Epix's programming acquisitions.

Prior to joining Epix, Sarhan worked at Viacom Media Networks, a division of Viacom, where he handled a variety of transactions, including handling console and online gaming for the MTV Games group and Viacom's then-subsidiary Harmonix Music Systems. He was part of the team that launched the successful Rock Band video game franchise.

Sarhan is the former sole founder, CEO and Editor-in-Chief of Cracked Entertainment, the parent company of Cracked Magazine and Cracked.com. In late 2005, Sarhan acquired the assets of Cracked Entertainment and reinvented the brand, taking it from a children's comics magazine and relaunching it in 2006 as a comedy, satire and parody brand for 18- to 34-year-old men. was launched in 2006 implementing Sarhan's new editorial formula and has since grown to become one of the country's leading comedy sites. It is ranked in the top 400 of all U.S. sites.

Prior to acquiring Cracked, Sarhan practiced corporate law in both Boston and New York City, including at the law firm White & Case. He is a graduate of Tufts University, Boston University and Duke University Law School. Sarhan remains active in fundraising and other activities for his alma mater.
