= SkyShowtime =

European video streaming service

- Logo used since 2022
- Website type: OTT streaming platform
- Dissolved: 2027
- Headquarters: London, England, U.K.
- Area served: Albania, Andorra, Bosnia & Herzegovina, Bulgaria, Croatia, Czechia, Denmark, Finland, Hungary, Kosovo, Montenegro, North Macedonia, Norway, Netherlands, Poland, Portugal, Romania, Serbia, Slovakia, Slovenia, Spain, and Sweden
- Owners: Comcast (50%); Skydance (50%)
- Key people: Monty Sarhan (CEO)
- Parent: Sky Group (50%); Skydance Direct-to-Consumer (50%)
- Website: Official website
- IPv6 support: Yes
- Registration: Required
- Users: ▲10 million (estimated) (as of 14 September 2026)
- Launched: 20 September 2022; 4 years ago
- Current status: Active

SkyShowtime is a European joint-venture between the Sky Group unit of Comcast, a sister to NBCUniversal, and the Direct-to-Consumer unit of Skydance, which combines programming from their respective Peacock and Paramount+ streaming services as well as Sky Studios. SkyShowtime launched in European markets where Sky does not operate their satellite and cable services, with viewers in countries like the United Kingdom and Republic of Ireland getting access to Paramount+ on their Sky Q and NOW boxes along with Sky Glass television sets instead. Follow a period of strategic review, on 18 November 2026, the joint-venture announced it would wind down operations by the end of 2027.

== History ==
On 18 August 2021, Comcast and Paramount Global announced the formation of a joint venture to launch a new subscription video on demand service that would launch in over 20 European markets encompassing 90 million homes, including key markets such as Spain, Poland, Portugal, Netherlands, and the Nordic countries. SkyShowtime was structured with equal investment and joint control by Paramount Global and Comcast.

On 11 January 2022, Monty Sarhan was named CEO of SkyShowtime.

The service was launched in the Nordic countries on 20 September 2022, where it replaced the previously operated Paramount+. It arrived in the Netherlands and Portugal on 25 October 2022. On 14 December 2022, SkyShowtime launched in Bosnia and Herzegovina, Bulgaria, Slovenia, Serbia, Croatia, Montenegro, and Kosovo. SkyShowtime launched on 14 February 2023 in the rest of Central and Eastern Europe (including Hungary and Poland, where it replaced the previously operated SVOD service of Paramount+, known as Paramount Play in Poland). It finished its roll-out by launching in Spain and Andorra on 28 February 2023, with its content later being incorporated as part of more expensive packages in the Spanish TV operator Movistar Plus+ at the beginning of 2024.

On 10 January 2023, SkyShowtime announced the acquisition of 21 HBO Max original scripted series produced in Europe that were initially developed for the HBO streaming platform and television channels across the Nordics, Spain, and Central and Eastern Europe. In total, the acquired series accounted for over 150 hours of local original programming. The programming became available after Warner Bros. Discovery, as part of its post-merger restructuring, decided to no longer produce originals in the Nordics, Central and Eastern Europe, and the Netherlands. The majority of the shows were already in production or had been already finished. New shows that had never premiered on HBO were part of the deal and were branded as SkyShowtime Originals, including “ID” (Finland and Sweden), “The Winner” (Czechia and Slovakia) and “Warszawianka” (Poland). SkyShowtime also premiered the second season of the HBO España original series “Por H o Por B,”, the first season of which also became available on the service. In its first year, SkyShowtime premiered ten Original Series, including four acquired as part of the HBO deal.

In addition to the streaming service, SkyShowtime also has two linear television channels in some of the regions where the service is available. These were initially available in the Nordic countries, inherited from Paramount+, before being expanded to Spain on 15 January 2024, albeit only one of the channels became available and is exclusive to the Spanish TV operator Movistar Plus+, to Romania on 25 April 2024 exclusive to Digi, to Poland on 22 August 2024 exclusive to Play, to Bulgaria on 12 October 2024 exclusive to A1 Bulgaria, to Serbia on 14 November 2024 exclusive to A1 Srbija, and to Hungary on 27 November 2024 exclusive to Magyar Telekom.

On 16 February 2024, it was announced that SkyShowtime would increase prices on 23 April in all of its territories except in Poland, while on the same day an ad tier would be launched, with its pricing being either reduced or retained in comparison with the original value of the service, depending on the region.

On 8 October 2024, it was announced that a new tier would be implemented under the name SkyShowtime Premium on 29 October across all territories. This new tier would allow for more downloads to watch offline, more simultaneous streams and the ability to watch content in 4K.

On 14 September 2026, ahead of the acquisition of Warner Bros. Discovery by Paramount Skydance, SkyShowtime received notice from its board that a "review of strategic options for the business" had begun, which included the possibility of winding down the service. On 18 November, the SkyShowtime board announced the review concluded, with Comcast and Skydance opting to shutdown the service at the end of 2027.

== Programming ==
SkyShowtime features many series from the Law & Order franchise, library and new series from Showtime such as crime drama Dexter, family drama Ray Donovan, American Gigolo, and the Taylor Sheridan productions for Paramount Network and Paramount+ such as Yellowstone, and Tulsa King. It also includes other shows from Paramount+ such as Frasier among others as well as originals such as Bosé.

Regarding movies, the service includes films from Paramount Pictures and Universal Pictures such as Top Gun: Maverick, Jurassic World Dominion, Minions: The Rise of Gru, The Northman, Sing 2, Trolls World Tour, Sonic the Hedgehog 2, The Lost City, Downton Abbey: A New Era, Nope, Belfast, Ambulance, and The Bad Guys.

- Also includes content produced or distributed by:
  - Skydance
  - Paramount Pictures
  - Universal Pictures
  - United International Pictures
  - DreamWorks Animation
  - Nickelodeon
  - Showtime
  - Comcast
  - NBCUniversal
  - Sky Studios
  - CBS
  - NBC
  - Some films, series, documentaries, etc. from other production companies and distributors outside of these.

== Launch ==
Release date	Country/territory
20 September 2022	Denmark
20 September 2022	Finland
20 September 2022	Norway
20 September 2022	Sweden
25 October 2022	Netherlands
25 October 2022	Portugal
14 December 2022	Bosnia and Herzegovina
14 December 2022	Bulgaria
14 December 2022	Croatia
14 December 2022	Montenegro
14 December 2022	Serbia
14 December 2022	Slovenia
14 February 2023	Albania
14 February 2023	Czech Republic
14 February 2023	Hungary
14 February 2023	Kosovo
14 February 2023	North Macedonia
14 February 2023	Poland
14 February 2023	Romania
14 February 2023	Slovakia
28 February 2023	Andorra
28 February 2023	Spain

== See also ==
- List of streaming media services
- Video on demand
