= Case Western Reserve Journal of International Law =

- Discipline: American law, International law
- Language: English

Publication details
- Publisher: Case Western Reserve University School of Law
- Frequency: Annually

Standard abbreviations
- Bluebook: Case W. Res. J. Int'l L.
- ISO 4: Case West. Reserve J. Int. Law

Indexing
- ISSN: 0008-7254

Links
- Journal homepage

The Case Western Reserve Journal of International Law is a legal journal produced by student editors at Case Western Reserve University School of Law in Cleveland, Ohio, United States. It was established in 1968, and published three times per year by student editors until 2015, when the journal became annual. The journal includes symposia-based, scholarly articles and transcripts of speeches that address topics of international legal significance.

In collaboration with the Frederick K. Cox International Law Center, JIL sponsors legal symposia on broad topics, drawing noteworthy experts from around the world to Cleveland, Ohio. Past events focused on subjects such as the lessons of the trial of Saddam Hussein, bioterrorism, and torture and the war on terror.
