= Michael Scharf =

Michael P. Scharf Professor of International Law
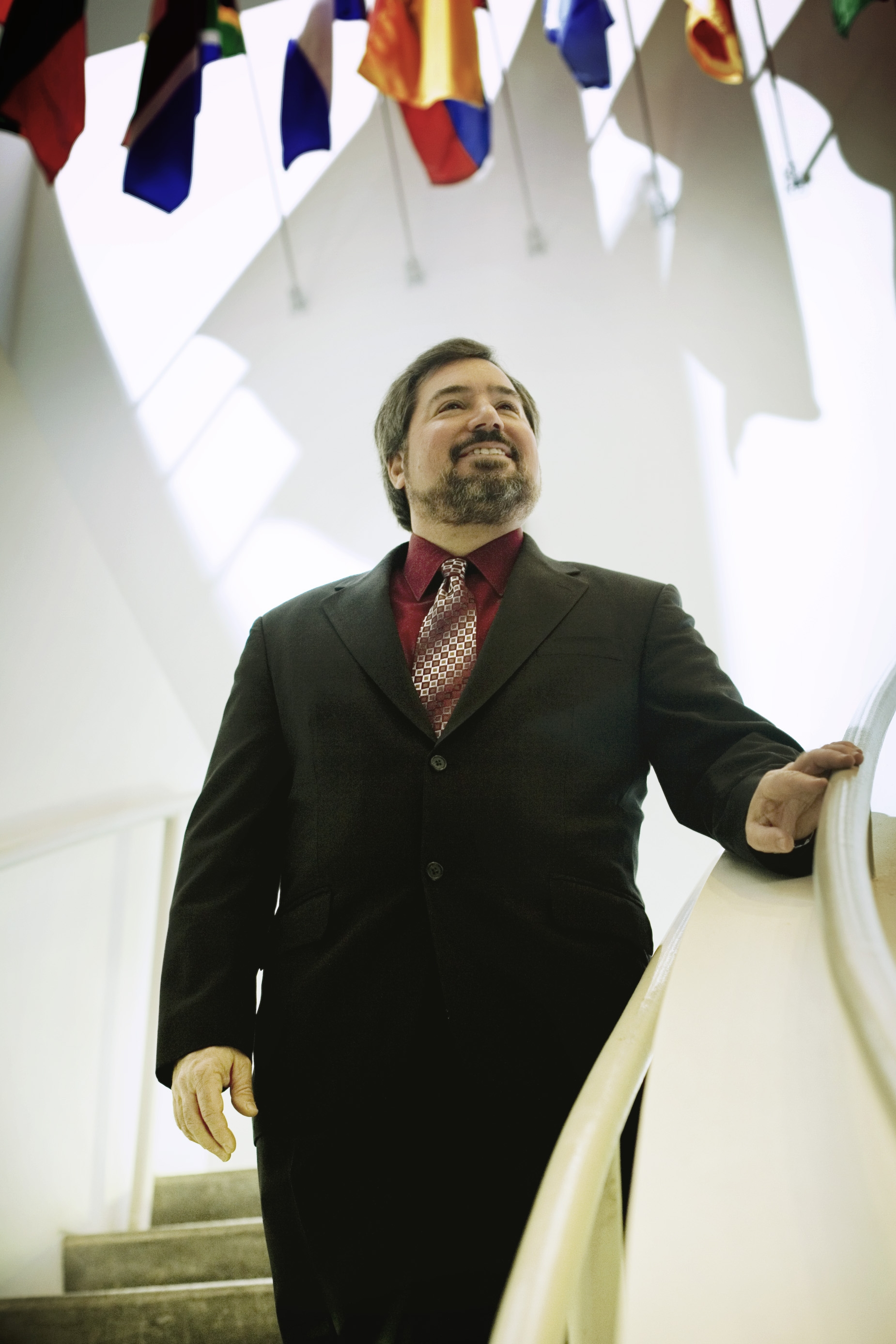
- Born: April 25, 1963 (age 63)
- Education: Duke University; Duke University School of Law
- Scientific career
- Fields: International law
- Workplaces: Case Western Reserve University School of Law

Michael P. Scharf (born April 25, 1963 in Pittsburgh, PA) is the Associate Dean for Global Legal Studies, Joseph C. Hostetler – BakerHostetler professor of law, and the director of the Frederick K. Cox International Law Center at Case Western Reserve University School of Law, previously serving as Co-Dean from 2013 to 2024. Scharf is also co-founder of the Public International Law & Policy Group (PILPG), a non-governmental organization (NGO) which provides pro bono legal assistance to developing states and states in transition. Since 1995 PILPG has provided pro bono legal assistance to states and governments involved in peace negotiations, drafting post-conflict constitutions, and prosecuting war criminals. Since March 2012, Scharf has also been the producer and host of Talking Foreign Policy, a one-hour radio program aired on a quarterly basis on Cleveland’s NPR affiliate WCPN 90.3 ideastream.

== Career ==
On February 14, 2022, Michael Scharf presented an oral argument before the Appeals Chamber of the International Criminal Court in The Hague concerning burdens of proof in the Dominic Ongwen appeal. His Amicus brief advocated for adoption of the Evidentiary Production Approach to burdens of proof under Articles 66 and 67 of the Rome Statute. In 2020, Michael Scharf was elected President of the American Branch of the International Law Association, an organization dedicated to the study, clarification and development of International Law and the advancement of peace, equity and justice worldwide.

In 2014, Scharf co-founded the International Criminal Court Moot with Prof. Carsten Stahn at the Grotius Centre for International Legal Studies of Leiden Law School. Since then, he has served as a member of the Organizing Committee, case and bench memorandum draft lead, and Chair of the Board of Advisors.

In 2013, Scharf headed a Blue Ribbon Committee that drafted a statute for a War Crimes Tribunal for Syrian atrocities.

In 2004–06, Scharf served as a member of the international team of experts that provided training and assistance to the judges of the Iraqi High Tribunal, and in 2008 he served as special assistant to the international prosecutor of the Cambodia Tribunal.

In 2002, Scharf established the War Crimes Research Office at Case Western Reserve University School of Law, which provides research assistance to the prosecutors of the International Criminal Tribunal for Rwanda, the Special Court for Sierra Leone, the International Criminal Court, the Cambodia Genocide Tribunal, and the Iraqi High Tribunal on issues pending before those international tribunals.

During the first Bush and Clinton Administrations, Scharf served in the Office of the Legal Adviser of the U.S. Department of State, where he held the positions of Attorney-Adviser for Law Enforcement and Intelligence, Attorney-Adviser for United Nations Affairs, and delegate to the United Nations Human Rights Commission. In 1993, he was awarded the State Department's Meritorious Honor Award "in recognition of superb performance and exemplary leadership" in relation to his role in the establishment of the International Criminal Tribunal for the former Yugoslavia.

An internationally recognized expert in international criminal law, Scharf has testified before the U.S. Senate Committee on Foreign Relations and the House Armed Services Committee; his interviews and op eds have appeared in The Washington Post, Los Angeles Times, The Boston Globe, The Christian Science Monitor, and International Herald Tribune; and he has appeared on ABC World News Tonight, the NBC Today Show, Nightline, The O'Reilly Factor, The NewsHour with Jim Lehrer, Minnesota Public Radio, Public Radio International (PRI), The Charlie Rose Show, the BBC, CNN, Voice of America, and NPR. Scharf also hosts Grotian Moment, an award-winning International Criminal Law Blog. He is a frequent contributor of scholarly articles to the American Society of International Law. Scharf was selected as a lifetime member of the Council on Foreign Relations in 2019.

== Personal interests ==
Scharf is a fan of Star Trek and in 1994 co-authored an article titled "The Interstellar Relations of the Federation: International Law and Star Trek the Next Generation" in the Toledo Law Review which was subsequently republished in the book Star Trek Visions of Law and Justice.

Since 2011, Scharf has produced and hosted "Talking Foreign Policy", a radio program broadcast on Cleveland’s NPR Station, WCPN 90.3 Ideastream.

Scharf and his law professor-student band, Razing the Bar, perform regularly at Dave's Cosmic Subs, and have performed at the Rock and Roll Hall of Fame and Cleveland Aquarium.

== Bibliography ==
=== Books ===
- The Syria Conflict's Impact on International Law (Cambridge University Press, 2020) (with M. Sterio and P. Williams)
- The Legacy of Ad Hoc Tribunals in International Criminal Law. Cambridge University Press (2019) (with M. Sterio) (winner of the 2019 International Association of Penal Law, American Nat’l Section’s Book of the Year Award for Scholarly Contribution to the Field).
- The Founders. Cambridge University Press (2018) (with D. Crane and L. Sadat).
- Prosecuting Maritime Piracy: Domestic Solutions to International Crimes. Cambridge University Press (2015)(with M. Sterio and M. Newton).
- Customary International Law in Times of Fundamental Change: Recognizing Grotian Moments. Cambridge University Press (2013)
- International Criminal Justice: Legitimacy and Coherence. Edward Elgar (2012). With G. Boas and W. Schabas.
- Shaping Foreign Policy in Times of Crisis: The Role of International Law and the State Department Legal Adviser. Cambridge University Press (2010)
- Criminal Jurisdiction 100 Years After the 1907 Hague Peace Conference. T.M.C. Asser Press/Cambridge University Press (2009). With Willem J.M. van Genugten.
- The Theory and Practice of International Criminal Law. Martinus Nijhoff Publishers (2008). With Leila Sadat.
- Enemy of the State: The Trial and Execution of Saddam Hussein. St. Martin's Press (2008). With Michael A. Newton. (Winner of the International Association of Penal Law's 2009 Book of the Year Award for Scholarly and Theoretical Contribution to the Field.)
- The Law of International Organizations.
- International Criminal Law.
- Saddam on Trial: Understanding and Debating the Iraqi High Tribunal.
- Peace with Justice? War Crimes and Accountability in the Former Yugoslavia. Rowman & Littlefield (2002). With Paul Williams. (Winner of the International Association of Penal Law's 2003 Book of the Year Award for Scholarly and Theoretical Contribution to the Field.)
- Slobodan Milosevic on Trial: A Companion. Continuum Press (2002). With William Schabas.
- The International Criminal Tribunal for Rwanda. Transnational Publishers (1998). (2 vols) With Virginia Morris. (Winner of the 1999 American Society of International Law Certificate of Merit for the Outstanding Book in International Law).
- Making Justice Work. Century Foundation Press (1998). With Paul Williams and Diane Orentlicher.
- Balkan Justice: The Story Behind the First International War Crimes Trial Since Nuremberg. (Nominated for the Pulitzer Prize)
- An Insider’s Guide to the International Criminal Tribunal for the Former Yugoslavia. Transnational Publishers (1995).

=== Articles and op-eds ===
- "Syria may be using chemical weapons against its citizens again – here’s how international law has changed to help countries intervene," The Conversation, (December 6, 2018).
- "ISIS Has Changed International Law," The Conversation, (March 31, 2016).
- "The Iraqi High Tribunal: A Viable Experiment in International Justice?" Journal of International Criminal Justice (April 2007).
- "Outlook: Trying Saddam", The Washington Post (December 20, 2004).
- "Don’t Just Fight Him; Indict Him", Los Angeles Times (October 6, 2002).
- "Prosecute Terrorists on a World Stage", Los Angeles Times (November 18, 2001). With Paul R. Williams.
- "The Lockerbie Trial Verdict", ASIL Insights (February 2001).
- "The Special Court for Sierra Leone", ASIL Insights (October 2000).
- "The Indictment of Slobodan Milosevic", ASIL Insights (June 1999).
- "Results of the Rome Conference for an International Criminal Court", ASIL Insights (August 1998).
- "Rome Diplomatic Conference for an International Criminal Court", ASIL Insights (June 1998).
