= University of Illinois College of Law =

Public law school in Champaign, Illinois, US

Coordinates: 40°6′3.6″N 88°13′53.6″W

University of Illinois College of Law at Urbana-Champaign
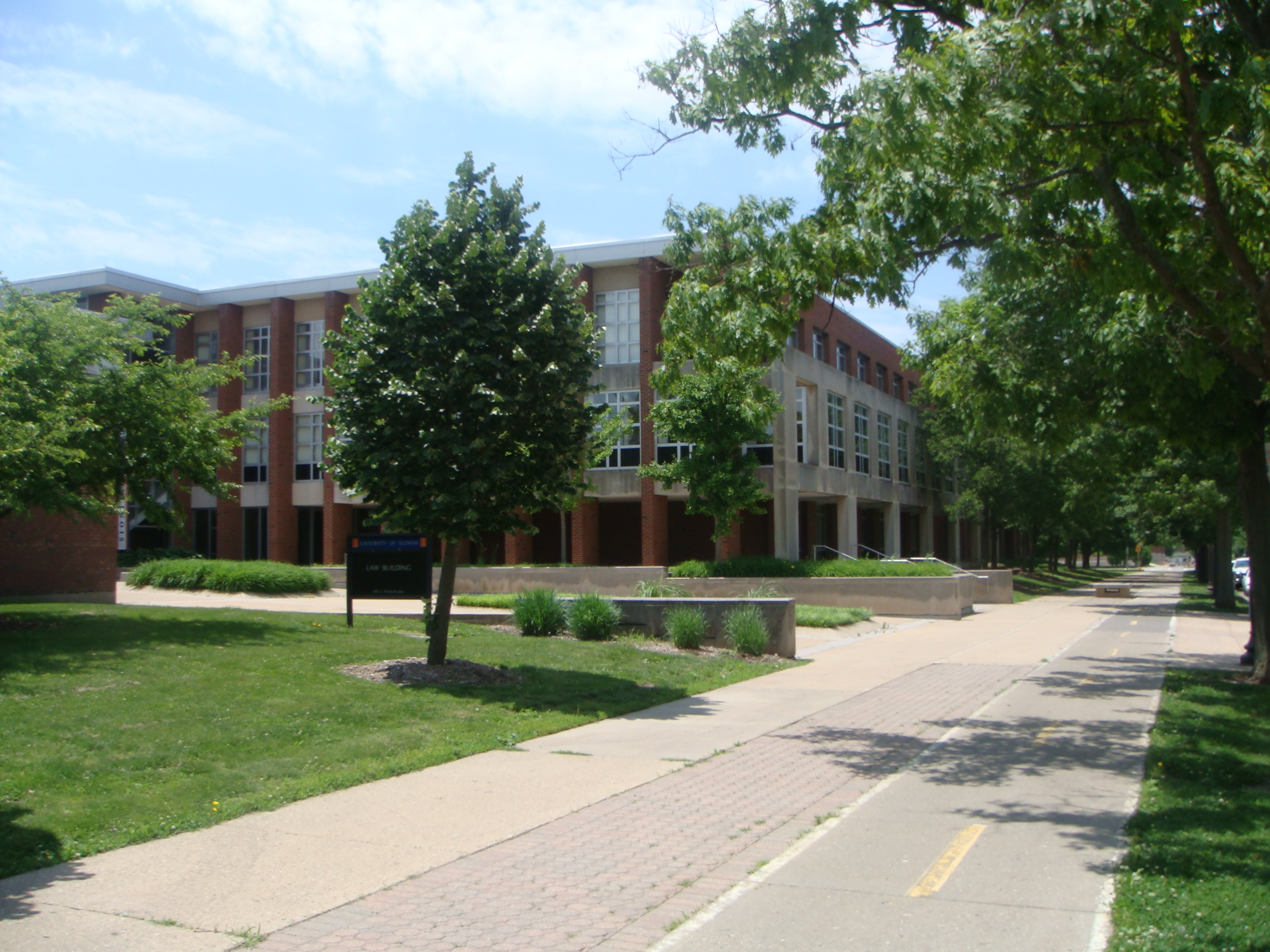
- Parent school: University of Illinois Urbana-Champaign
- Established: 1897; 129 years ago
- School type: Public law school
- Parent endowment: $3.46 billion
- Dean: Jamelle C. Sharpe
- Location: Champaign, Illinois, United States
- Enrollment: 519 (fall 2023)
- Faculty: 137 (fall 2022)
- USNWR ranking: 46th (tie) (2026)
- Bar pass rate: 93.56% (2024; first-time takers)
- Website: law.illinois.edu
- ABA profile: Standard 509 Report

The University of Illinois College of Law at Urbana-Champaign is the law school of the University of Illinois Urbana-Champaign, a public land-grant research university in Champaign and Urbana, Illinois. It was established in 1897 and offers the Juris Doctor, Master of Laws, and Doctor of Juridical Science degrees. The law school is located on the south end of the main University of Illinois campus in Champaign, near Memorial Stadium and the State Farm Center.

== History ==
The University of Illinois College of Law at Urbana-Champaign was founded in 1897 and is a charter member of the Association of American Law Schools. The law honor society known as the Order of the Coif was founded at Illinois Law in 1902.

On September 11, 2011, The News-Gazette reported that the law school posted inaccurate information on its website about the LSAT scores and GPAs of its incoming first-year law students. Two months later, the law school announced that a report commissioned from Jones Day and Duff & Phelps had found admission data for six of the seven previous years to have been manipulated by the Assistant Dean of Admissions Paul Pless, that Pless had acted alone and would no longer work for the College.

== Admissions ==
For the class entering in 2023, the law school accepted 43.69% of applicants, with 21.57% of those accepted enrolling. The median enrollee had a 165 LSAT score and 3.75 undergraduate GPA.

== Academics ==
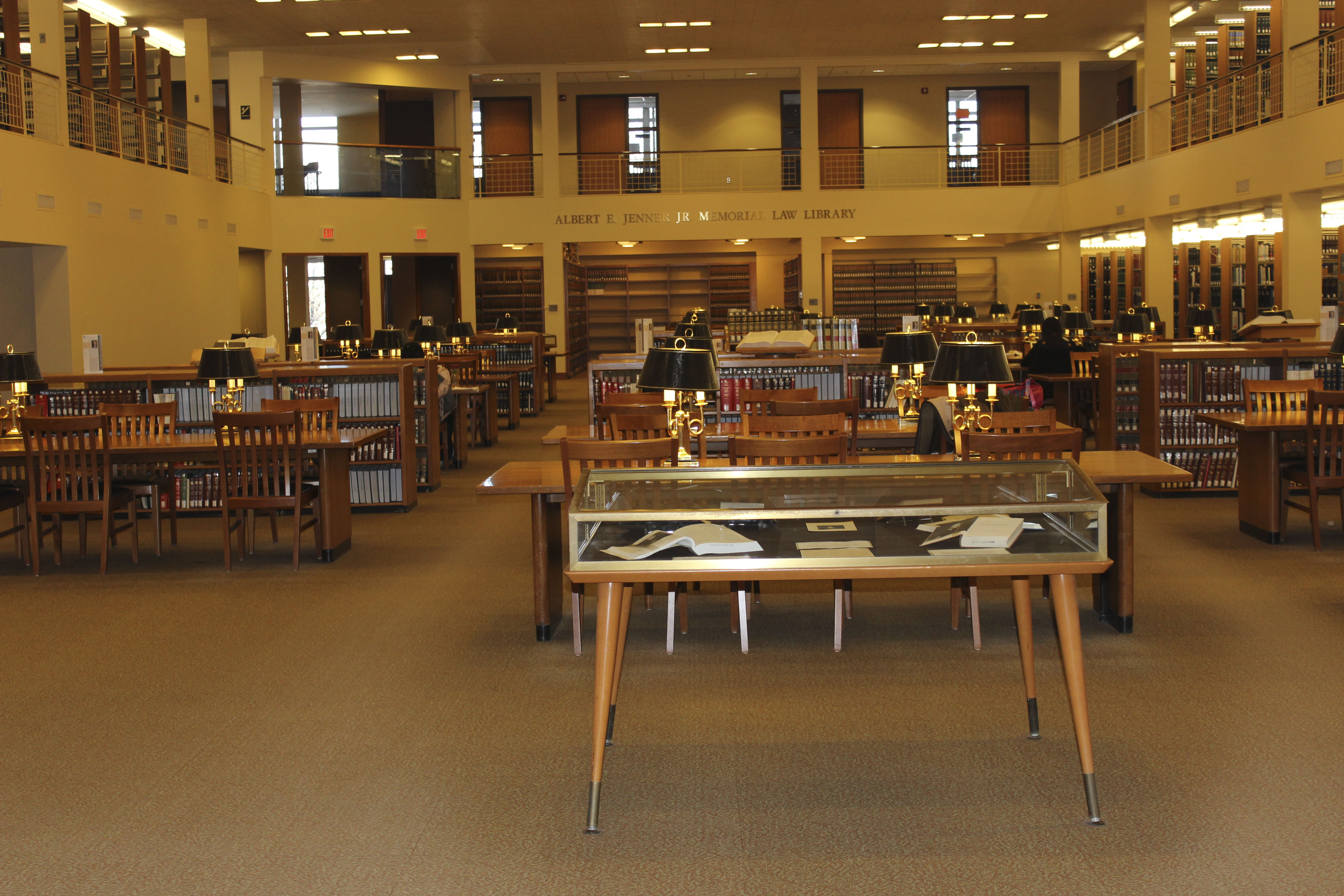
Albert E. Jenner Jr. Memorial Law Library

The law school offers the Juris Doctor (J.D.), the professional degree in law, as well as the Master of Laws (LL.M) and Doctor of Juridical Science (J.S.D.), academic graduate degrees in law.

The Albert E. Jenner, Jr. Memorial Library is the college's law library.

The flagship law review is the University of Illinois Law Review; the law school also publishes two specialized law journals, the Elder Law Journal and the Journal of Law, Technology & Policy. The law school is also the home institution for the Comparative Labor Law and Policy Journal, and for Law and Philosophy.

== Employment ==
According to the law school's official 2016 ABA-required disclosures, 78.92% of the Class of 2016 obtained full-time, long-term, JD-required employment 10 months after graduation. This was then the 19th highest out of all law schools in the United States. Law School Transparency under-employment score is 10.8%, indicating the percentage of the Class of 2016 unemployed, pursuing an additional degree, or working in a non-professional, short-term, or part-time job 10 months after graduation.

== Rankings and reputation ==
In the 2026 U.S. News & World Report ranking, the college was ranked 46th in the country. In 2025, Above the Law ranked the college 19th in the nation. In 1957, the Chicago Sunday Tribune released the first modern rankings of law schools, and included Illinois among the top 10 law schools in America.

== Notable alumni ==
Notable alumni include Albert E. Jenner Jr., name partner at the law firm Jenner & Block; Annette Lu, Vice President of the Republic of China from 2000 to 2008; and Philip McConnaughay, dean of Peking University School of Transnational Law and former dean of Penn State Dickinson Law.
