= Case Western Reserve University School of Law =

Private law school in Cleveland, Ohio, US

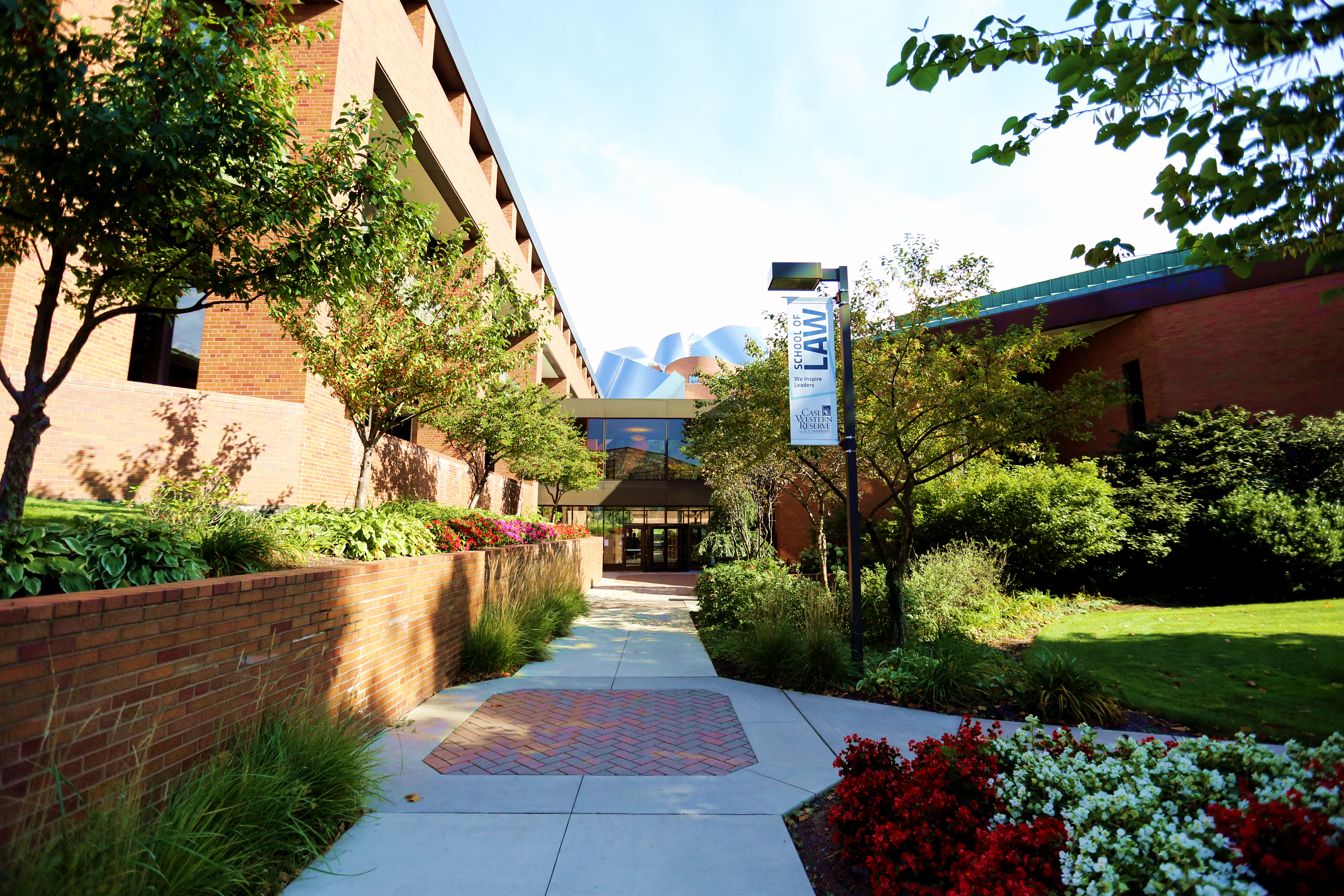
- Established: 1892
- School type: Private
- Dean: Paul Rose
- Location: Cleveland, Ohio, U.S.
- Enrollment: 422
- Faculty: 68 full-time
- USNWR ranking: 100th (tie) (2026)
- Bar pass rate: 86.73% (2022 first time takers)
- Website: www.law.case.edu

Case Western Reserve University School of Law is the law school of Case Western Reserve University in Cleveland, Ohio. It was one of the first schools accredited by the American Bar Association. It is a member of the Association of American Law Schools (AALS). It was initially named for Franklin Thomas Backus, a justice of the Ohio Supreme Court, whose widow donated $50,000 to found the school in 1892.

According to Case Western Reserve's official 2018 ABA-required disclosures, 65.9% of the Class of 2018 obtained full-time, long-term, bar passage-required employment nine months after graduation, excluding solo-practitioners, ranking 114th out of 200 ABA-approved law schools.

== History ==
Case Western University was formed in a merger of Western Reserve University and the Case School of Applied Science.

== Academics ==
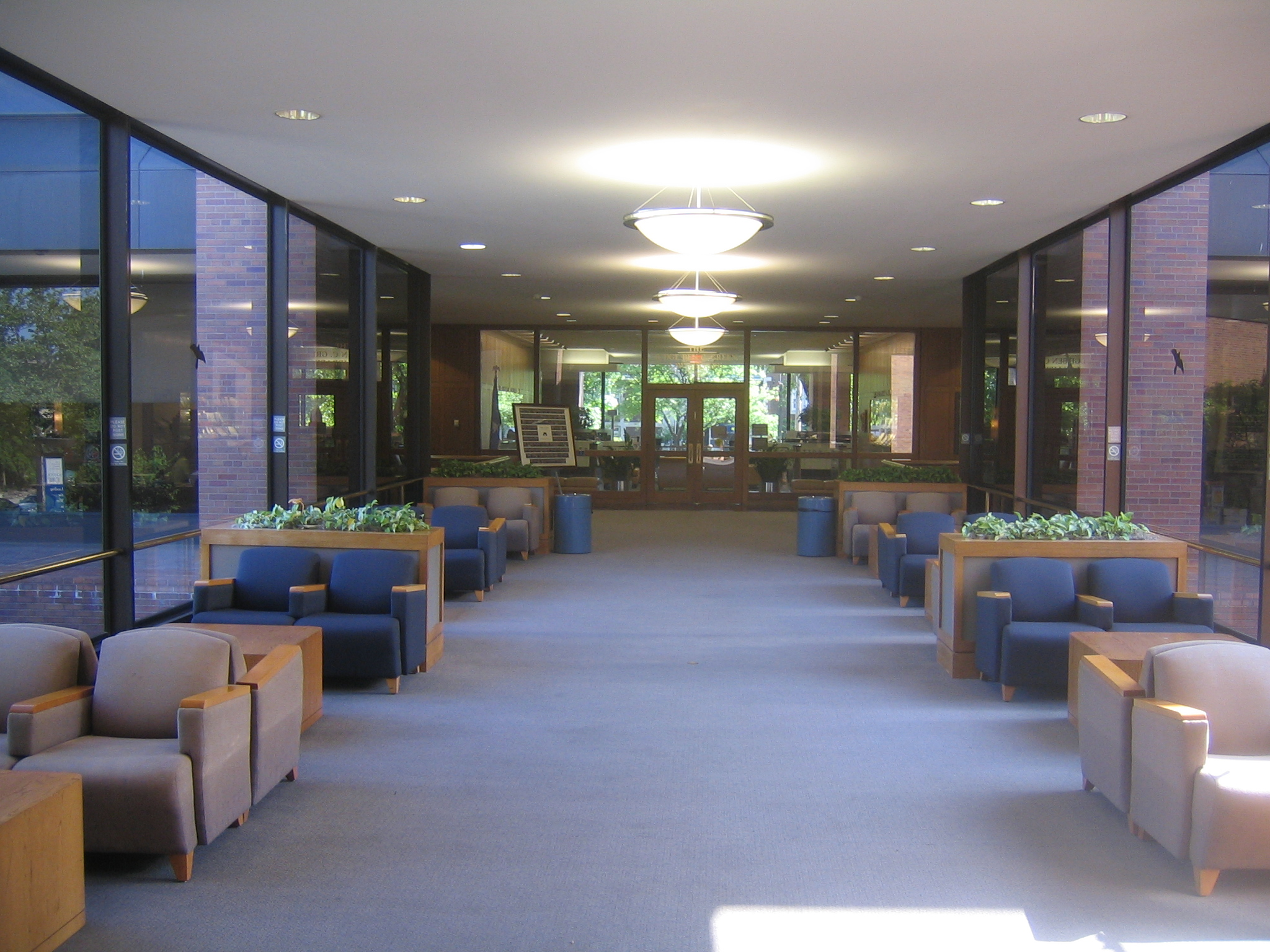
Gund Hall

The student-faculty ratio is 6.8:1. In August 2013, by a near-unanimous vote, the faculty adopted a new curriculum to reflect changes in the legal profession. The model is designed to blend practice, theory, and professionalism in all three years of law school. Students begin working with clients in the first year of law school. Writing and skills-oriented courses track course content to the school's substantive-law courses to blend theory and practice. Students also learn transactional drafting, financial literacy, and statutory and regulatory analysis during their first year.

During the second year of law school, students specialize and continue to build on the skills they learned during their first year. The law school's concentrations include health care law, international law, national security law, and law, technology, and the arts.

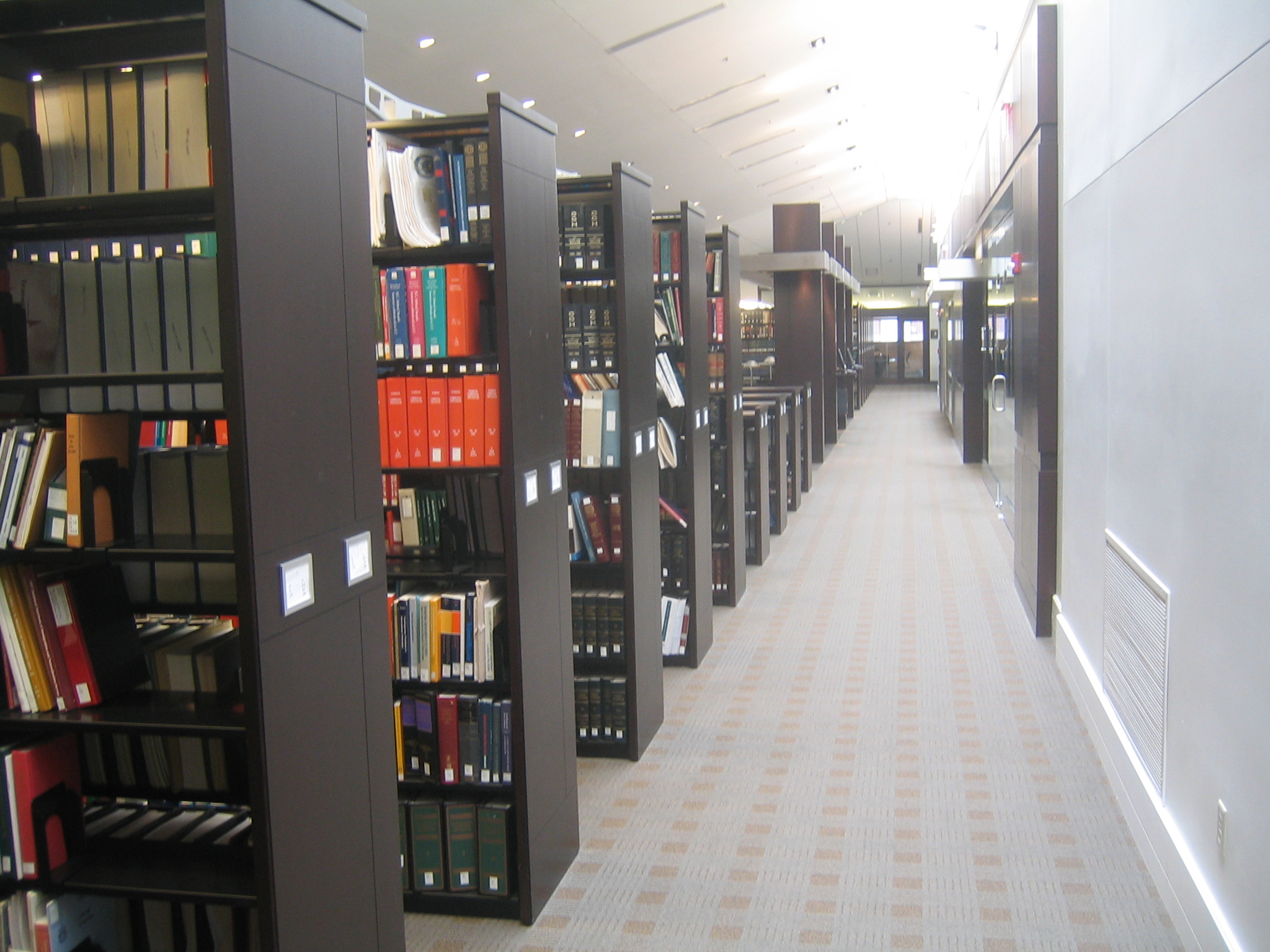
Law library

Beginning in 2016, a capstone semester became a hallmark of the third year. All students practice law full-time by working on cases through the Milton A. Kramer Law Clinic Center at the law school or through an externship. Students may do externships in the U.S. or abroad. A select number of students may competitively apply to spend their third year in Europe, completing a foreign LLM degree in addition to their Case JD, at no additional cost.

Students learn leadership through courses developed by faculty at Case Western's Weatherhead School of Management, and students graduate with e-portfolios of their work to share with employers.

=== Admissions ===
For the class entering in 2022, the school accepted 39.18% of applicants and, from those accepted, 29.08% enrolled, with enrolled students having an average 160 LSAT score and 3.66 average undergraduate GPA.

=== Academic centers ===
- Frederick K. Cox International Law Center
- Center for Law, Technology and the Arts
- The Law-Medicine Center
- Center for Business Law and Regulation
- Canada-US Law Institute
- Coleman P. Burke Center for Environmental Law

=== Journals ===
- Case Western Reserve Law Review
- Canada-US Law Journal
- Health Matrix: Journal of Law-Medicine
- Case Western Reserve Journal of Law, Technology & the Internet
- Case Western Reserve Journal of International Law

== Costs ==
The total cost of attendance (indicating the cost of tuition, fees, and living expenses) at Case Western Reserve for the 2022-2023 academic year was $85,792. Case Western Reserve's tuition and fees on average increase 3.03% annually. The Law School Transparency estimated debt-financed cost of attendance for three years is $320,718, while 47.8% of students received an annual discount greater than or equal to $40,000.

== Employment ==
According to Case Western Reserve's official 2018 ABA-required disclosures, 65.9% of the Class of 2018 obtained full-time, long-term, bar passage-required employment nine months after graduation, excluding solo-practitioners. The school ranked 114th out of 200 ABA-approved law schools in terms of the percentage of 2018 graduates with non-school-funded, full-time, long-term, bar passage required jobs nine months after graduation.

For 2021, Case Western Reserve's Law School Transparency under-employment score was 15%, indicating the percentage of the Class of 2021 unemployed, pursuing an additional degree, or working in a non-professional, short-term, or part-time job nine months after graduation. 93.4% of the Class of 2021 was employed in some capacity including non-professional, part-time, and short-term employment, while 0.7% were pursuing graduate degrees, and 5.9% were unemployed nine months after graduation. The most graduates, 23.5%, were employed in public service.

Ohio was the primary employment destination for 2021 Case Western Reserve graduates, with 46.1% of employed graduates working in the state. The next two most popular locations for Case Western graduates to accept employment were nine graduates in Washington, D.C., and nine in New York. In addition, two graduates from the class of 2021 accepted positions abroad.

== Rankings ==
The school was ranked tied for No.100 out of 197 schools by U.S. News & World Report in its 2026 law school rankings. In addition to its JD curriculum, the law school offers LLM and SJD degrees to foreign-trained lawyers. It also offers an Executive Master of Arts in Financial Integrity and a Masters in Patent Practice.

== Notable faculty ==
- Jonathan H. Adler – contributing editor to National Review Online and a regular contributor to The Volokh Conspiracy
- Peter Junger – computer law professor and Internet activist; professor at the law school 1970–2001
- Henry T. King Jr. – a U.S. prosecutor at the Nuremberg Trials in 1946–47. From the mid-1980s until his death in 2009 he was a professor at the law school. David M. Crane described King as "the George Washington of modern international law".
- Charles Korsmo – former child actor turned lawyer and law professor.
- Michael Scharf – A recognized international expert on international criminal law and author of Enemy of the State: The Trial and Execution of Saddam Hussein; co-dean of the law school; director of the Frederick K. Cox International Law Center

== Notable alumni ==
Among Case Western alumni are prominent elected officials, particularly from the State of Ohio. Examples of such include former Ohio State Treasurer Josh Mandel, former Ohio Attorneys General Marc Dann, Lee Fisher, and Jim Petro, and former U.S. Representatives Stephanie Tubbs Jones and Ron Klein.

Members of the bench who are Case Western alumni include Kathleen M. O'Malley a former member of the United States Court of Appeals for the Federal Circuit, and John J. McConnell, Jr. of the United States District Court for the District of Rhode Island. Both were appointed by President Barack Obama. Associate Justice John Hessin Clarke of the United States Supreme Court (1916–1922) was educated when the school was known as Western Reserve College. Associate Justice Jeffrey Hjelm of the Maine Supreme Judicial Court is also an alumnus.

Another prominent alumnus is William Daroff – chief executive officer at the Conference of Presidents of Major American Jewish Organizations and former member of the U.S. Commission for the Preservation of America's Heritage Abroad.

Internationally, François-Philippe Champagne, the current Minister of Finance and National Revenue of Canada, is also a Case Western alumnus.

Other Case alumni are involved in the fields of government, business, academia, and the judiciary.

== In popular culture ==
- In 2010, the show The Deep End on ABC features a main character, Addy Fisher, who graduated from CWRU School of Law.
