= List of first minority male lawyers and judges in Florida =

This is a list of the first minority male lawyer(s) and judge(s) in Florida. It includes the year in which the men were admitted to practice law (in parentheses). Also included are other distinctions such as the first minority men in their state to graduate from law school or become a political figure.

== Firsts in Florida's history ==
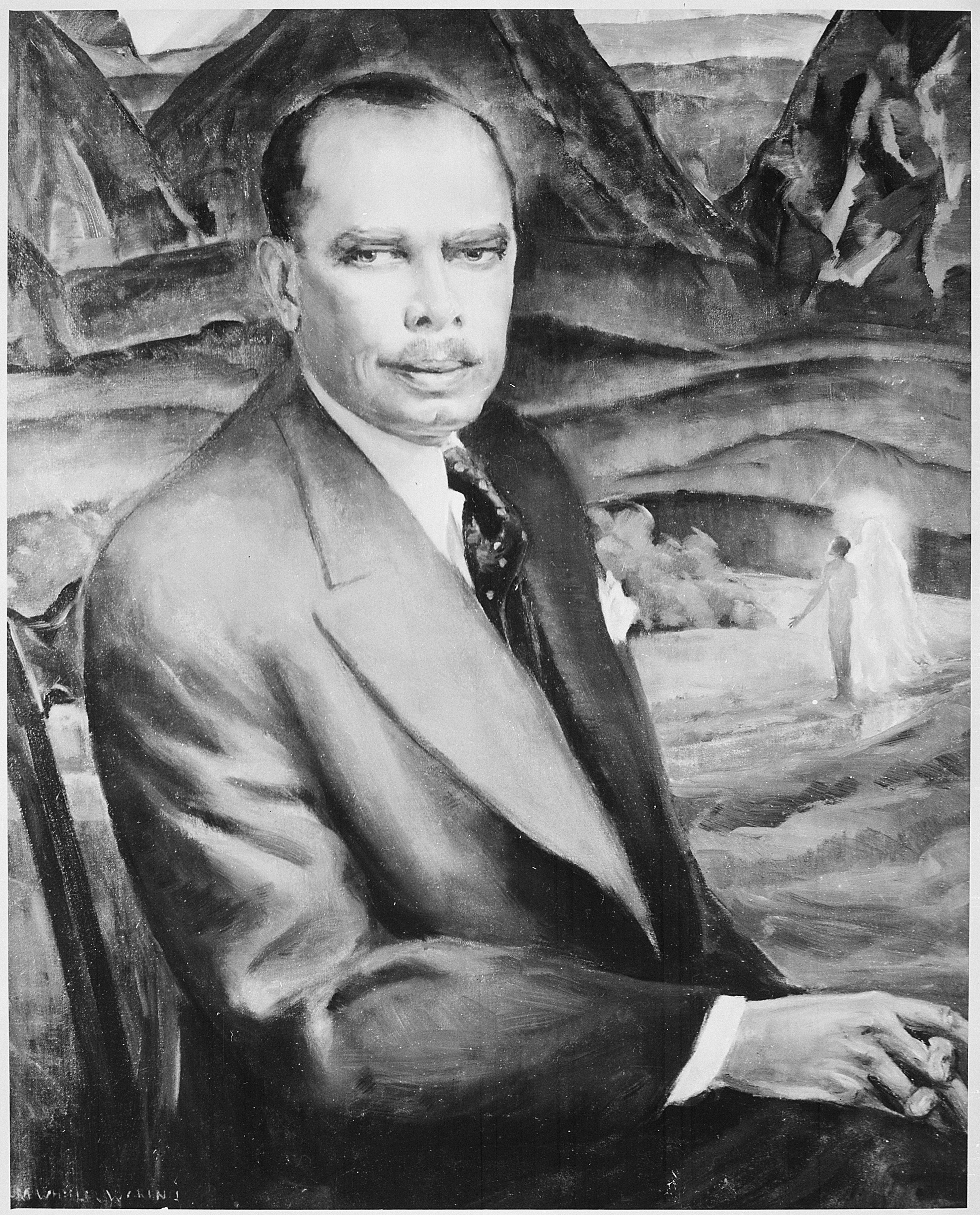
James Weldon Johnson: First African American male lawyer in Florida after the Reconstruction Era (1897)

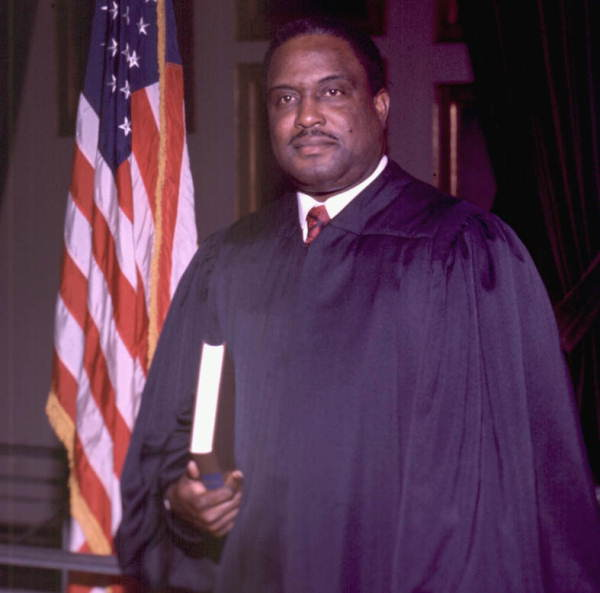
Joseph W. Hatchett: First African American male Justice of the Florida Supreme Court (1975)

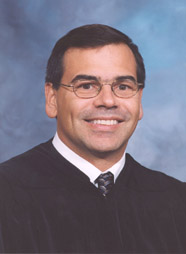
Raoul G Cantero III: First Hispanic American male Justice of the Florida Supreme Court (2002)

=== Law degree ===
- First African American male law graduate: W. George Allen in 1962

=== Lawyers ===
- First Jewish American male: David Levy Yulee (1832)
- First African American male: Harvey S. Harmon (1869)
- First African American male (licensed): Matthew M. Lewey
- First African American male (after Reconstruction Era): James Weldon Johnson (1897)
- First Italian American male: Anthony J. DiMedio (1925)
- First Native American males to work directly with the Governor’s Office of Florida: John Chaves and Osley B. Saunooke (c. 1974)
- First openly gay male: Robert Eimers (1976)
- First undocumented male: Jose Godinez-Samperio (2014)

=== State judges ===
- First African American male elected: James Dean (1884) in 1888
- First Jewish American male (circuit court): Harry N. Sandler in 1933
- First African American male (municipal court): Lawson E. Thomas (1923) in 1950
- First Cuban American male: Carlos Benito Fernandez in 1961
- First Chinese American male: Dominic Koo in 1972
- First blind male: Louis Corbin in 1972
- First African American male (Florida Supreme Court): Joseph W. Hatchett (1959) in 1975
- First Hispanic American male (Industrial Claims Court): Mario P. Goderich (1969) in 1975
- First Jewish American male (Florida Supreme Court; justice and chief justice): Arthur J. England, Jr. (1961) in 1975 and 1978 respectively
- First Hispanic American male (Seventeenth Judicial Circuit): Jose Alejandro Gonzalez Jr. (1957)
- First African American male (Eleventh Judicial Circuit Court): Wilkie D. Ferguson (c. 1960s) in 1977
- First Hispanic American male (Eleventh Judicial Circuit Court): Mario P. Goderich in 1978
- First African American male (Fourth Judicial Circuit): Henry Lee Adams Jr. (1969) in 1979
- First African American male (Third District Court of Appeal): Wilkie D. Ferguson (c. 1960s) in 1980
- First Hispanic American male (Third Judicial Circuit Court): Mario P. Goderich in 1980
- First African American male (Seventh Judicial Circuit): Hubert Grimes in 1988
- First African American male (Chief Justice; Florida Supreme Court): Leander J. Shaw Jr. (1952) in 1990
- First openly gay male: Rand Hoch in 1992
- First Muslim American male (appointed judge): A.B. Majeed in 1993
- First African American male (Twelfth Judicial Circuit): Charles Williams in 1998
- First Haitian American male: Fred Seraphin in 2001
- First Korean American male: Sonny Im (1991) in 2002
- First Hispanic American male (Florida Supreme Court): Raoul G. Cantero III (1985) in 2002
- First African American male (Eighteenth Judicial Circuit): James E.C. Perry in 2003
- First Hispanic American male (Seventh Judicial Circuit): Raul A. Zambrano in 2005
- First Hispanic American male (U.S. Court of Appeals for the Eleventh Circuit): Adalberto Jordan (1987) in 2012
- First Muslim American male (elected judge): Christopher Benjamin in 2025

=== Federal judges ===
- First African American male (Northern District Court of Florida): Stephan P. Mickle in 1970
- First Hispanic American male (U.S. District Court for the Southern District of Florida): Jose Alejandro Gonzalez Jr. (1957) in 1978
- First openly gay African American male (U.S. District Court for the Southern District of Florida): Darrin P. Gayles (1993) in 2014
- First openly gay male (U.S. District Court for the Middle District of Florida): Mac McCoy in 2015
- First South Asian American male (U.S. District Court for the Southern District of Florida): Anuraag Singhal (1989) in 2019

=== Attorney General of Florida ===
- First Jewish American male: Robert Shevin in 1971

=== Assistant Attorney General of Florida ===
- First African American male: Charles F. Wilson in 1963

=== United States Attorney ===
- First Cuban American male (Southern District of Florida): Roberto Martinez
- First Haitian American male (Southern District of Florida): Markenzy Lapointe in 2023

=== Assistant United States Attorney ===
- First African American male: Joseph W. Hatchett (1959) in 1966

=== State Attorney ===
- First Hispanic American male: E.J. Salcines

=== Assistant State Attorney ===
- First African American male (Second Judicial Circuit): Roosevelt Randolph
- First African American male (Chief Assistant State Attorney; Fourth Judicial Circuit): Brian J. Davis (1980) in 1994

=== Public Defender ===
- First Hispanic American male elected: Carlos J. Martinez in 2008

=== Assistant Public Defender ===
- First African American male: Delano Stewart in 1966

=== Florida Bar Association ===
- First African American male admitted (post-Reconstruction Era): James Weldon Johnson (1897)
- First Jewish American male president: Burton Young in 1970
- First Hispanic American male (Cuban descent) president: Stephen Zack in 1989
- First Cuban-born male president: Frank Angones in 2007
- First African American male president: Eugene K. Pettis in 2013

== Firsts in local history ==
- Charles Wilson: First African-American male in Tampa Bay appointed to the Eleventh Circuit of Florida
- Elijah Smiley: First African American male to serve as the Chief Judge of the Fourteenth Judicial Circuit in Florida (2015) [Bay, Calhoun, Gulf, Holmes, Jackson and Washington Counties, Florida]
- James E.C. Perry: First African American male to serve on the Eighteenth Judicial Circuit in Florida (2003) [Brevard and Seminole Counties, Florida]
- Hubert Grimes: First African American male to serve on the Seventh Judicial Circuit in Florida (1988) [Flagler, Putnam, St. John's and Volusia Counties, Florida]
- Stephen Everett: First African American male to serve on the Second Judicial Circuit in Florida (2019) [Franklin, Gadsden, Jefferson, Leon, Liberty and Wakulla Counties, Florida]
- Stephan P. Mickle (1970): First African American male judge in Alachua County, Florida. He later became the first African American district judge of the Northern District of Florida.
- Theodore R. Bowers (1962): First African American lawyer in Bay County, Florida
- A.B. Majeed: First Muslim American male judge in Brevard County, Florida (1993)
- Jose Alejandro Gonzalez Jr. (1957): First Hispanic American male to serve on the Broward Circuit Court (1964)
- Thomas J. "T.J." Reddick Jr.: First African American male lawyer in Broward County, Florida. He later became the first African American male to serve as a circuit court judge in Broward County, Florida
- Zebedee Wright: First African American male appointed as a County Court Judge in Broward County, Florida (1982)
- Robert Lee: First openly LGBT male judge in Broward County, Florida (1997)
- Anuraag Singhal (1989): First South Asian American male judge in Broward County, Florida (2011)
- Harold F. Pryor: First African American male to serve as the Broward State Attorney (2020)
- Earl Hall: First African American male to serve as the Lauderhill City Attorney, Broward County, Florida
- Abraham Bellamy (1822): First male lawyer to settle in Jacksonville, Duval County, Florida
- Joseph E. Lee (1873): First African American male lawyer in Jacksonville, Duval County, Florida
- Francis M. Robles (c. 1890): First Hispanic American male lawyer in Hillsborough County, Florida. He would later become a judge.
- M. Henry Cohen (1894) and Samuel Borchardt (1895): First Jewish American male lawyers in Hillsborough County, Florida
- Peter W. Bryant (c. 1898): First African American male lawyer in Hillsborough County, Florida
- George Edgecomb: First African American male judge in Hillsborough County, Florida
- Ignatio C. "Nelson" Spoto: First Italian American male judge in Hillsborough County, Florida (1949)
- Martin Caraballo: First Latino American male to serve as the President of the Hillsborough County Bar Association (1919)
- Lanse Scriven: First African American male to serve as the President of the Hillsborough County Bar Association. He is also the first African American member of the Florida Bar Board of Governors from Hillsborough County.
- Ted Taylor: First African American male lawyer in Plant City, Hillsborough County, Florida
- William Castagna: First Italian American male to serve as a federal judge in Tampa, Hillsborough County, Florida
- Warren Dawson: First African American male to serve as the Assistant City Attorney of Tampa, Hillsborough County, Florida
- Casimiro Hernandez: First Latino American male to serve as the judge of the Ybor City Justice of the Peace Court
- Armstrong Purdee: First African American male lawyer in Jackson County, Florida
- James Durden: First African American male lawyer in Lake County, Florida
- Isaac Anderson, Jr.: First African American male judge in Lee County, Florida (1981)
- Augustus D. Aikens: First African American male judge in Leon County, Florida
- Remus Allen: First African American male to serve as the Assistant Public Defender of Leon County, Florida
- Layon Robinson: First African American male lawyer in Manatee County, Florida
- Willie E. Gary: First African American male lawyer in Martin County, Florida
- Lawson E. Thomas (1923): First African American male judge in Miami, Florida (1950) [Miami-Dade County, Florida]
- Calvin Mapp: First African American male county court judge in Miami-Dade County, Florida
- Carlos Benito Fernandez: First Hispanic American male lawyer and judge (1961) in Miami, Miami-Dade County, Florida
- Dominic Koo: First Chinese American male judge in Miami, Miami-Dade County, Florida (1972)
- Wilkie D. Ferguson (c. 1960s): First African American male to serve on the Dade County Circuit Court (1977)
- Fred Seraphin: First Haitian American male judge in Miami-Dade County, Florida (2001)
- Frank Angones: First Cuban-born male to serve as the president of the Miami-Dade County Bar Association, Florida
- Christopher Benjamin: First Muslim American male judge in Miami-Dade County, Florida (2025)
- James Dean (1884): First African American male elected as a county court judge in Monroe County, Florida (1888)
- James C. Collier (c. 1950): First African American male lawyer in Orlando, Orange County, Florida
- Emerson R. Thompson Jr.: First African American male judge in Orange County, Florida (1976)
- Mel Martínez (1973): First Hispanic American male lawyer in Orlando, Orange County, Florida
- Jose Rodriguez: First Hispanic American male to serve as a Judge of the Orange-Osceola Judicial Circuit (1987)
- William Meredith "Bill" Holland Sr.: First African American male lawyer in West Palm Beach, Palm Beach County, Florida
- Joseph Lesser (1927): First Jewish American male lawyer in Palm Beach County, Florida
- Edward Rodgers: First African American prosecutor, judge, and chief judge in Palm Beach County, Florida
- Bradley Harper: First African American male elected as a Judge of the Palm Beach County Circuit Court (2016)
- Luis Delgado: First Hispanic American male elected as a Judge of the Palm Beach County Circuit Court (2016)
- James B. Sanderlin (1963): First African American male judge in Pinellas County, Florida
- Thomas E. Stringer, Sr.: First African American male to graduate from the Stetson University College of Law (1974) [Pinellas County, Florida]
- David Wilson III: First African American male lawyer in Winter Haven, Florida [Polk County, Florida]
- Charles P. Benton (1950): First African American male lawyer in Fort Pierce, St. Lucie County, Florida
- Ralph Flowers: First African American male judge in St. Lucie County, Florida
- Emerson R. Thompson Jr.: First African American male to serve as a Judge of the Fifth District Court of Appeal in Daytona Beach, Florida (1993) [Volusia County, Florida]

== See also ==
- List of first minority male lawyers and judges in the United States

== Other topics of interest ==
- List of first women lawyers and judges in the United States
- List of first women lawyers and judges in Florida
