= Immaculata-LaSalle High School =

Private, coeducational school in Coconut Grove, Miami, Florida, United States

Immaculata-La Salle High School

Location
- 3601 South Miami Avenue; Coconut Grove, Miami, (Miami-Dade County), Florida 33133; United States; 25°44′36″N 80°12′52″W

Information
- Type: Private, Coeducational
- Motto: Virtus et Scientia Signum Fidei (Virtue. Knowledge. Faith.)
- Religious affiliation: Catholic
- Established: 1958
- Oversight: Salesian Sisters of St. John Bosco
- Superintendent: Archdiocese of Miami, Dept. Of Schools
- Principal: Sr. Kim Keraitis, FMA
- Grades: 9–12
- Gender: Coed
- Colors: Green and Gold
- Mascot: Royal Lion
- Team name: Royal Lions
- Accreditation: Cognia – NCA CASI /NWAC/ SACS CASI
- Publication: Inklings Student Literary Magazine
- Newspaper: The Royal Courier
- Yearbook: Signum
- School fees: $2,600 Registration Fee $800 credit applied to total tuition and fees
- Tuition: $17,040 (2025-2026) includes all Technology, books, breakfast and lunch programs.
- Website: http://www.ilsroyals.com

Immaculata-La Salle High School is a private, Catholic high school in the Coconut Grove neighborhood of Miami, Florida. It is part of the Archdiocese of Miami and is located between Mercy Hospital and Vizcaya on South Bayshore Drive.

The school was officially founded as Immaculata Academy, a Catholic college preparatory school for girls, on September 1, 1958. The Sisters of St. Joseph Congregation of St. Augustine FL were the school's founding religious order. The school is now run by the Salesian Sisters of Don Bosco.

== History of the school ==
=== Immaculata Academy ===
On November 5, 1945, Bishop Joseph P. Hurley of the Diocese of St. Augustine purchased 130 of the original 160 acres (0.65 km^{2}): 68 acres (280,000 m^{2}) on the Bayside and 61 acres (250,000 m^{2}) opposite in the pineland of James Deering's Vizcaya estate, from Deering's heirs.

In 1950, Mercy Hospital was founded next to the property by the Sisters of St. Joseph Congregation of St. Augustine to serve the booming post-World War II population.

On August 9, 1958 Sister Mary Damian, SSJ – Immaculata Academy community superior – and Sister Marie de Lourdes Ortagus, SSJ – Immaculata Academy principal – arrived at Mercy Hospital. Immaculata Academy was built adjacent to Mercy Hospital facing the shores of Biscayne Bay.

A few days later on August 13, 1958, the Roman Catholic Diocese of Miami was created, including 16 southeastern Florida counties, 51 parishes, 81 priests and 185,000 Catholics. The rest of the counties remained part of the Diocese of St. Augustine. On August 15, Sisters Mary Monica, St. George, and Mary Martha, SSJ arrived at Mercy Hospital, where they shared five rooms within the hospital convent.

Between August 26 and 28, the first 138 Immaculata Academy students registered for 10th through 12th grades at Mercy Hospital. On August 31, Rev. Thomas Anglim – Immaculata Academy president – conducted the first faculty meeting. Four lay teachers completed the faculty. The school uniform chosen by the faculty was a skirt and blouse of a beige drip-dry material, saddle oxfords, along with a dark brown cardigan for winter months.

On September 1, Immaculata Academy was co-founded by Archbishop Joseph P. Hurley of the Diocese of St. Augustine and Rev. Mother Anna Maria, SSJ. The school name "Immaculata" was chosen to honor the Blessed Virgin Mary under the title of her Immaculate Conception. The school opened in the middle of the modern American civil rights movement and during the emerging of the modern feminist movement.

Ivan Meštrović’s Pieta notable sculpture arrived in Miami the same day and was unceremoniously installed facing Biscayne Bay in front of the Immaculata classroom building. When the Diocese of Miami was carved out of the Diocese of St. Augustine, the monument to modern martyrs of Communism, as envisioned and planned by Archbishop Hurley, was never completed.

On September 2, 1958, Immaculata Academy opened its doors for the first time with 153 students. Only three classrooms were ready. While the rest of the school was still under construction, classes were held on half-day session. Because the cafetorium was not completed, students had to use a large classroom on the first floor for cold lunches. On September 15, full-day classes began. On November 28, the school held its first dance – the Sophomore Harvest Hop, in the newly completed cafetorium, and in December the first Christmas Formal dance took place there.

On January 28, 1959, Rev. Thomas L. McDermott became the second Immaculata Academy president. On March 14, Immaculata religious community moved into their school convent. On May 1, the first student members were inducted into the Immaculata Chapter of the National Honor Society. On June 4, Immaculata's first graduation class of 26 students received diplomas at the Church of the Little Flower (St. Theresa) in Coral Gables, Florida. On August 15, Sister Marie de Lourdes Ortagus, SSJ was appointed Immaculata convent superior, replacing Sister Mary Damian, SSJ.

On September 8, Immaculata Academy opened for its second school year with 285 pupils, including St. Theresa school's ninth graders. 1959 was the first year ninth grade students attended the school. On June 3, 1960, Immaculata Academy graduated 49 seniors from Sts. Peter and Paul Church in Miami. Sources: Journal of Sister Mary Alberta Stark, SSJ and 1961 Immaculata Academy Signum Yearbook

On September 6, 1960, Immaculata Academy's third school year opened with 440 pupils and ninth grade female students from feeder parishes Gesu Church - Miami, Church of the Little Flower (St. Theresa) - Coral Gables, Sts. Peter and Paul Church - Miami, St. Michael the Archangel Church - Miami, Church of the Epiphany - South Miami, St. Brendan's Church - Miami, Holy Rosary Church - Perrine, and St. Hugh's Church - Coconut Grove (Miami). Rev. Robert Reardon was appointed supervising principal.

On September 11, 1960, Hurricane Donna hit the school and convent with up to 128 miles (206 km)-an-hour winds and 11 to 13-foot (4.0 m) waves from Biscayne Bay. When the school was closed for cleanup, blue crabs were found on the second floor of the classroom building, where school books stored in open hallway lockers were damaged and then replaced. Source: Nancy Foye-Cox, ILS 1964 Classmate's oral history

On November 14, 1960, the Immaculata Academy student body marched en masse to Rickenbacker Causeway to greet U.S. President-elect John F. Kennedy, who was en route to a historical meeting with Vice President Richard Nixon on Key Biscayne. A Christmas pageant was presented by the school in December. The Christmas Formal dance was sponsored by the Immaculata Parent's Auxiliary. During the winter of 1960–1961, the first student Red Cross chapter was formed. Source: Journal of Sister Mary Alberta Stark, SSJ and 1961 Immaculata Academy Signum Yearbook

On February 14, 1961, the ILS Junior class sponsored "The Heart of Fashion" show. Sources: Journal of Sister Mary Alberta Stark, SSJ and the 1960–1964 Immaculata Academy "Signum" yearbooks and "Corona" student newspaper editions.

=== Christian Brothers (Brothers of the Christian Schools) ===
On April 30, 1651, Jean-Baptiste de La Salle (1651–1719) was born to a family of wealth in Reims, France. At age 27, La Salle was ordained a priest after renouncing his family's fortune. He received his doctorate in theology a few years later. La Salle founded the order in 1680 with the mission of teaching poor boys. Found literally in every part of the world, La Salle founded a teaching order known as the Brothers of the Christian Schools to instruct teachers and create schools for delinquent children. He also founded vocational and secondary schools, and implemented the use of modern languages, arts and sciences. La Salle dedicated his life to establishing and developing quality schools throughout France. After his death in 1719, he was canonized a saint of the Catholic Church by Pope Leo XIII.

To avoid persecution in France, 70 La Salle Christian Brothers were sent to Canada. On September 10, 1905, 11 Brothers arrived in Cuba and were well received by the Cuba's president and the Bishop of Havana. Immediately they opened two new schools in Havana. Within 56 years, they had opened 23 schools and one university in Cuba. Their schools were available to all children regardless of income, status or race.

In 1959, the Communist regime forced students to join the militia. On May 1, 1961, Cuban prime minister Fidel Castro decreed the nationalization of all 350 private schools. Churches were also closed, and all priests and religious, as well as the Christian Brothers, were expelled from Cuba.

During the first two years of the Cuban revolution, many Catholic students were sent to prison and were soon joined by many priests and Brothers. They were tortured on a daily basis at the infamous La Cabana prison. They agonized and prayed nightly as they heard students yell "Viva Cristo Rey" before being shot by a firing squad at the Paredon.

On May 25, 1961, 109 Brothers of the Christian Schools - Christian Brothers, arrived at Miami International Airport on a Pan American World Airways flight, which was chartered by the Scoppeta-Arca family. They came to the United States, because Cuban prime minister Fidel Castro closed all Catholic churches, convents, and schools, and expelled all priests and religious orders. Thousands of their former students, who had fled Cuba earlier, were there to greet them. A few days later, six former students (Eduardo R. Arellano de Cardenas, Jose M. Arellano de Cardenas, Bienvenido "Benny" Benach Costales, Oscar Bustill Guas, Nestor Machado Lopez-Munoz, and Eduardo Sanchez Rionda) visited the Brothers at the Everglades Hotel in downtown Miami and resolved to assist them in establishing another La Salle school in Miami.

These student co-founders of La Salle High School asked the community for help raising funds and gathering clothing for the Brothers. They met with Bishop Coleman Carroll and Rev. Bryan Walsh, who both agreed to fund a school for the Christian Brothers. The decision was prompt and swift; the school was built in less than six months on the same site as Immaculata Academy. The bishop arranged for the schools to share certain school facilities. Meanwhile, other Christian Brother schools in New York and Pennsylvania sent Brothers to set the curriculum and work with the Cuban Christian Brothers.

=== La Salle High School ===
La Salle High School is named for St. Jean Baptiste de La Salle - founder of the Brothers of the Christian Schools (the Christian Brothers) and universal patron of teachers. The Christian Brothers is the largest group of men in the Catholic Church devoted exclusively to teaching. In the United States, they mainly teach and administer elementary schools and high schools.

On June 3, 1961, 72 Immaculata Academy seniors received diplomas from Bishop Carroll at the Church of the Little Flower (St. Theresa) in Coral Gables.

On September 5, 1961, Immaculata Academy opened with 490 students and 20 faculty members (10 religious and 10 lay teachers). For the first time, the Immaculata student body had 6 African-American students. 1964 Classmate Antonia "Toni" Williams was the first African-American student to enroll at Immaculata Academy. This was nearly 10 years before Federal Judge E. Clyde Atkins ordered all Dade County schools to be racially integrated by September on January 22, 1970. Also, Cuban refugee girls soon become Immaculata classmates and were paired with Immaculata students to learn English. Basic Spanish was taught to all students over the school intercom. Source: 1964 ILS Classmate Toni Williams-Gary's oral history

Once again, the Sisters of St. Joseph welcomed diverse students to the school as had always been their tradition in America. Although the U.S. Supreme Court 1954 decision in Brown vs. Board of Education made segregated schools illegal, in 1964 only 2% of public schools nationwide were racially integrated.

On September 11, 1961, La Salle High School was officially founded by Bishop Coleman F. Carroll under the direction of the District of Cuba of the Brothers of the Christian Schools (the Christian Brothers). La Salle opened its doors for the first time in late September with 260 students (grades 7 through 12) with a faculty of 13 Christian Brothers. The majority of students were Cuban refugees. Two American brothers assisted the faculty, and Brother Benjamin Roque, FSC became La Salle's first principal.

Miami parishes served by Immaculata and La Salle were: Gesu, St. Michael the Archangel, Sts. Peter and Paul, and St. Dominic - Miami; Church of the Little Flower (St. Theresa) - Coral Gables; St. Hugh - Coconut Grove (Miami); Church of the Epiphany and St. Thomas the Apostle - South Miami; Our Lady of the “Holy Rosary” – Perrine; Sacred Heart - Homestead; St. Brendan and St. Timothy - West Miami; and St. Agnes – Key Biscayne.

On December 2, 1961, Cuban prime minister Fidel Castro announced he was a Communist. On December 17, the Immaculata Glee Club presented a Christmas concert – “The Gift,” based on Tchaikovsky's Nutcracker Ballet, under the direction of Sister Mary Josepha Butterfield, SSJ.

In the Spring of 1962, Immaculata and La Salle presented their first joint student production, the senior class play - “The Sound of Music.” In April, the Immaculata Chorus under the direction of Sister Butterfield, SSJ, presented a Spring Concert - “So Proudly We Sing.” The concert was recorded on a 33 1/3 LP record album and sold as a fundraiser.

On May 31, 1962 for the first time, 85 Immaculata and 30 La Salle seniors graduated together at Church of the Little Flower (St. Theresa) in Coral Gables. These seniors were La Salle's first graduates in America. Sources: Jose Arellano, 1961 La Salle classmate and school co-founder's oral history and 1961 and 1962 Signum student yearbooks and Corona student newspaper editions.

=== Immaculata-La Salle High School ===
In September 1962, La Salle High School was placed under the Christian Brothers of the Baltimore District, and Brother Patrick Ellis, FSC became the school's second principal. Along with Immaculata Academy, La Salle formed a co-institutional school, which shared facilities but not faculties – Immaculata-La Salle High School. Rev. Claude E. Brubaker was ILS' first supervising principal. On September 4 when Immaculata opened with 570 students and 25 teachers, there were three portable buildings that provided six extra classrooms. On September 29, 1962, the La Salle Royals football team played their first game at 3:45 PM at Central Stadium (now a part of Florida International University) against Florida Air Academy of Melbourne, Florida. The Air Academy won that game 6-0.

On June 2, 126 Immaculata and 58 La Salle seniors graduated from Church of the Little Flower (St. Theresa) in Coral Gables, Florida.

On September 3, 1963, ILS enrollment was 615.

On February 4, 1964, Bishop Caroll dedicated the new Immaculata-La Salle Science Building. On February 7 and 8, the 1964 Senior Class play - “The Peace Corps” was performed in the cafetorium.

On April 24, 1964, the ILS Junior/Senior Prom was held at the DuPont Plaza Hotel in downtown Miami -the first prom to be held off campus. On April 26, ILS Spring Band and Choral Concert was held. On May 31, Immaculata and La Salle seniors attended a Baccalaureate Mass at St. Hugh's Church in Coconut Grove. On June 1, 117 Immaculata seniors graduated with La Salle and Christopher Columbus High Schools at Miami Beach Auditorium. It is the last time Immaculata and La Salle seniors will wear separate class rings. These graduating seniors, most of whom were born in 1946, are the first of the post-war “Baby Boomer” generation to graduate from high school. Sources: 1962–1964 ILS Signum student yearbooks and Corona student newspaper editions and sports, concert, and theater programs.

In May 1966, students succeeded in having a traffic light installed on Bayshore Drive - a dangerous traffic intersection at the entrance to the school. This project was the 1966 Class gift to ILS. After attending many City of Miami Commission meetings, the traffic light was finally installed one week after their graduation. Source: Maria Restrepo Forte, ILS 1966 Classmate's oral history.

On May 29, 1966, 124 Immaculata seniors and 63 La Salle seniors attended a Baccalaureate Mass at Sts. Peter and Paul Church in Miami, and graduated with Christopher Columbus’ Seniors at Dade County Auditorium. The address to the graduates was given by Rt. Rev. Theodore E. McCrick - president of the Catholic University of Puerto Rico, and Bishop Coleman F. Carroll of Miami presented the Special Awards.

On May 24, 1972, the Pieta sculpture was removed from the Immaculata Academy seawall on Biscayne Bay to Our Lady of Mercy Catholic Cemetery to make room for the Shrine of Cuban patron Our Lady of Charity. The official reason given for moving the sculpture was “because salt air produced some green ‘cancers’ on the bronze sculpture." Source: "Four-ton bronze pieta finds new home" by Marilin A. Moore, MIAMI NEWS, March 8, 1983

In June, Sister Marie Therese Everard, SSJ departed ILS. Sister Everard was the last Sisters of St. Joseph religious to serve in the Immaculata-La Salle administration as dean of Student Affairs.

In January 1974, the Christian Brothers left Immaculata-La Salle High School.

In June 1981, Sister Elizabeth Worley, SSJ was the last Sisters of St. Joseph religious to leave Immaculata-La Salle High School when the Teresian Association took over school administration.

The last school yearbook to display the name Immaculata-La Salle was the 1981–1982 Signum yearbook.

=== Teresian Association ===
The Teresian Association is an international Catholic lay association of men and women whose objective is the human promotion of individuals and the transformation of unjust structures by means of an education and culture imparted from the platform of Christianity. Its members strive to live in the world “after the style of the first Christians” as its founder St. Pedro Poveda desired.

In 1911, St. Pedro Poveda opened a Pedagogical Academy in Gijón (Asturias) for all teachers and, concerned as he is with the promotion of women, whose importance and incidence in society he perceives, he also opens a Women's Academy for those ladies studying to become teachers. These constitute the beginning of what later on will become the Teresian Association. In 1924, Pope Pius XI approves the Teresian Association as an international Pious Union of The Faithful. Its aim is to invite men and women to work for a social and human transformation, in accordance with Gospel values, from the platform of their own professions, especially those related to the fields of education and culture.

Teresian Association members are involved in education and research, social work, family ministry, pastoral work, social programmes, and civil service. The Association is engaged in different educational, socio-cultural and humanitarian endeavours and is present in 30 countries, with thousands of members and collaborators.

During the 1982–1983 school year, the Teresian Association dropped “Immaculata” from the school's name. The Class of 1983–1984 were the last class to wear an Immaculata-La Salle High School class ring.

On March 7, 1983, the Pieta sculpture was moved from Our Lady of Mercy Catholic Cemetery to the Archdiocese of Miami Pastoral Center's Garden of Memories, where it remains.

In June 1985, the Salesian Order of St. John Bosco assumed administration of La Salle High School under the direction of Rev. Frank Wolfram, SDB, as principal Rosemary Kamke departed the school.

=== Salesian Sisters ===
The Salesian Sisters of Don Bosco, or Daughters of Mary Help of Christians, are the sister order of the Salesians of Don Bosco. They were founded by Saint Maria Mazzarello in 1872 to work alongside Saint Don Bosco in his teaching projects in Turin and continue to be a teaching order worldwide. On August 5, 1872 in Mornese, Alessandria, Italy, the first Daughters of Mary Help of Christians gathered with Don Bosco and Msgr. Joseph Sciandra, the Bishop of Acqui, to celebrate their admission to the novitiate and the first professions. On that day St. Mary Domenica Mazzarello was also elected the first superior and given the title of “vicar”.

A year later their first boarding school and primary school was recognized by the educational authorities of Castelletto d’Orba. On October 8, 1874, the Salesian Sisters were able to open their first house in Borgo San Martino. The work of the Salesians Sisters was not limited to a schoolroom as they participated in social justice works and teaching trades to young women and girls. St. Mary Mazzarello and her first companions were able to profess their perpetual vows, after studying with the Sisters of St Anne for their religious formation, on August 28, 1875 in the presence of Don Bosco.

After many years of revision, discussion and consultation, St. Don Bosco was able to give to the Daughters of Mary Help of Christians the first printed version of their Constitutions on the feast of the Immaculate Conception, December 8, 1878. In 1881, Mother Mazzarello took ill and died on May 14, at age 44. In her stead were left 26 houses and 166 Sisters. Mary Help of Christians saw to it that her Institute grew, and today the order numbers more than 15,000 members in 89 different countries, and on five continents.

=== Hurricane Andrew ===
On August 24, 1992 Hurricane Andrew hit South Florida, resulting in 15 deaths, more than 250,000 temporary homeless, and $20 billion in damages. An additional 25 lives were lost indirectly. Hardly any part of South Florida was unaffected and recovery took years. La Salle High School was no different. Both La Salle High School and La Ermita de la Caridad National Shrine awoke to four rather large cabin cruiser boats on several locations on the campus. Although still on summer vacation, many of the students from the class of 1993, 1994 and 1995 participated in an intense two-week cleanup. Without the help of these students the school simply could not have opened on time only two weeks later. Incredibly, even though the storm surge reached the schools second floor, the statue of Mary Help of Christians was untouched according to Jose M. Pazos class of 1995. This statue was located in front of the cafeteria courtyard right next to a 34 ft boat that had landed there during the storm. For months many of the students and parents raised money to repair the school. Many alumni also contributed assistance by way of political influence in order to assist in the cleanup particularly of the mountain of debris located behind the science building. The City of Miami was very gracious in donating the bulk waste machinery needed to clean up the debris. Thankfully under the direction of Father Patrick Angelucci, principal from 1991 -1995, the school was able to come back even stronger than before.

=== Restoring "Immaculata" to La Salle High School's name ===
In 2002, the first La Salle High School Alumni Association was formed. 1964 ILS classmate Armando Chapelli proposed to the La Salle High School Alumni Association to restore the name Immaculata to the school's name and to move the Pieta sculpture back to the campus.

On April 24, 2004, the La Salle High School Alumni Association inducted the following charter members into the school's Hall of Fame: 1964 ILS classmate Antonia “Toni” Williams-Gary and 1962 ILS classmates and La Salle student founders Eduardo R. Arellano de Cardenas, Jose M. Arellano de Cardenas, Bienvenido “Benny” Benach Costales, Oscar Bustill Guas, Nestor Machado Lopez-Munoz, and Eduardo Sanchez Rionda. Also inducted were former ILS faculty members Sister Mary Josepha Butterfield, SSJ, Sister Elizabeth Worley, SSJ, Brother Malachy Broderick, FSC, and Brother Antonio Ramon, FSC.

The 2005 hurricane season devastated the school's campus, which suffered extensive damage. The school cafetorium needed to be reconstructed. A tent was installed on the school property and used as a cafeteria until the reconstruction was completed. Recovery efforts were hastened by the assistance of students, faculty and alumni in the clean-up process.

On February 26, 2006, 1966 ILS classmates Marianne Carpentieri Donnell and Maria Restrepo Forte met with La Salle High School principal - Sister Patricia Roche, FMA to express their concerns and disappointment over the decision to drop "Immaculata" from the school's name. Sister Roche considered allowing the original school building to be named Immaculata Hall and proposed that a small garden area be turned over to Immaculata graduates as a memorial area for Immaculata. On April 29, Principal Roche issued a declaration naming the original school building Immaculata Hall during the 1966 Class reunion. Source: Nancy Foye-Cox - ILS 1964 Classmate's Oral History

In 2006 or 2007, 1966 ILS classmate Maria Restropo Forte joined the La Salle Alumni Association Board, and the Alumni Association subsequently changed its name to the Immaculata-La Salle High School Alumni Association. Summer of 2007 Gaston Arellano, son of Jose Maria Arellano, Founding member of the class of 1962 joined the Alumni Board of Directors.

On June 1, 2007, La Salle principal, Sr. Patricia Roche, officially solicited support from ILS alumni to restore the name "Immaculata" to La Salle High School in commemoration of the upcoming 50th anniversary of the founding of Immaculata Academy on September 1, 1958. On June 8, Miami Archbishop John C. Favalora sent a letter to Sister Roche granting her request to restore “Immaculata” to the school's name. 2007 marked the 45th anniversary of the founding of Immaculata-La Salle High School. 2006 marked the 45th anniversary of La Salle High School's founding in Miami, Florida. After nearly 25 years, the name Immaculata was officially restored to the school's name on October 20, 2007 during the school's 50th Anniversary celebration.

La Salle High School is served by the Miami Metrorail at the Vizcaya Station.

== Athletics ==
- Fall: Cheerleading(N/A), Cross Country(2A), Football(2A), Swimming(2A), Volleyball(2A)
- Winter: Basketball(3A), Soccer(2A)
- Spring: Baseball(3A), Softball(2A), Track & Field(2A), Tennis(2A), Lacrosse(3A)

== Notable alumni ==
- Carlos Álvarez - former mayor of Miami-Dade County.
- Frank Angones - head of the Florida Bar.
- Ariana Barouk - former Miss Cuba.
- Ana Mari Cauce - 33rd and current president of the University of Washington.
- Tomás Regalado - former mayor of Miami.
- Willy Chirino - musician
- Ana Quincoces - celebrity chef
- Francis Suarez - mayor of Miami
- Ada Pozo - former Miami-Dade County judge, co-host of CNBC's Money Court.
- Yeniffer Behrens - actor, producer, and writer.

== Nearby comparable schools ==
- St. Brendan High School
- Belen Jesuit Preparatory School
- Christopher Columbus High School
