= Judge Ferguson =

Judge Ferguson may refer to:

- Homer S. Ferguson (1889–1982), judge of the United States Court of Military Appeals
- Warren J. Ferguson (1920–2008), judge of the United States Court of Appeals for the Ninth Circuit
- Wilkie D. Ferguson (1938–2003), judge of the United States District Court for the Southern District of Florida
