= Robin L. Rosenberg =

American judge (born 1962)

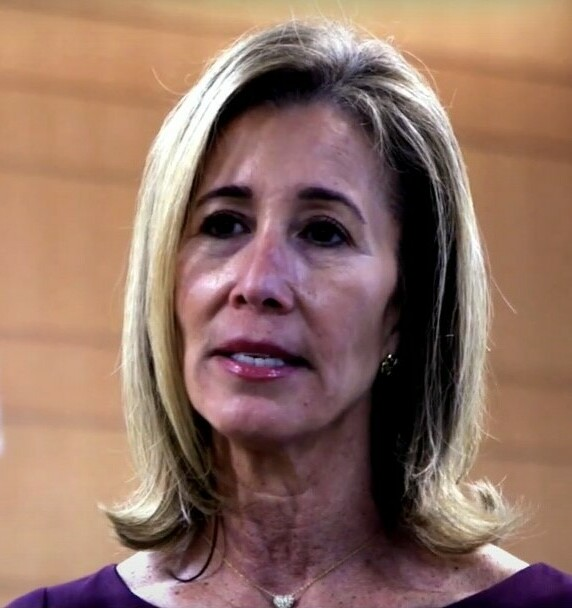

Director of the Federal Judicial Center
- Incumbent
- Assumed office August 25, 2025
- Preceded by: John S. Cooke

Judge of the United States District Court for the Southern District of Florida
- Incumbent
- Assumed office July 24, 2014
- Appointed by: Barack Obama
- Preceded by: Adalberto Jordan

Personal details
- Born: Robin Lee Rosenberg; 1962 (age 63–64) West Palm Beach, Florida, U.S.
- Education: Princeton University (BA); Duke University (MA, JD)

Robin Lee Rosenberg (born 1962) is a United States district judge of the United States District Court for the Southern District of Florida and former Florida circuit court judge.

== Education and early career ==
Rosenberg received a Bachelor of Arts degree in 1983 from Princeton University. She received a Master of Arts degree and Juris Doctor in 1989 from Duke University and Duke University School of Law. She began her legal career as a law clerk to Judge James Carriger Paine of the United States District Court for the Southern District of Florida from 1989 to 1990. She served as a trial attorney in the Civil Rights Division of the United States Department of Justice from 1990 to 1994. While on leave from that position, she worked at a non profit organization in the Czech Republic from 1993 to 1994. She was an associate at the law firm of Foley & Lardner from 1994 to 1995. She served as an assistant city attorney for the City of West Palm Beach, Florida, from 1995 to 1997. She was a partner at Holland & Knight LLP, from 1997 to 1999. She served as vice president and general counsel at the Slim Fast Foods Company from 1999 to 2001. She was a partner at the law firm of Rosenberg & McAuliffe, PL, from 2001 to 2006, and concurrently managed ARC Mediation, a full service dispute resolution firm, from 2002 to 2006. From 2007 to 2014, she was a circuit court judge in the Fifteenth Judicial Circuit.

== Federal judicial service ==
On February 26, 2014, President Barack Obama nominated Rosenberg to serve as a United States District Judge of the United States District Court for the Southern District of Florida, to the seat vacated by Judge Adalberto Jordan, who was elevated to the court of appeals on February 24, 2012. She received a hearing before the United States Senate Judiciary Committee on May 20, 2014. On June 19, 2014 her nomination was reported out of committee by a voice vote. On July 16, 2014, Senate Majority Leader Harry Reid filed a motion to invoke cloture on Rosenberg's nomination. On July 22, 2014 the Senate invoked cloture on her nomination by a 58–42 vote. Later that day, Rosenberg was confirmed by a 100–0 vote. She received her judicial commission on July 24, 2014.

In 2020, Rosenberg presided over the federal multidistrict litigation consolidating cases brought by users of the heartburn medication Zantac (ranitidine), who alleged that the drug caused cancer through degradation into the carcinogen NDMA.

On July 23, 2025, Rosenberg declined to release additional grand jury documents from the criminal investigation into Jeffrey Epstein, citing that the Department of Justice's request to release the documents was not part of a judicial proceeding. Rosenberg was the victim of antisemitic posts, notably on the social networking service X following the ruling.

In April 2025, she was elected as director of the Federal Judicial Center, assuming that office in August 2025.

On February 6, 2026, after 27 Republican state attorneys general, led by West Virginia, demanded the immediate removal of the climate science chapter from the Reference Manual on Scientific Evidence on the grounds that it allegedly painted a highly biased, agenda-driven portrayal of climate change that targeted the oil and gas industry, she ordered the removal of this chapter from the manual.

== Personal life ==
Rosenberg is married to former Florida State Attorney for Palm Beach County Michael McAuliffe, who left that office to serve as general counsel for Oxbow Carbon.

== See also ==
- List of Jewish American jurists

Legal offices
Preceded by Adalberto Jordan	Judge of the United States District Court for the Southern District of Florida; 2014–present	Incumbent
