= Antonietta Collins =

Mexican-American sportscaster

- Antonietta González-Collins
- Born: November 22, 1985 (age 40); Mexico City, Mexico
- Citizenship: Mexico; United States
- Education: University of Mount Union
- Occupations: Television journalist, news anchor
- Employer: ESPN
- Parent: María Antonieta Collins

Antonietta "Toni" Gonzalez-Collins (born November 22, 1985) is a Mexican-American sportscaster. She currently works for ESPN as a news anchor for SportsCenter and occasionally, host SportsNation. She joined ESPN in 2016. She is the daughter of the television reporter María Antonieta Collins.

== Early life and education ==
Collins began playing soccer at the age of 10 and was asked to join Mexico's national team in the under-19 division. She attended St. Brendan High School in Miami, FL. She is a graduate of Mount Union College in Alliance, Ohio, with a bachelor's degree in communications, with an emphasis in sports management. She played on the women's soccer team. She also played softball.

== Career ==
Upon graduating in 2013, she became a production assistant at Univision in Miami, Florida and has collaborated with producers of national programs such as Nuestra Belleza Latina, Premios Lo Nuestro, Premios Juventud and Primer Impacto. She also worked with the CBS Sports Radio affiliate in St. Petersburg, Florida, as a production assistant, then as a sports reporter covering the Tampa Bay Buccaneers, the Tampa Bay Lightning and the University of South Florida football team. In 2013, Collins accepted her first on-camera job as a news reporter for Univision's Noticias 48/FOX2 news team at the dual-language station in McAllen, Texas, where she covered stories on immigration and drug trafficking on both sides of the Texas-Mexico border, also filling in as a sports and weather anchor. Previously, Toni Collins was a sports anchor and reporter for Deportes 23, Univision's Dallas affiliate, where she covered the NBA postseason and finals, Major League Baseball’s playoffs, the Dallas Cowboys, FC Dallas and the Dallas Stars. She also produced and anchored Univision 23's local sports show Accion Deportiva Extra. She first auditioned for ESPN in 2015 and again a year later wherein she was hired.
