= Henry Lee Adams Jr. =

American judge (born 1945)

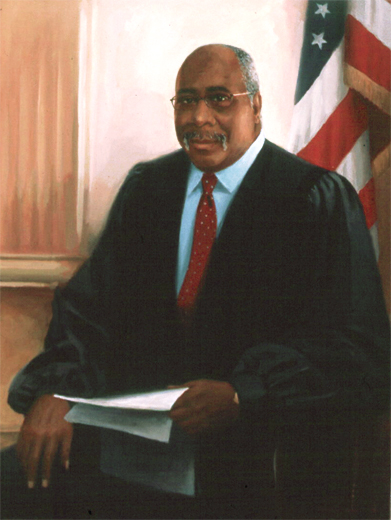

Senior Judge of the United States District Court for the Middle District of Florida
- Incumbent
- Assumed office April 8, 2010

Judge of the United States District Court for the Middle District of Florida
- In office November 24, 1993 – April 8, 2010
- Appointed by: Bill Clinton
- Preceded by: Susan H. Black
- Succeeded by: Roy B. Dalton Jr.

Judge of the Fourth Judicial Circuit of Florida
- In office October 1979 – November 24, 1993
- Appointed by: Bob Graham

Personal details
- Born: Henry Lee Adams Jr. April 8, 1945 (age 80) Jacksonville, Florida, U.S.
- Spouse: Elaine Adams
- Education: Florida A&M University (BS); Howard University School of Law (JD)

Henry Lee Adams Jr. (born April 8, 1945) is a senior United States district judge of the United States District Court for the Middle District of Florida.

== Education and career ==
Adams was born in Jacksonville, Florida and graduated from Matthew Gilbert High School in Jacksonville in 1962. He received his Bachelor of Science degree in political science from Florida A&M University in 1966 and his Juris Doctor from Howard University School of Law in 1969.

Adams was awarded Reginald Heber Smith Fellow in April 1969. He completed a Consumer Rights and Poverty Law training program at Haverford College and was assigned to the Duval County Legal Aid Association, a legal aid society in Duval County, Florida, from 1969 to 1970. He was an assistant public defender of the Fourth Judicial Circuit of Florida (Duval, Clay, and Nassau counties) from November 1970 to 1972. In January 1972, he entered private practice in Jacksonville, first with the firm of Sheppard, Fletcher, Hand & Adams and then in 1976 with Marshall and Adams. In October 1979, Governor Bob Graham appointed Adams a judge of the Fourth Judicial Circuit.

== Federal judicial service ==
Adams remained a judge on that court until 1993, when President Bill Clinton nominated him to the United States District Court for the Middle District of Florida on October 29, 1993, to the seat vacated by Judge Susan H. Black. He was confirmed by the United States Senate on November 20, 1993, and received his commission four days later. Adams was assigned to the Tampa Division of the court from December 1993 until April 2000, when he was reassigned to the Jacksonville Division. Adams assumed senior status on April 8, 2010.

== See also ==
- List of African-American federal judges
- List of African-American jurists
- List of first minority male lawyers and judges in Florida

Legal offices
Preceded by Susan H. Black	Judge of the United States District Court for the Middle District of Florida; 1993–2010	Succeeded by Roy B. Dalton Jr.
