= Roy B. Dalton Jr. =

American judge (born 1952)

Senior Judge of the United States District Court for the Middle District of Florida
- Incumbent
- Assumed office July 9, 2022

Judge of the United States District Court for the Middle District of Florida
- In office May 3, 2011 – July 9, 2022
- Appointed by: Barack Obama
- Preceded by: Henry Lee Adams Jr.
- Succeeded by: Julie S. Sneed

Personal details
- Born: Roy Bale Dalton Jr. July 9, 1952 (age 73) Jacksonville, Florida, U.S.
- Education: University of Florida (BA, JD)

Roy Bale "Skip" Dalton Jr. (born July 9, 1952) is a senior United States district judge of the United States District Court for the Middle District of Florida.

== Early life and education ==
Dalton was born on July 9, 1952, in Jacksonville, Florida. He earned a Bachelor of Arts in 1974 from the University of Florida and a Juris Doctor in 1976 from the University of Florida Levin College of Law.

== Career ==
From 1977 until 2011, Dalton worked as a civil litigator for a variety of different law firms. From 1977 until 1980, he was an associate for an Orlando, Florida, law firm, Dean, Ringers, Morgan and Lawton, PA, and from 1980 until 1982, he was a principal at that firm. From 1982 until 1984, Dalton was in solo private practice in Orlando, and he was part of a larger law firm in Orlando as a principal from 1984 until 1986. He was part of a different Orlando law firm from 1986 until 1989, and then from 1989 until 1998, he was part of an Orlando law firm where one of his fellow partners was future United States Senator Mel Martinez. From 1999 until 2001, Dalton was again in solo legal practice in Orlando, and he was a principal in an Orlando firm in partnership with another lawyer from 2001 until 2003. From 2004 to 2011, Dalton had been of counsel to The Carlyle Appellate Law Firm in The Villages, Florida. He also served as a counsel to Martinez in 2005 and 2006.

=== Federal judicial service ===
On November 17, 2010, President Barack Obama nominated Dalton to fill a judicial vacancy on the U.S. District Court for the Middle District of Florida that was created by the transition to senior status by Judge Henry Lee Adams Jr. in April 2010. His nomination lapsed at the end of 2010, and Obama renominated him on January 5, 2011. On March 2, 2011, the Senate Judiciary Committee held a hearing on his nomination. Pursuant to an agreement of April 14, 2011, the Senate deemed his nomination confirmed by unanimous consent during executive proceedings that were held on May 2, 2011. He received his commission on May 3, 2011. He assumed senior status on July 9, 2022, his 70th birthday.

Legal offices
Preceded by Henry Lee Adams Jr.	Judge of the United States District Court for the Middle District of Florida; 2011–2022	Succeeded by Julie S. Sneed
