= Susan H. Black =

American judge (born 1943)

Susan Black
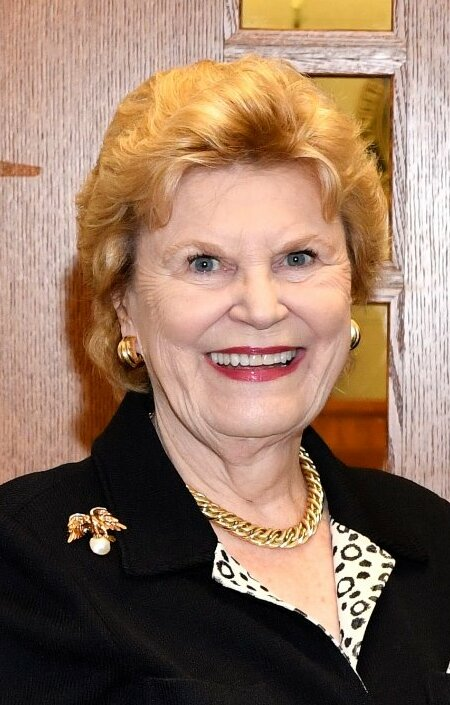
- Black in 2022

Senior Judge of the United States Court of Appeals for the Eleventh Circuit
- Incumbent
- Assumed office February 25, 2011

Judge of the United States Court of Appeals for the Eleventh Circuit
- In office August 12, 1992 – February 25, 2011
- Appointed by: George H. W. Bush
- Preceded by: Thomas Alonzo Clark
- Succeeded by: Adalberto Jordan

Chief Judge of the United States District Court for the Middle District of Florida
- In office 1990–1992
- Preceded by: George C. Carr
- Succeeded by: John H. Moore II

Judge of the United States District Court for the Middle District of Florida
- In office July 24, 1979 – September 3, 1992
- Appointed by: Jimmy Carter
- Preceded by: Seat established
- Succeeded by: Henry Lee Adams Jr.

Personal details
- Born: Susan Sims Harrell; October 20, 1943 (age 81); Valdosta, Georgia, U.S.
- Education: Florida State University (BA); University of Florida (JD); University of Virginia (LLM)

Susan Sims Harrell Black (born October 20, 1943) is an American lawyer who serves as a senior United States circuit judge of the United States Court of Appeals for the Eleventh Circuit. She was a former United States district judge of the United States District Court for the Middle District of Florida. She was the first female federal court judge in Florida.

== Education and career ==
Black was born in Valdosta, Georgia. She earned her Bachelor of Arts from Florida State University in 1964 and her Juris Doctor from the University of Florida College of Law in 1967. Black was a high school teacher in Jacksonville, Florida from 1967 to 1968 and an attorney for the United States Army Corps of Engineers in Jacksonville from 1968 to 1969. From 1969 to 1972 she served as assistant state attorney in Jacksonville and from 1972 to 1973 she served as assistant general counsel for the City of Jacksonville. She received a Master of Laws from the University of Virginia School of Law in 1984.

=== State judicial service ===
Black was a judge in Duval County Court from 1973 to 1975 and was a judge in the state Fourth Judicial Circuit (Duval, Clay, and Nassau counties) from 1975 to 1979.

=== Federal judicial service ===
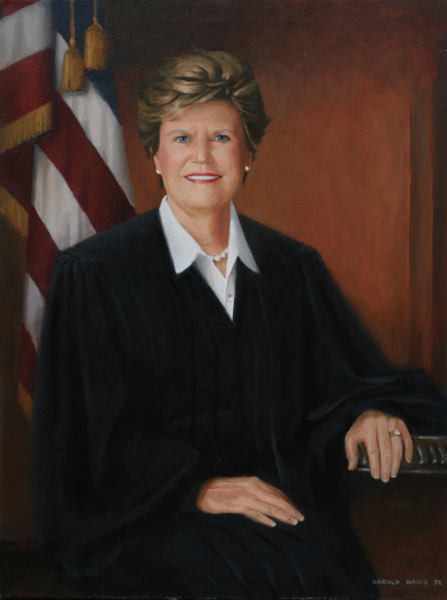
Black's court portrait.

President Jimmy Carter nominated Black to the United States District Court for the Middle District of Florida on May 22, 1979, to a new seat created by 92 Stat. 1629. She was confirmed by the Senate on July 23, 1979, she received her commission the next day. Black served as chief judge from 1990 to 1992. Her service terminated on September 3, 1992, due to elevation to the Eleventh Circuit.

President George H. W. Bush nominated Black to the United States Court of Appeals for the Eleventh Circuit on March 10, 1992, to the seat vacated by Judge Thomas Alonzo Clark. Confirmed by the Senate on August 11, 1992, she received her commission the next day and began serving on the court on September 3, 1992. On February 25, 2011, Black assumed senior status.

== See also ==
- List of first women lawyers and judges in Florida

Legal offices
New seat	Judge of the United States District Court for the Middle District of Florida; 1979–1992	Succeeded by Henry Lee Adams Jr.
Preceded by George C. Carr	Chief Judge of the United States District Court for the Middle District of Florida; 1990–1992	Succeeded by John H. Moore II
Preceded by Thomas Alonzo Clark	Judge of the United States Court of Appeals for the Eleventh Circuit; 1992–2011	Succeeded by Adalberto Jordan
