= Frank Angones =

Cuban-American lawyer (born 1951)

- Born: July 21, 1950 (age 76); Havana, Cuba

Frank Angones (born as Francisco Ramon Angones y Del Monte on July 21, 1950 in Havana, Cuba) is a Cuban-American lawyer. He is the first Cuban-born head of the Florida Bar. Angones is also the first Hispanic to be elected president of the Dade County Bar Association and the youngest attorney to be elected president of the Cuban-American Bar Association.

Angones came to the United States by way of the Operation Peter Pan when he was 11 years old. He later studied at Immaculata-LaSalle High School, graduating in 1968 and graduated magna cum laude from the University of Miami (B.A., 1972). He later graduated from the University of Miami School of Law in 1976.

He mainly focuses on Tort defense and commercial litigation. He is best known for human rights cases, which include a 1994 case against the United States government for holding Cuban migrants picked up at sea at Guantanamo Bay and representing the families of those shot down in the Brothers to the Rescue mission in 1996. He is a partner at law firm of Angones, McClure & Garcia. He became the head of the Florida Bar, which is the third-largest state bar in country, in 2007. He and his wife, Georgina Alfonsin, have one son, Francisco R. Angones Jr. His great-great-grandfather was Pedro Figueredo, the author of the Cuban national anthem.
