= Jacqueline Becerra =

American judge (born 1970)

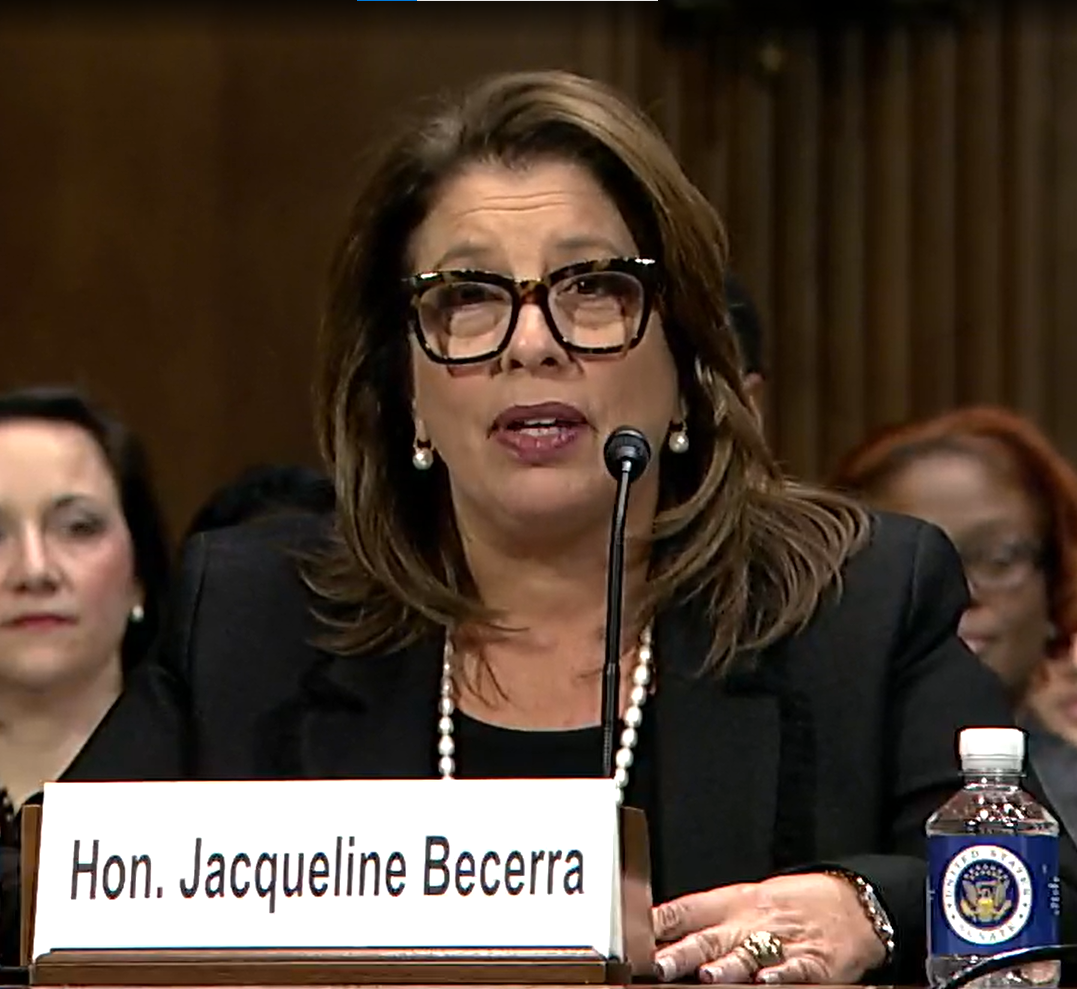

Judge of the United States District Court for the Southern District of Florida
- Incumbent
- Assumed office February 29, 2024
- Appointed by: Joe Biden
- Preceded by: Marcia G. Cooke

Magistrate Judge of the United States District Court for the Southern District of Florida
- In office January 5, 2019 – February 29, 2024

Personal details
- Born: 1970 (age 55–56) Miami Beach, Florida, U.S.
- Education: University of Miami (BA); Yale University (JD)

Jacqueline Becerra (born 1970) is an American lawyer from Florida who has served as a United States district judge of the United States District Court for the Southern District of Florida since 2024. She previously served as a United States magistrate judge of the same court from 2019 to 2024.

== Education ==
Becerra earned a Bachelor of Arts from the University of Miami in 1991. She earned a Juris Doctor from Yale Law School in 1994.

== Career ==
Becerra first joined the U.S. Department of Justice through its Honors Program, serving in the Civil Division Federal Programs Branch, which defends the Executive branch of the United States Government in civil suits, from 1994 to 1997 and then in the U.S. Attorney's Office for the District of Columbia from 1997 to 1999. She served as an assistant United States attorney U.S. Attorney’s Office for the Southern District of Florida from 1999 to 2002 then as a Special Counsel from 2002 to 2004. From 2004 to 2018, she worked as a shareholder at the law firm Greenberg Traurig, P.A. in Miami, where she worked in the Litigation and Foreign Corrupt Practices Act (FCPA) & Global Anti-Corruption practices division. Becerra served as a United States magistrate judge for the Southern District of Florida from January 5, 2019 to February 29, 2024.

=== Notable cases ===
Becerra oversaw the extradition hearing of Mario Palacios Palacios, who participated in the assassination of Haitian President Jovenel Moise in 2021.

=== Federal judicial service ===
On November 1, 2023, President Joe Biden announced his intent to nominate Becerra to serve as a United States district judge of the United States District Court for the Southern District of Florida. On November 6, 2023, her nomination was sent to the Senate. President Biden nominated Becerra to the seat vacated by Judge Marcia G. Cooke, who assumed senior status on July 15, 2022. On November 29, 2023, a hearing on her nomination was held before the Senate Judiciary Committee. During her confirmation hearing, she was questioned by Senator Marsha Blackburn over her past membership with the American Constitution Society and whether she would be impartial as a federal judge. On January 3, 2024, her nomination was returned to the president under Rule XXXI, Paragraph 6 of the United States Senate and she was renominated on January 8, 2024. On January 18, 2024, her nomination was reported out of committee by a 13–8 vote. On February 26, 2024, the Senate invoked cloture on her nomination by a 56–38 vote. On February 27, 2024, her nomination was confirmed by a 56–40 vote. She received her judicial commission on February 29, 2024.

== See also ==
- List of Hispanic and Latino American jurists

Legal offices
Preceded by Marcia G. Cooke	Judge of the United States District Court for the Southern District of Florida; 2024–present	Incumbent
