= Julie S. Sneed =

American judge (born 1969)

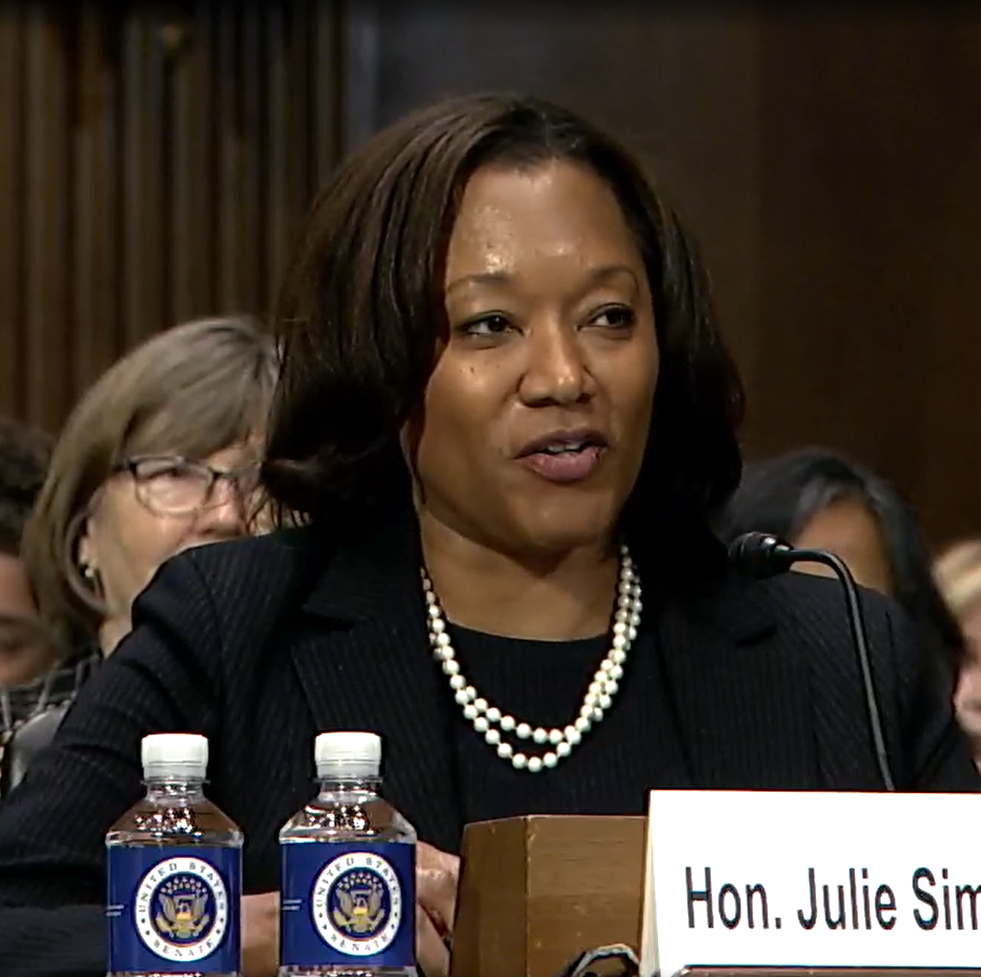

Judge of the United States District Court for the Middle District of Florida
- Incumbent
- Assumed office March 4, 2024
- Appointed by: Joe Biden
- Preceded by: Roy B. Dalton Jr.

Magistrate Judge of the United States District Court for the Middle District of Florida
- In office June 15, 2015 – March 4, 2024
- Succeeded by: Samuel Horovitz

Personal details
- Born: Julie Simone Guider; 1969 (age 56–57) Fort Lauderdale, Florida, U.S.
- Education: University of Florida (BS); Florida State University (JD)

Julie Simone Sneed (née Guider; born 1969) is an American lawyer who has served as a United States district judge of the United States District Court for the Middle District of Florida since 2024. She previously served as a United States magistrate judge of the same court from 2015 to 2024.

== Education ==
Sneed received a Bachelor of Science from the University of Florida in 1991 and a Juris Doctor from the Florida State University College of Law in 1994.

== Career ==
Sneed was a law clerk for Judge Chris W. Altenbernd on the Florida Second District Court of Appeal from 1995 to 1997 and for Judge James D. Whittemore of the United States District Court for the Middle District of Florida from 2000 to 2004. From 1997 to 2000, she was a litigation associate at Trenam, Kemker, Scharf, Barkin, Frye, O’Neill & Mullis, P.A. in Tampa. From 2004 to 2012, she was an associate and later a partner at Fowler White Boggs Banker, P.A. in their Tampa office. From 2012 to 2015, she worked as a partner at Akerman LLP. From 2015 to 2024, she served as a United States magistrate judge for the Middle District of Florida.

=== Federal judicial service ===
On November 1, 2023, President Joe Biden announced his intent to nominate Sneed to serve as a United States district judge of the United States District Court for the Middle District of Florida. Her nomination was part of a bipartisan package of nominees which included David S. Leibowitz. On November 6, 2023, her nomination was sent to the Senate. President Biden nominated Sneed to the seat vacated by Judge Roy B. Dalton Jr., who assumed senior status on July 9, 2022. On November 29, 2023, a hearing on her nomination was held before the Senate Judiciary Committee. On January 3, 2024, her nomination was returned to the president under Rule XXXI, Paragraph 6 of the United States Senate and she was renominated on January 8, 2024. On January 18, 2024, her nomination was reported out of committee by a 12–9 vote. On February 28, 2024, the Senate invoked cloture on her nomination by a 54–43 vote. Later that day, her nomination was confirmed by a 54–44 vote. She received her judicial commission on March 4, 2024.

== See also ==
- List of African American federal judges
- List of African American jurists

Legal offices
Preceded by Roy B. Dalton Jr.	Judge of the United States District Court for the Middle District of Florida; 2024–present	Incumbent
