= James B. Sanderlin =

American judge

James Bernard Sanderlin (January 2, 1929 – April 20, 1990) was a lawyer who, during the American Civil Rights Movement of the 1960s, used litigation to fight for equality and against discrimination in Pinellas County, Florida. During this time Sanderlin was one of only five African American attorneys who practiced in racially divided St. Petersburg, Florida. Sanderlin devoted his career to unifying blacks and whites in his community in an effort to move toward social and legal equality. While living in Boston, Massachusetts, in the late 1950s, Sanderlin felt compelled to move to the South to try to make a difference for minorities there. All of his life he had lived peacefully alongside whites, so it was not hard for him to envision an American society where the Brown v. Board of Education Supreme Court decision was implemented and equality was practiced and not just talked about.

As an attorney, he argued cases for school desegregation, against employment and housing discrimination, and other related civil rights cases. In 1972, Sanderlin became the first black judge of Pinellas County. By 1976, his skill and reputation afforded him a seat on the circuit-level court where he presided for over ten years. In 1985, then Governor Bob Graham appointed him to the Florida District Court of Appeals. He served on the court for two years, until he was forced to step down from the bench after developing Pick’s disease, a rare neurodegenerative disorder related to Alzheimer's disease. Three years after he stepped down from the bench, Sanderlin died from natural causes at the age of 61. Through his diligent work during the Civil Rights Movement, Sanderlin convinced many people that "important differences can be resolved through reasonable argument and law".

== Early life ==
James B. Sanderlin was born in Petersburg, Virginia. He was the son of a Baptist minister, Willis Elijah Sanderlin, and a school teacher, Lillie Sanderlin. He had two older brothers, Willis, Jr., and Raymond. From the age of five, he was convinced of his desire to become an attorney. He had a relatively privileged childhood compared to other black children in the 1930s, growing up with two educated parents in a middle class integrated neighborhood, where they played freely with white children. The Sanderlin children attended a private all-black school but still interacted frequently with whites.

James Sanderlin was influenced greatly by his parents. He was told stories about the importance of historical black figures like Frederick Douglass, W. E. B. Du Bois, and Sojourner Truth. His parents instilled in him Christian values, the importance of making a positive contribution to society, and to strive to achieve whatever goals he set for himself. As James and his brothers grew older their neighbors became less friendly, and their frequent interactions dwindled. The Southern custom at that time was for white parents to permit their children to play and interact with black children until the children reached puberty. When his older brothers reached the ages of 15 and 12, Sanderlin's family moved from Virginia to Washington, D.C.

== Education ==
In 1950, James graduated from Howard University, the nation’s preeminent black college. Taking a hiatus from schooling, he worked at jobs ranging from helicopter repairs to working at the fish market owned by his brother Willis (Sandy) who opened it after earning his MBA from Howard U. James then went back to school and received a master's degree in political science in 1957. While in graduate school, as he continued to work to pay for his tuition, he experienced first-hand the inequality between blacks and whites, both socially and financially. These experiences fueled his desire to attend law school and ultimately fight to make a difference. He went on to Boston University School of Law in 1958 where he enrolled under an enrollment quota and later graduated. He began to work with attorney Fred G. Minnis in 1963. Minnis was also an alumnus of Howard University, and recruited Sanderlin while traveling around some of the nation’s best colleges in pursuit of talented black law school graduates. Sanderlin clerked for Minnis until he was admitted to The Florida Bar in 1963, and began to be actively involved in the local civil rights movement.

== Career ==
After a short time, Sanderlin left Minnis and Williams, P.A., and formed his own law practice with attorneys Frank White and Frank Peterman, known as White, Peterman and Sanderlin, P.A, located on 22nd Street South in St. Petersburg, Florida. At first the firm struggled, as most people around this time overlooked black attorneys and favored more established firms downtown.

Sanderlin's first priority was desegregating Pinellas County Schools. Surprisingly, some of his most vocal opposition came from members of the black community, many of whom wanted to maintain Gibbs High School as an all-black school. Sanderlin received threats to boycott his office and even threats against his life. However, Sanderlin persevered and over the next ten years, with the help of the NAACP Legal Defense and Educational Fund, he went on to desegregate the schools in Pinellas, Hillsborough, and Sarasota counties. His arguments often focused on the inequalities that were apparent between white and black schools. His legal tactics were nearly identical to the strategies used by the NAACP.

After the Brown v. Board of Education decision, Florida created legal measures to prevent integration. Governor LeRoy Collins started the Fabinski Committee to devise a strategic plan to avoid integration in Florida’s schools. The Pinellas County School Board also at that time engaged in strategic maneuvers to give the impression of integration instead of fully integrating. Sanderlin argued that the Pinellas County School board failed to integrate with "all deliberate speed", as the Brown v. Board of Education ruling stipulated. On January 15, 1965, District Court Judge Lieb ordered the Pinellas County School Board to come up with a desegregation plan that eliminated dual attendance zones and reassigned pupils, faculty and other personnel on a non-racial basis.

In 1968 Sanderlin represented more than 200 city sanitation workers who were on strike for better working conditions. The city fired the workers, and they came to Sanderlin for help. On August 30, 1968, he not only got 86 of the 211 workers back their jobs, but also got the workers the better working conditions that they asked for. The workers who did not receive their jobs returned to their jobs later, or received other forms of employment during the strike. This case represented a dramatic shift in labor relations between the city and its workers. The case served to voice the concerns of ignored blacks and poor people during this time and unified many within the city.

== Legacy ==
James B. Sanderlin became Pinellas County’s first black judge on September 12, 1972. After three years as a county judge, he ran and was elected as the first black judge to serve on the Circuit Court of Pinellas and Pasco Counties in 1976. Ten years later, on January 2, 1986, he was appointed judge on the Florida District Court of Appeals, the first black judge to hold that position. He was generally regarded as personable, warm and outgoing. While on the bench as a judge he often voiced his concerns for issues within the black community. He was honored with the opening of James Sanderlin Elementary, located at 2350 22nd Ave South, St. Petersburg, Florida. He was also inducted into the Florida Civil Rights Hall of Fame in April 2013, where his brother Raymond Sanderlin and his niece Paula Sanderlin Dorosti received a standing ovation from the Florida House of Representatives in honor of his brother and her uncle’s work.

== See also ==
- List of African-American jurists
- List of first minority male lawyers and judges in Florida
