= Marcia G. Cooke =

American judge (1954–2023)

Marcia Gail Cooke

Senior Judge of the United States District Court for the Southern District of Florida
- In office July 15, 2022 – January 27, 2023

Judge of the United States District Court for the Southern District of Florida
- In office May 18, 2004 – July 15, 2022
- Appointed by: George W. Bush
- Preceded by: Wilkie D. Ferguson
- Succeeded by: Jacqueline Becerra

Magistrate Judge of the United States District Court for the Eastern District of Michigan
- In office 1984–1992

Personal details
- Born: Marcia Gail Cooke; October 16, 1954 Sumter, South Carolina, U.S.
- Died: January 27, 2023 (aged 68) Detroit, Michigan, U.S.
- Education: Georgetown University (BSFS); Wayne State University (JD)

Marcia Gail Cooke (October 16, 1954 – January 27, 2023) was an American lawyer who served as a United States district judge of the United States District Court for the Southern District of Florida.

== Early life and education ==
Cooke was born in 1954 in Sumter, South Carolina. She graduated from the Edmund A. Walsh School of Foreign Service at Georgetown University with a Bachelor of Science in Foreign Service in 1975 and from Wayne State University Law School with a Juris Doctor in 1977.

== Career ==
Cooke was a staff attorney for Neighborhood Legal Services in Michigan from 1978 to 1979 and was a Deputy Public Defender of the Legal Aid and Defender Association in Michigan from 1979 to 1980. Cooke served as an Assistant U.S. Attorney for the Eastern District of Michigan from 1980 to 1983. From 1983 to 1984 Cooke was in private practice in Michigan with the firm of Miro, Miro and Weiner. Cooke served as a United States Magistrate Judge of the United States District Court for the Eastern District of Michigan from 1984 to 1992.

In 1992 Cooke served as Director of Professional Development and Training at the U.S. Attorney's Office for the Southern District of Florida. From 1992 to 1994 she was the Executive Assistant U.S. Attorney for the Southern District of Florida, before returning to her prior position as director of professional development and training from 1994 to 1999. Cooke served as Chief Inspector General for the Executive Office of the Governor of Florida under Jeb Bush from 1999 to 2002. From 2002 to 2004 she was Assistant County Attorney in Miami-Dade County.

=== Federal judicial service ===
President George W. Bush nominated Cooke to the United States District Court for the Southern District of Florida on November 25, 2003, to the seat vacated by Wilkie D. Ferguson. She was confirmed by the Senate on May 18, 2004, by a vote of 96–0. Cooke received her commission the same day. She is the first African-American woman federal judge in Florida. She assumed senior status on July 15, 2022, due to health concerns.

Cooke presided over the trials of José Padilla in 2007, and his re-sentencing in 2014.

== Personal life and death ==
Cooke was Catholic.

Cooke died in Detroit on January 27, 2023, at the age of 68. She had inoperable cancer, and her health had further declined in 2022 after a pulmonary embolism.

== See also ==
- List of African-American federal judges
- List of African-American jurists

== Sources ==
Legal offices
Preceded by Wilkie D. Ferguson	Judge of the United States District Court for the Southern District of Florida; 2004–2022	Succeeded by Jacqueline Becerra
