= Adalberto Jordan =

American judge (born 1961)

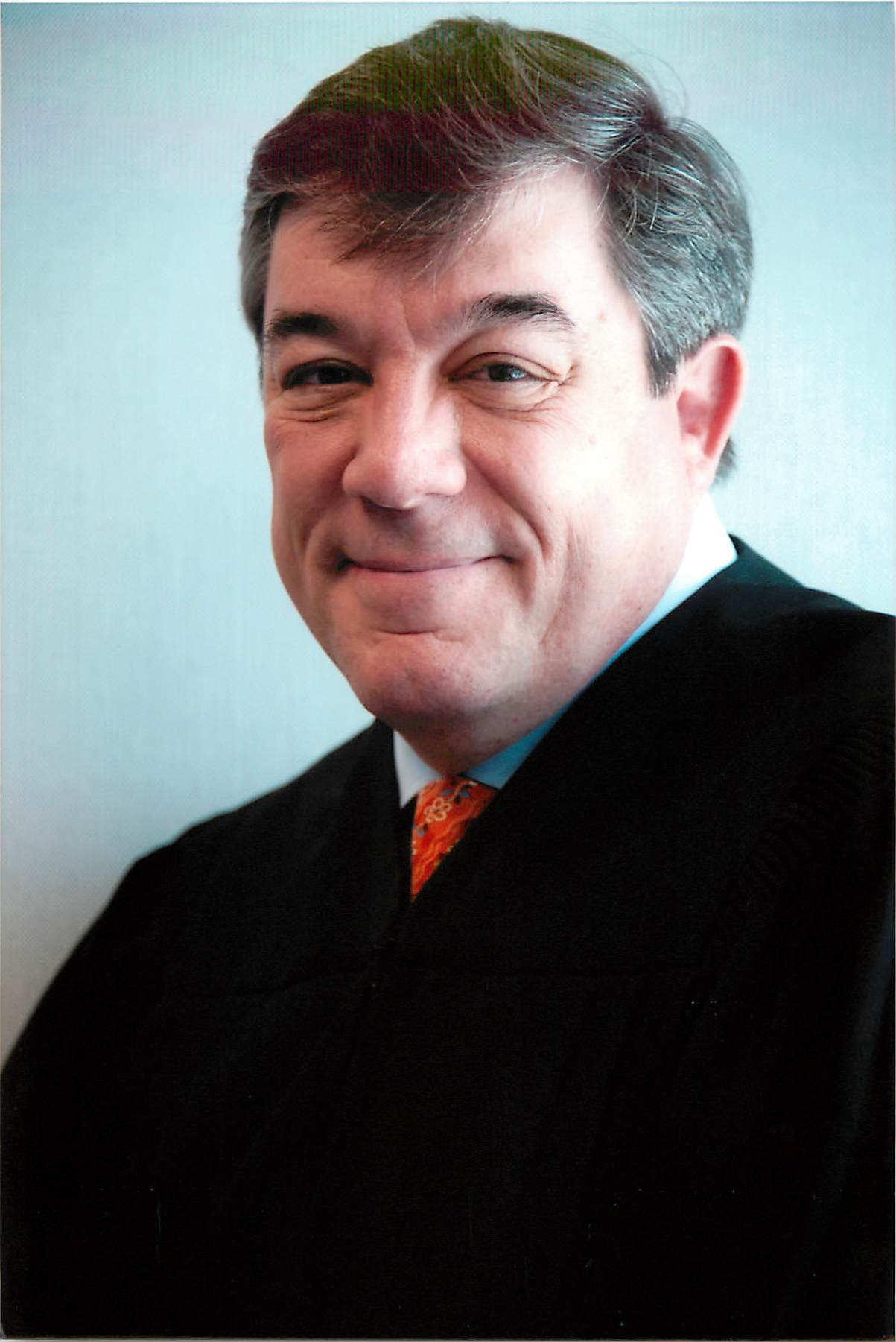
- Jordan in 2015

Judge of the United States Court of Appeals for the Eleventh Circuit
- Incumbent
- Assumed office February 17, 2012
- Appointed by: Barack Obama
- Preceded by: Susan H. Black

Judge of the United States District Court for the Southern District of Florida
- In office September 9, 1999 – February 24, 2012
- Appointed by: Bill Clinton
- Preceded by: Lenore Carrero Nesbitt
- Succeeded by: Robin L. Rosenberg

Personal details
- Born: Adalberto Jose Jordan; December 7, 1961 (age 64) Havana, Cuba
- Party: Democratic
- Education: University of Miami (BA, JD)

Adalberto Jose Jordan (born December 7, 1961) is an American lawyer who serves as a United States circuit judge of the United States Court of Appeals for the Eleventh Circuit. He is also an adjunct professor at the University of Miami School of Law, his alma mater, and at Florida International University's College of Law. In February 2016, The New York Times identified Jordan as a potential Supreme Court nominee to replace Justice Antonin Scalia. In early March, Jordan removed himself from consideration.

== Early life and education ==
Jordan was born in Havana, Cuba, and came with his family to Miami, Florida, when he was a young boy, in 1968.

Jordan graduated from St. Brendan High School in 1980. He received a Bachelor of Arts degree in politics, magna cum laude, from the University of Miami, in 1984. While an undergraduate at the University of Miami, Jordan was a walk-on member of the baseball team. Jordan then earned his Juris Doctor summa cum laude, from the University of Miami School of Law in 1987, where he was the Articles & Comments Editor for the University of Miami Law Review, graduating second in his law school class.

== Career ==
Jordan served as a law clerk for Judge Thomas Alonzo Clark of the United States Court of Appeals for the Eleventh Circuit in Atlanta, Georgia, from 1987 to 1988, and for Justice Sandra Day O'Connor of the United States Supreme Court from 1988 to 1989. In 1989, Jordan returned to Miami to work as an associate for Steel Hector & Davis, a prestigious local law firm that was acquired by Squire, Sanders & Dempsey in 2005. Despite being there a relatively short time, Jordan was named a partner at Steel, Hector & Davis by his fifth year, where he focused on appellate and commercial law. Shortly after making partner, Jordan made the transition to public-sector lawyering, and became an Assistant United States Attorney for the Southern District of Florida in 1994. In 1998, he was appointed Chief of the Appellate Division, and served in that position for about one year. Since 1990, he has been an adjunct professor at the University of Miami School of Law.

== Federal judicial service ==
=== District court service ===
On March 15, 1999, President Bill Clinton nominated Jordan to the seat on the United States District Court for the Southern District of Florida that had been vacated by Judge Lenore Carrero Nesbitt. Jordan was confirmed to the federal bench by the United States Senate on September 8, 1999, by a 93–1 vote, with then-Senator Bob Smith of New Hampshire as the lone dissenting vote. Jordan received his commission on September 9, 1999. His service as a district court judge was terminated on February 24, 2012 when he was elevated to the court of appeals.

=== Eleventh Circuit service ===
In May 2011, the South Florida Daily Business Review reported that Jordan was being vetted by the Federal Bureau of Investigation in anticipation of President Obama nominating Jordan to a vacancy on the United States Court of Appeals for the Eleventh Circuit created by Judge Susan H. Black, who assumed senior status in February 2011. On August 2, 2011, President Barack Obama nominated Jordan for the judgeship.

On October 13, 2011, the Senate Judiciary Committee approved his nomination by a voice vote. On February 9, 2012, Senate Majority Leader Harry Reid moved to invoke cloture on Jordan's nomination, thereby cutting off debate and ending a Republican filibuster of Jordan's nomination. On February 13, 2012, the United States Senate invoked cloture on his nomination by an 89–5 vote. On February 15, 2012, Jordan was confirmed by a 94–5 vote. Jordan received his judicial commission on February 17, 2012.

== Notable cases ==
- In Jones et al. v. DeSantis, a 2020 voting rights case, Jordan wrote a 94-page dissenting opinion. 2018 Florida Amendment 4 permitted former felons to vote; however, Florida Governor Ron DeSantis signed a law that required former felons to pay all legal fees before being eligible to vote again, despite some of them not knowing how much they owed. By a 6–4 vote, the en banc Eleventh Circuit found that the statute did not violate the Equal Protection Clause and was not a poll tax in violation of the Twenty-fourth Amendment. Jordan concluded his dissent with "Paying hundreds of dollars in fees and costs is an 'onerous' burden to those with limited means, and 70 to 80 percent of Florida felons are indigent. They should not be forced to choose between 'putting food on the table, a roof over their heads, and clothes on their backs,'—or paying fees that Florida uses to fund government operations—in order to exercise the right to vote granted to them by Amendment 4."

== Personal life ==
Adalberto Jordan is married to Lazara Esther Jordan, née Castillo, a teacher at St. Brendan Catholic High School, of which both are alumni.

== See also ==
- Barack Obama Supreme Court candidates
- Barack Obama judicial appointment controversies
- List of Hispanic and Latino American jurists
- List of law clerks for the eighth seat of the Supreme Court of the United States

Legal offices
Preceded by Lenore Carrero Nesbitt	Judge of the United States District Court for the Southern District of Florida; 1999–2012	Succeeded by Robin L. Rosenberg
Preceded by Susan H. Black	Judge of the United States Court of Appeals for the Eleventh Circuit; 2012–present	Incumbent
