= Thomas Alonzo Clark =

American judge (1920–2005)

Senior Judge of the United States Court of Appeals for the Eleventh Circuit
- In office August 31, 1991 – September 4, 2005

Judge of the United States Court of Appeals for the Eleventh Circuit
- In office October 1, 1981 – August 31, 1991
- Appointed by: operation of law
- Preceded by: Seat established
- Succeeded by: Susan H. Black

Judge of the United States Court of Appeals for the Fifth Circuit
- In office November 2, 1979 – October 1, 1981
- Appointed by: Jimmy Carter
- Preceded by: Seat established by 92 Stat. 1629
- Succeeded by: Seat abolished

Personal details
- Born: Thomas Alonzo Clark; December 20, 1920 Atlanta, Georgia
- Died: September 4, 2005 (aged 84) Vero Beach, Florida
- Education: Washington and Lee University (BS); University of Georgia School of Law (LLB)

Thomas Alonzo Clark (December 20, 1920 – September 4, 2005) was a United States circuit judge of the United States Court of Appeals for the Fifth Circuit and later the United States Court of Appeals for the Eleventh Circuit.

== Education and career ==
Born on December 20, 1920, in Atlanta, Georgia, Clark received a Bachelor of Science degree from Washington and Lee University in 1942 and was in the United States Naval Reserve during World War II, from 1942 to 1946. He received a Bachelor of Laws from the University of Georgia School of Law in 1949, and was in private practice in Bainbridge, Georgia from 1949 to 1955, in Americus, Georgia from 1955 to 1957, and in Tampa, Florida, from 1957 to 1979. He was also an instructor at Georgia Southwestern College from 1956 to 1957.

== Federal judicial service ==
On August 28, 1979, Clark was nominated by President Jimmy Carter to a new seat on the United States Court of Appeals for the Fifth Circuit created by 92 Stat. 1629. He was confirmed by the United States Senate on October 31, 1979, and received his commission on November 2, 1979. On October 1, 1981, Clark was reassigned by operation of law to the United States Court of Appeals for the Eleventh Circuit. He assumed senior status on August 31, 1991, serving in that capacity until his death on September 4, 2005, in Vero Beach, Florida, from complications of Alzheimer's disease.

== Sources ==
Legal offices
Preceded by Seat established by 92 Stat. 1629	Judge of the United States Court of Appeals for the Fifth Circuit; 1979–1991	Succeeded by Seat abolished
Preceded by Seat established	Judge of the United States Court of Appeals for the Eleventh Circuit; 1981–1991	Succeeded by Susan H. Black
