= St. Brendan High School =

Private, coeducational school in Westchester, Florida, United States

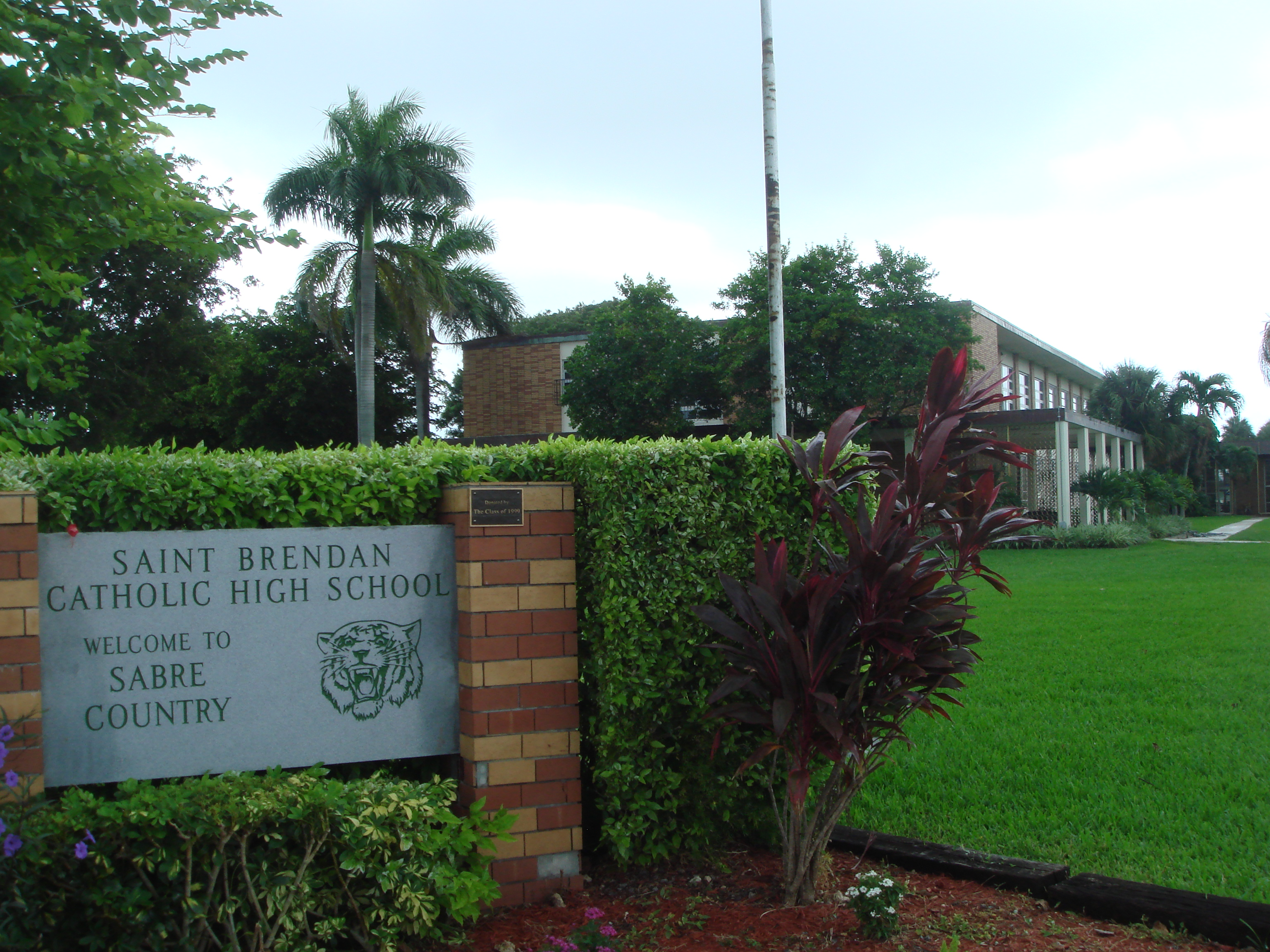
- St Brendan High School, Westchester, Florida

Location
- 2950 SW 87th Avenue; Westchester, (Miami-Dade County), Florida 33165; United States; 25°44′33″N 80°20′14″W

Information
- Type: Private, Coeducational
- Religious affiliations: Roman Catholic, Marist Brothers
- Patron saint: St. Brendan the Navigator
- Opened: 1975
- Founder: Thomas A. Dennehy
- School district: Archdiocese of Miami Department of Schools
- Principal: Ivette Alvarez
- Teaching staff: 73.6 (on an FTE basis)
- Grades: 9-12
- Campus size: 33 acres shared with St. John Vianney College Seminary
- Colors: Green & White
- Team name: Sabres
- Accreditation: Southern Association of Colleges and Schools
- Newspaper: Sabre Press
- Tuition: $12,500 plus fees (2021-2022)
- Website: www.stbrendanhigh.org

St. Brendan High School is a co-educational private Catholic high school in the Westchester census-designated place in Miami-Dade County, Florida. The school is part of the Archdiocese of Miami.

== History ==
St. Brendan High School was originally St. John Vianney Minor Seminary High School, which opened in 1959 to accept students who were interested in studying for the priesthood. When enrollment declined, the Roman Catholic Archdiocese of Miami, decided to convert the school into a co-educational high school. They changed its name to St. Brendan High School and it opened at the start of the 1975 school year.

It is part of the Archdiocese of Miami. The school is primarily committed to serving the educational needs of the Catholic population of the southwest section of Miami. In 1975, 346 students were enrolled in the ninth and tenth grades. By 1977, 870 students were enrolled in the ninth, tenth, eleventh, and twelfth grades.

== Athletics ==
The following sports are offered at St. Brendan:

- Basketball
- Baseball
- Cheerleading
- Cross Country
- Soccer
- Softball
- Swimming
- Tennis
- Track & Field
- Volleyball
- Lacrosse
- Football
- Dance

== Notable alumni ==
- Antonietta Collins, sportscaster, ESPN's SportsCenter
- Jose Felix Diaz, former Florida State Representative
- Bob Ducsay, film editor and producer
- Adalberto Jordan, judge on United States Court of Appeals for the Eleventh Circuit
- Natalie Martinez, actress
- Marilyn Milian, The People's Court
- Jackie Nespral, journalist
- Jenny Lorenzo, actress

== See also ==
- Christopher Columbus High School (Miami-Dade County)
