= Wilkie D. Ferguson =

American judge

Wilkie D. Ferguson Jr.
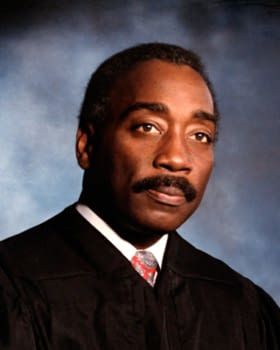

Judge of the United States District Court for the Southern District of Florida
- In office November 22, 1993 – June 9, 2003
- Appointed by: Bill Clinton
- Preceded by: William Hoeveler
- Succeeded by: Marcia G. Cooke

Personal details
- Born: May 11, 1938 Miami, Florida, U.S.
- Died: June 9, 2003 (aged 65) Miami, Florida, U.S.
- Education: Florida A&M University (BS); Howard University School of Law (JD)

Wilkie Demeritte Ferguson Jr. (May 11, 1938 – June 9, 2003) was an American lawyer and judge. He served as a United States district judge of the United States District Court for the Southern District of Florida, as well as serving on the Florida Third District Court of Appeal and the 11th Judicial Circuit Court of Florida.

== Early life ==
Ferguson was born in Miami, Florida, to Bahamian immigrants. He grew up in the Liberty Square public housing project in Miami, attending segregated public schools. He was a member of the first graduating class of Miami Northwestern High School in 1956.

== Education and career ==
Ferguson graduated from the Florida A&M University with a Bachelor of Science degree in business administration in 1960. At FAMU he met his wife, Betty, who later became a member of the Miami-Dade County Commission. After graduation, Ferguson enlisted in the United States Army and served from 1960 to 1964. He attained the rank of second lieutenant, serving as a paratrooper and infantry units at Fort Benning in 1961. Ferguson was discharged from active duty in 1964 but remained in the Army Reserve as a captain from 1964 to 1968. Ferguson worked as an accountant in Philadelphia and took graduate courses at Drexel University before entering Howard University School of Law. Ferguson served as associate editor of The Barrister, the Howard University School of Law newspaper. He received his Juris Doctor in 1968.

Ferguson served as a staff attorney of Legal Services of Greater Miami from 1968 to 1970, and from the Liberty City-Brownsville Legal Services office from 1969 to 1971. Ferguson was a member of the panel that investigated the 1968 Liberty City riots. He was in private practice in Miami from 1970 to 1973, and co-founded the firm of McCrary, Ferguson and Lee in 1971. Ferguson was a staff attorney of the Dade County School Board from 1972 to 1973.

== State judicial service ==
Between 1973 and 1977, Ferguson served on the Industrial Claims Court. In 1976, Governor Rubin Askew appointed Ferguson to the 11th Judicial Circuit Court of Florida (Dade County Circuit Court) from 1977 to 1981; he was the first black judge appointed to that court. Ferguson was appointed the Florida Third District Court of Appeal in December 1980 and served on that court from 1981 to 1993; he was the first black judge on that court.

== Federal judicial service ==
Ferguson was nominated by President Bill Clinton to the United States District Court for the Southern District of Florida on October 25, 1993, to the seat vacated by William Hoeveler. Confirmed by the Senate on November 20, 1993, he received commission on November 22, 1993. Ferguson served on the court until he died of leukemia in Miami in 2003. He was succeeded by Judge Marcia G. Cooke.

== Honors ==
Just ten days after his death the Florida Black Lawyers Association voted unanimously to rename itself the Wilkie D. Ferguson, Jr. Bar Association in his honor. The Wilkie D. Ferguson Courthouse in downtown Miami, designed by Arquitectonica, as well as the nearby Metromover station (formerly the Arena/State Plaza station as of February 2012), are also named for Ferguson.

== See also ==
- List of African-American federal judges
- List of African-American jurists
- List of first minority male lawyers and judges in Florida

Legal offices
Preceded by William Hoeveler	Judge of the United States District Court for the Southern District of Florida; 1993–2003	Succeeded by Marcia G. Cooke
