= Zantac settlements =

Ranitidine, a heartburn medicine sold under the brand name Zantac among others, was pulled from shelves in 2019, following disclosure of potential carcinogenic effects, which its manufacturers were accused of "engaging in a decades-long scheme to conceal."

By 2020, the US Food and Drug Administration was telling consumers to discard whatever Zantac they still had.

== Overview ==
Zantac was first marketed in 1981, and it was described in 1989 as "one of the most expensive drugs on the market", and "the world's biggest-selling prescription drug". Addiction to taking it ("a habit") was how some of its users described Zantac. The focus of Glaxo, its manufacturer, was to gain market share "from Zantac competitors like Tagamet." Cimetidine, sold under the brand name Tagamet among others, was listed in 2020 as an alternative to Zantac.

The company also introduced a half-strength line extension named Zantac 75.The Los Angeles Times headlined "Public Faces Overdose of Similar Drug Names."

The market for Zantac and its competitors was described in 2005 as 13.5 billion US dollars.

The product's problem was described by The New York Times as being "that a potential cancer-causing contaminant can build up in the drug when stored for long periods." Heavy marketing expenditures resulted in Zantac being consumed by those who might have satisficed with less harmful alternatives. As the potential harmful effects were identified, lawsuits were filed.

== Oversight ==
By the time of the FDA's 1983 provisional approval for Zantac, it had already been approved for sale in 31 countries. Marketing expenditures were measured by hundreds of millions of dollars.

The 2019 New York Times headline "Heartburn Drugs Can Lead to Fatal Heart or Kidney Disease" was a herald for Zantac being pulled from store shelves.

=== Infants and children ===
A lower dose version of Zantac had been given to children. A liquid form for ingestion by infants also had been marketed.

== Lawsuits ==
By 2022, a wave of US class action lawsuits was underway. Also by then, "a wave of recalls" had taken place.

Some of the lawsuits, which by October 2021 included over 100,000 plaintiffs, were filed due to impending statute of limitations laws; estimates of how many people used Zantac have been given as high as 15 million. Facets of the legal wrangling included:

- whether or not certain internal eMails were privileged (and whether deleting them was a violation of a judge's orders to preserve them).
- voluntary withdrawal of products and whether this removed them from oversight.

In June 2023, GSK reached a confidential settlement for one of the lawsuits related to Zantac causing cancer. After the announcement of the settlement, GSK's stock price rose by 4.8%

== Zantac pill switching settlements ==
In 2008 settlements were reached regarding Walgreens and CVS switching Medicaid patients taking Zantac from capsules to the "more costly" tablet form.

== See also ==
- Zantac 360 (Famotidine)
- List of largest pharmaceutical settlements
