= Cuban-American Bar Association =

- Abbreviation: CABA
- Formation: 1974; 51 years ago
- Founded at: Miami, Florida
- Headquarters: Florida
- Official language: English, Spanish
- President: Javier A. Ley-Soto
- Co-Vice Presidents: Haydee Sera, Jordi Martinez-Cid
- Treasurer: Daniel Buigas
- Secretary: Candice Balmori
- Board of directors: Diana Arteaga, Emily Balter, Gustavo Ceballos, Patrick Montoya, Isis Pacheco Velasco, Joshua Padron, Augusto Perera, Fabian Ruiz
- Website: https://cabaonline.com/

The Cuban American Bar Association (CABA) was established in Miami in 1974 by a group of 20 or so Cuban attorneys adapting in a different culture. CABA is a non-profit voluntary bar association in the State of Florida. CABA's members include judges, lawyers and law students of Cuban, Cuban-American descent, as well as those who are not of Cuban descent, but are interested in issues affecting the Cuban community.

In 1994, a group of CABA attorneys traveled to Cuba to expedite the legal rights of detained Cuban rafters caught in political limbo. The attorneys contributed more than 5,000 hours representing the refugees, pleading their cause before U.S. government authorities and visiting Guantanamo to ensure they were receiving fair and adequate treatment. Founders include Mario P. Goderich, now a judge on the Third District Court of Appeals, and Carlos Benito Fernandez, father of Katherine Fernandez Rundle, Dade County state attorney. CABA is one of the larger voluntary bars in Florida with over 1,300 members. . Activities of the association include an annual program in cooperation with the Hispanic National Bar Association; a scholarship program for law students funded by an annual golf tournament; the "CABA Smoker," a networking fundraiser honoring Cuba's cigar-making tradition. ; and the pro bono project in conjunction with the Dade County Bar. CABA maintains campus affinity group law student chapters at multiple universities including Cornell, University of Miami School of Law, NSU Shepard Broad College of Law, and Florida State University College of Law
