= Ohio Commodore =

Highest civic honor awarded by the US state of Ohio

Executive Order of the Ohio Commodore

Awarded by Ohio
- Type: State order
- Established: 1966
- Country: United States
- Seat: Buckeye Lake, Ohio
- Eligibility: Civilian
- Criteria: Recognition for outstanding contributions to economic development.
- Status: Honorary
- Founder: Governor James A. Rhodes

Statistics
- First induction: 1966
- Last induction: Current
- Total inductees: Over 600

Ohio Commodore is Ohio's highest honor and an honorary title bestowed upon individuals by the governor of Ohio in recognition for outstanding contributions to economic development. It is not a military rank and has no association with the Ohio Naval Militia. Ohio Commodores have served as international trade mission participants, received international delegations, and acted as the Governor's honor guard at official events.

== Organizational history and Leadership ==
Founded by Ohio Governor James A. Rhodes in 1966 during a ceremony at the Perry Monument at Put-In Bay. Named for the hero of the Battle of Lake Erie in 1813, Commodore Oliver Hazard Perry, Governor Rhodes established the Executive Order of the Ohio Commodores (which encompasses membership in the Association) to honor 60 Ohio businessmen who accompanied him on Ohio's first international trade mission. Since then, over 600 men and women have been appointed to the Executive Order of the Ohio Commodore as recognition of their contributions to economic development in their communities, and to the State of Ohio.

The Association of Ohio Commodores is led by an executive committee, sub-committees, board of trustees, and four regional directors. The executive committee is composed of a Grand Commodore, Fleet Commodore, Purser, and the immediate Past Grand Commodore. The current Grand Commodore is David W. Johnson.

== Awards ==
The Commodores Captains Award is presented to those who have contributed to the organization above and beyond the expected participation.

The Elite Corps are individuals who have brought honor and dignity to themselves and their home state of Ohio.

The James A. Rhodes Service award is given to individuals whose services to Ohio have "followed in the footsteps of Governor Rhodes". James Rhodes was an American Republican politician from Ohio that served four full terms in office.

== Charitable and business development activities ==
Since 1984, the Commodores have held a yearly fundraiser, and in recent years have been a primary sponsor of the Governor's Excellence in Exporting Awards. These awards honor Ohio companies or institutions that have created jobs and improved their local economies through international trade.

The Association of Ohio Commodores Foundation Fund was established at the Foundation for Appalachian Ohio in August, 2019 to support the charitable, educational, and public purposes of the Association of Ohio Commodores. The fund awards charitable grants, including a $26,900 grant in 2022 to Dolly Parton’s Imagination Library of Ohio.

The Ohio Commodores Scholarship Fund is certified by the Ohio Attorney General as a Scholarship Granting Organization. The fund awards academic scholarships to students across Ohio attending primary and secondary schools (K-12), giving priority to students with the greatest financial need.

== Commodores ==
Below is a partial list of notable Ohio Commodores:

- Albert M. Covelli, II
- Sam Covelli, previous Grand Commodore
- Bret Dixon
- David W. Johnson, current Grand Commodore
- Mike DeWine, Ohio Governor
- Christopher Che
- Paul R. Bishop
- O'dell Owens
- John D. Clark Sr.
- Penny J. Traina
- Urban Meyer
- Jane Timken

== See also ==
- Commodore

== See also ==
- Title of honor
- Other honorary titles in U.S. states:
  - Arkansas Traveler
  - Colonel (U.S. honorary title)
  - Delaware title of Order of the First State of Delaware
  - Kentucky Colonel
  - Indiana title of Sagamore of the Wabash
  - Nebraska Admiral, formally Admiral in the Great Navy of the State of Nebraska
  - North Carolina title of Order of the Long Leaf Pine
  - Rhode Island Commodore
  - South Carolina titles of Order of the Palmetto and Order of the Silver Crescent
  - Texas title of Admiral in the Texas Navy
  - Washington State Leadership Board, formerly known as the Association of Washington Generals
- Great Floridians
