= O'dell Owens =

American physician (1947–2022)

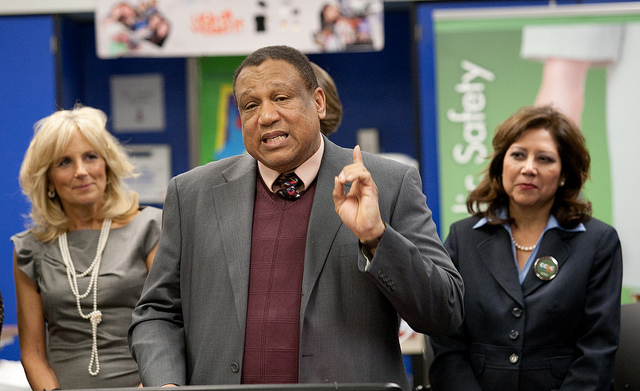
- Owens as the president of Cincinnati State Technical and Community College in 2012

Interim Cincinnati Health Commissioner
- In office June 2016 – September 14, 2016
- Preceded by: Noble Maseru
- Succeeded by: Marilyn Crumpton (interim)

Medical Director of the Cincinnati Health Department
- In office September 2015 – September 14, 2016
- Preceded by: Lawrence Holditch

Hamilton County Coroner
- In office January 2005 – November 10, 2010
- Preceded by: Carl Parrott
- Succeeded by: Anant Bhati

Personal details
- Born: O'dell Moreno Owens; December 1947 Cincinnati, Ohio, U.S.
- Died: November 23, 2022 (aged 74) Cincinnati, Ohio, U.S.
- Party: Democratic
- Spouse: Marchelle Owens (m. 1976)
- Children: 3
- Education: Antioch College; Yale School of Medicine

O'dell Moreno Owens (December 1947 – November 23, 2022) was an American physician, public health official, educator, and health advocate. He was nationally known for his work in in vitro fertilization.

== Early life and education ==
Owens was born Odell Owens in 1947 in the West End neighborhood of Cincinnati, Ohio. He was the second-oldest of seven children of O'dell Owens and Angelita Moreno Owens. They lived in poverty in a house owned by his grandmother. His mother died of a stroke when he was 12 years old. In 1960, Owens's grandmother was forced to sell the house to the city, as part of the city's demolition plans under the Cincinnati Metropolitan Master Plan; the money was used for a down payment on a house in North Avondale. Owens flunked out of his eighth grade year at Walnut Hills High School due to repeated absences while working odd jobs and caring for his siblings. In 1963, the elder Owens moved the family to Detroit, due to the difficulty of raising seven children while unemployed. He left O'dell in the care of Clinton and Cathryn Buford, whose two sons O'dell had been babysitting.

Owens graduated from Woodward High School and went on to attend Antioch College in Yellow Springs. In 1969, he spent a year as an exchange student at Makerere University in Kampala. He earned a bachelor's degree from Antioch in 1971. He earned a medical degree and Master of Public Health from the Yale School of Medicine. He began his residency in obstetrics and gynecology in 1976 and served as chief resident at Yale from 1979 to 1980, followed by a two-year fellowship in reproductive endocrinology and infertility at Harvard Medical School.

== Career ==
In 1982, Owens returned to Cincinnati as the head of the reproductive division at the University of Cincinnati Medical Center, founding its fertility clinic in 1985. As Cincinnati's first reproductive endocrinologist, he performed the city's first in vitro fertilization and, in 1986, its first pregnancy from a frozen embryo. In 1995, he helped doctors at the Cincinnati Zoo and Botanical Garden conceive the first gorilla in vitro. He also served as director of endocrinology and infertility at The Christ Hospital. He later left his medical practice to become medical director for UnitedHealth Group#UnitedHealthcare of Ohio and to help found RISE Learning Solutions, a non-profit organization that focuses on early childhood education training technology.

A Democrat, Owens won election to Hamilton County Coroner in 2004, becoming the first African American to serve in an executive office in the county's history. He adopted a policy of visiting any police investigation involving a homicide and ended his department's involvement in private autopsies, directing resources instead to performing autopsies for surrounding counties in Ohio and Indiana. In 2006, he campaigned with Prosecuting Attorney Joe Deters and Sheriff Simon L. Leis Jr. in support of a tax levy to fund a new county jail, a measure that was controversial among Black voters. He was publicly critical of the LifeCenter Organ Donor Network, an organ procurement organization that operates in Ohio. In 2008, Owens won reelection with the most votes ever cast for a candidate in Hamilton County history. During his terms in office, he gave a thousand talks to local leaders about social equity and 180 talks to local students about life choices, arguing that an increased high school graduation rate would lead to a decreased homicide rate.

In 2010, Owens became president of Cincinnati State Technical and Community College. He oversaw the opening of a satellite campus in Middletown. On September 23, 2015, he resigned from his position at the school, citing disagreements with the board of trustees. The same month, he was hired by the Cincinnati Health Department as its medical director. In June 2016, he became interim health commissioner when Dr. Noble Maseru retired from the department. On September 14, 2016, Owens resigned to become president and CEO of Interact for Health, a Norwood-based non-profit organization that promotes public health. He led Interact for Health and its sister organization, InterAct for Change, from October 2016 until his retirement on March 31, 2021. During the COVID-19 pandemic in Ohio, he advised Governor Mike DeWine on equitable vaccine distribution.

Owens was the first African American to sit on the board of the University of Cincinnati. He also sat on a number of other boards, including those of U.S. Bancorp, the Cincinnati/Northern Kentucky International Airport, the National Underground Railroad Freedom Center, and the Cincinnati Zoo and Botanical Garden's Lindner Center for Conservation and Research of Endangered Wildlife. He has served as president of the International Association of Coroners and Medical Examiners.

== Personal life ==
Owens changed his given name from Odell to O'dell, adding an apostrophe, "to be different". He married Marchelle Owens in 1976 and with her had three children. He lived in Amberley Village.

Owens died on November 22, 2022, at age 74.

== Awards and honors ==
Owens was named a Kentucky Colonel and Ohio Commodore.

In 2021, Owens donated 54 acres (22 ha) to the City of Walton, Kentucky, to be converted to a community park named Dr. O'dell Owens Park. Owens is featured in a mural by Nadyaa Betts on the side of WCET's Crosley Telecommunications Center, in appreciation of his support for the station's annual Action Auction.
