= Colonel (U.S. honorary title) =

Honorary title in the United States

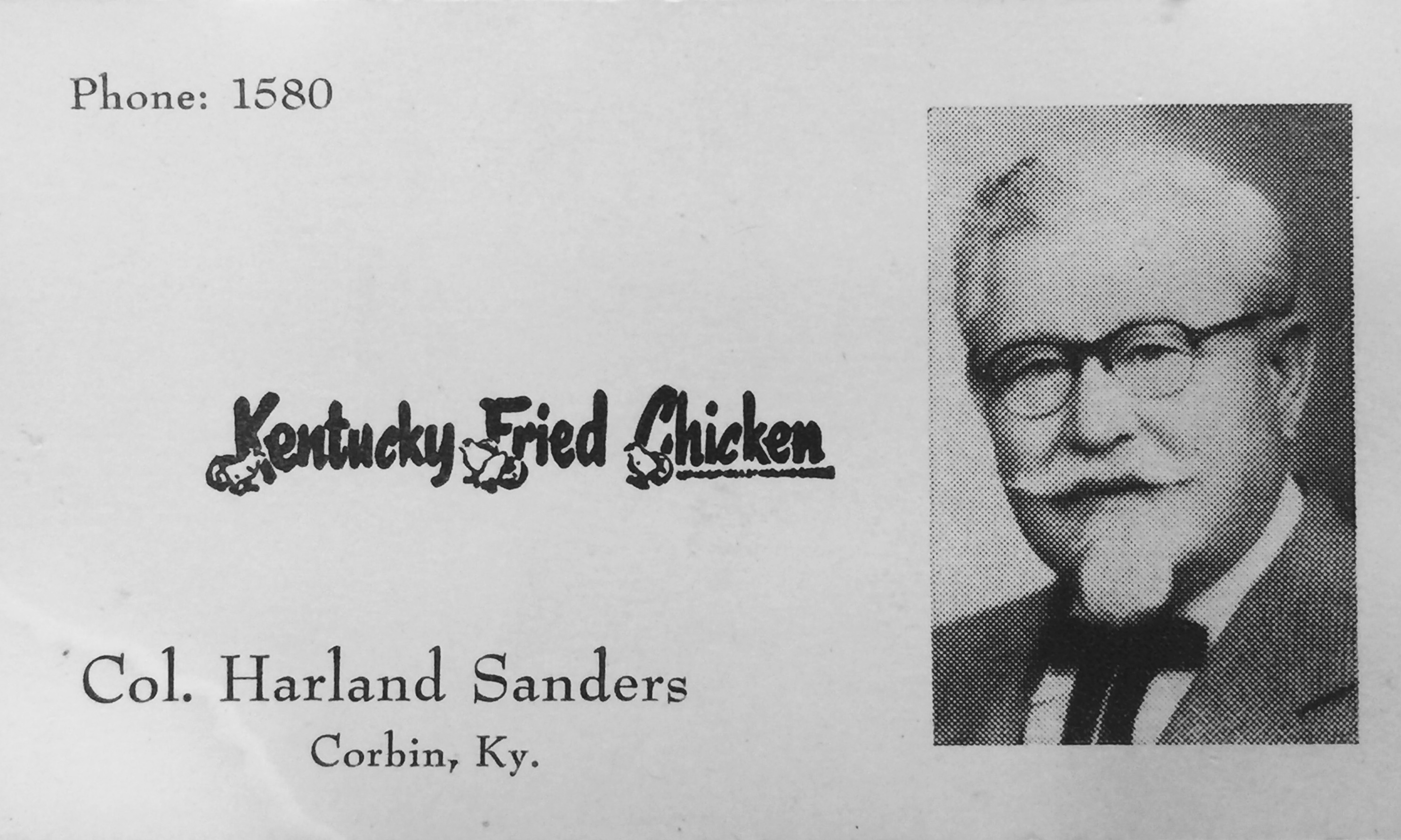
Business card of Harland Sanders, late 1940s; he received the honorary title of "Kentucky Colonel" in 1935 from Governor Ruby Laffoon.

The honorable title prefix and style of "Colonel" is designated legally for various reasons by US governors in common law to citizens, employees, travelers and visitors within their states. The origins of the titular colonelcy can be traced back to colonial and antebellum times when men of the landed gentry were given the title to commission companies or for financing the local militias without actual expectations of command. This practice can be traced back to the English Renaissance when a colonelcy was purchased by a lord or prominent gentleman but the actual command would fall to a lieutenant colonel, who would deputize its members for the proprietor.

There is an aristocratic tinge to the social usage of the title "Colonel", which most often today designates a Southern gentleman, and is archetypal of the Southern aristocrat from days past. There is also a different perceptive level of respect for colonels that are reciprocally addressed as "Honorable" or "Colonel" in writing style. While the honor of colonel in the civil usage has no actual military role, the title did evolve from the military.

== By state ==
The US states that have conferred this title as an honor within the last half-century are Alabama, Georgia, Kentucky, Louisiana, Mississippi, New Mexico, New York, North Dakota, Oklahoma, South Carolina, Tennessee and Utah. Some of the titles hold different levels of authority and some expire at the end of the term of the governor. The most popular and widely awarded type of colonelcy is the "Kentucky Colonel".

- Alabama Colonel – Alabama honor specifically makes one a colonel in the state militia.
- Georgia Colonel – Georgia's honorary title give its members a rank as aides-de-camp on the governor's staff codified in Official Code of Georgia Annotated 38-2-111;
  - second to it is the rank of Georgia Lieutenant-Colonel
- Kentucky Colonel
- Tennessee Colonel – The highest honor of Tennessee is "Colonel, Aide-de-camp". Those who receive this award are recorded by the Secretary of State of Tennessee with those who have been commissioned into the State Guard and Tennessee National Guard.
- Utah - the "Honorary Colonel's Corps of Utah" is a position offered to those who "promote the objectives" of the Utah National Guard; nominees can be military personnel or civilians.

Defunct or inactive examples include:

- Texas once bestowed the honor as well. Texas Colonelcy was replaced with the honor of Admiral in the Texas Navy.
- From 2005 to 2015 Illinois allowed for the Governor of the State to make appointments to the Governor's Regiment of Colonels, but no appointments were ever made.
- Many states have provisions in their articles or bills concerning state defense forces which allow the governor to grant honorary membership of the officer ranks or granting honorary colonelcy to civilians in the common law of Colonial America.

== Notable uses ==
There are over 1,000 businesses in the United States that use or have used the term "colonel" as part of their corporate name.

"The Colonel" is also often a shorthand reference to restaurateur Colonel Harland David Sanders, the founder of the Kentucky Fried Chicken ("KFC") chain of franchised restaurants, whom Ruby Laffoon, Governor of the Commonwealth of Kentucky, commissioned a Kentucky colonel in 1935. There are well over 300 major celebrities that have been recognized with colonelcy; many of them never use the title.

Another famous "colonel" was Colonel Tom Parker, Elvis Presley's manager, who received his title from Governor Jimmie Davis of Louisiana as a reward for Parker's help in Davis's political campaign to be elected governor.

Col. Edward Mandell House was an American diplomat, and an advisor to President Woodrow Wilson. He was known by the nickname "Colonel House", although he had performed no military service as a Texas Colonel. He was a highly influential back-stage politician in Texas before becoming a key supporter of the presidential bid of Wilson in 1912.

Many other prominent people in the South used the title dating back to before the American Revolutionary War, the title was used frequently in all of the Thirteen Colonies.

== See also ==
- Title of honor
- Other honorary titles in U.S. states:
  - Arkansas Traveler
  - Delaware title of Order of the First State of Delaware
  - Kentucky Colonel
  - Indiana title of Sagamore of the Wabash
  - Nebraska Admiral, formally Admiral in the Great Navy of the State of Nebraska
  - North Carolina title of Order of the Long Leaf Pine
  - Ohio Commodore
  - Rhode Island Commodore
  - South Carolina titles of Order of the Palmetto and Order of the Silver Crescent
  - Texas title of Admiral in the Texas Navy
  - Washington State Leadership Board, formerly known as the Association of Washington Generals
