= Mario Rodriguez (Indianapolis Airport Authority) =

Executive Director of the Indianapolis Airport Authority

- Born: New York City, New York
- Education: Engineering degree in Miami University
- Occupation: Executive Director of the Indianapolis Airport Authority

Mario Rodriguez is an American director who currently serves as Executive Director of the Indianapolis Airport Authority.

== History ==
Mario Rodriguez, son of Cuban immigrants, was born in Brooklyn in New York City. He graduated from the University of Miami with a degree in engineering. Rodriguez served on Presidents Barack Obama, Joe Biden, and Donald Trump's DOT's Aviation Consumer Protection Advisory Committees. He also was a part of Federal Aviation Administration's Unmanned Aircraft System Beyond Visual Line-of Sight Aviation Rulemaking Committee, and on the ACI-NA's U.S. Policy Council. He helped develop a plan for the New Orleans Airport before Hurricane Katrina and received New Orleans City Council Proclamation. Rodriguez was part of Indiana Latino Institute (ILI) Board and a founder of the Hispanic Leadership Circle.

== Awards and recognition ==
In 2018, he was rewarded the Sagamore of the Wabash by Eric Holcomb. In 2019, he was rewarded a U.S. Congressional Recognition by André Carson. He received the 2021 Airports Council International – North America Excellence in Visionary Leadership Award. In 2023 Rodriguez was awarded Dynamic Leader of the Year by the Indiana Chamber of Commerce. He was set to receive the International Citizen of the Year in 2024.
