= Doug Hinds =

Doug Hinds may refer to:

- Doug Hinds (athlete)
- Doug Hinds (politician)
