= Arkansas Traveler (honorary title) =

Bestowed by the US state of Arkansas

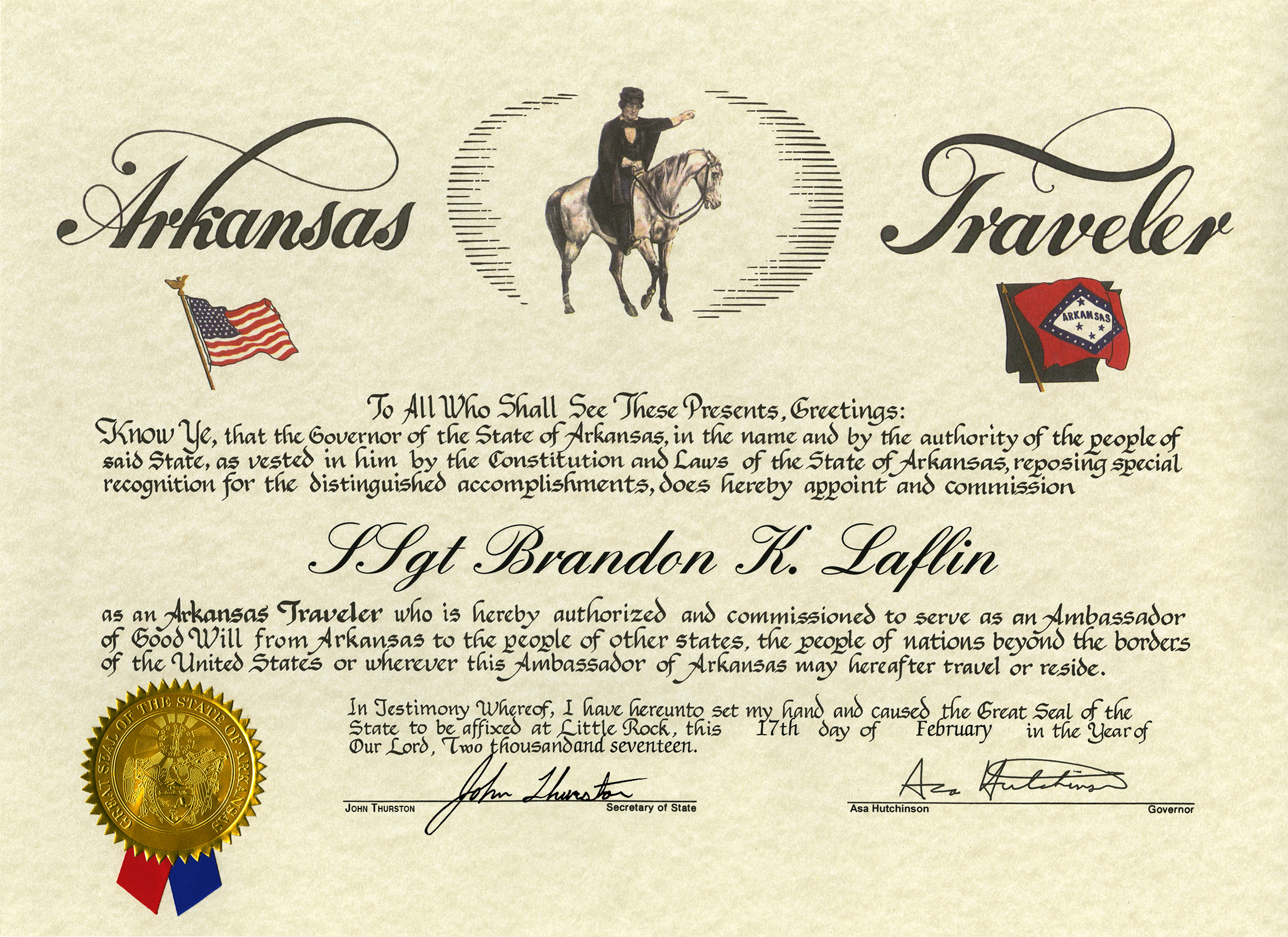
Arkansas Traveler certificate, 2017

The Arkansas Traveler is an honorary title bestowed on notable individuals who, through their actions, serve as goodwill ambassadors for the US state of Arkansas. A certificate is signed by the governor, secretary of state and the recipient's sponsor, and given to the honoree during a ceremony attended by the signers.

== Background ==
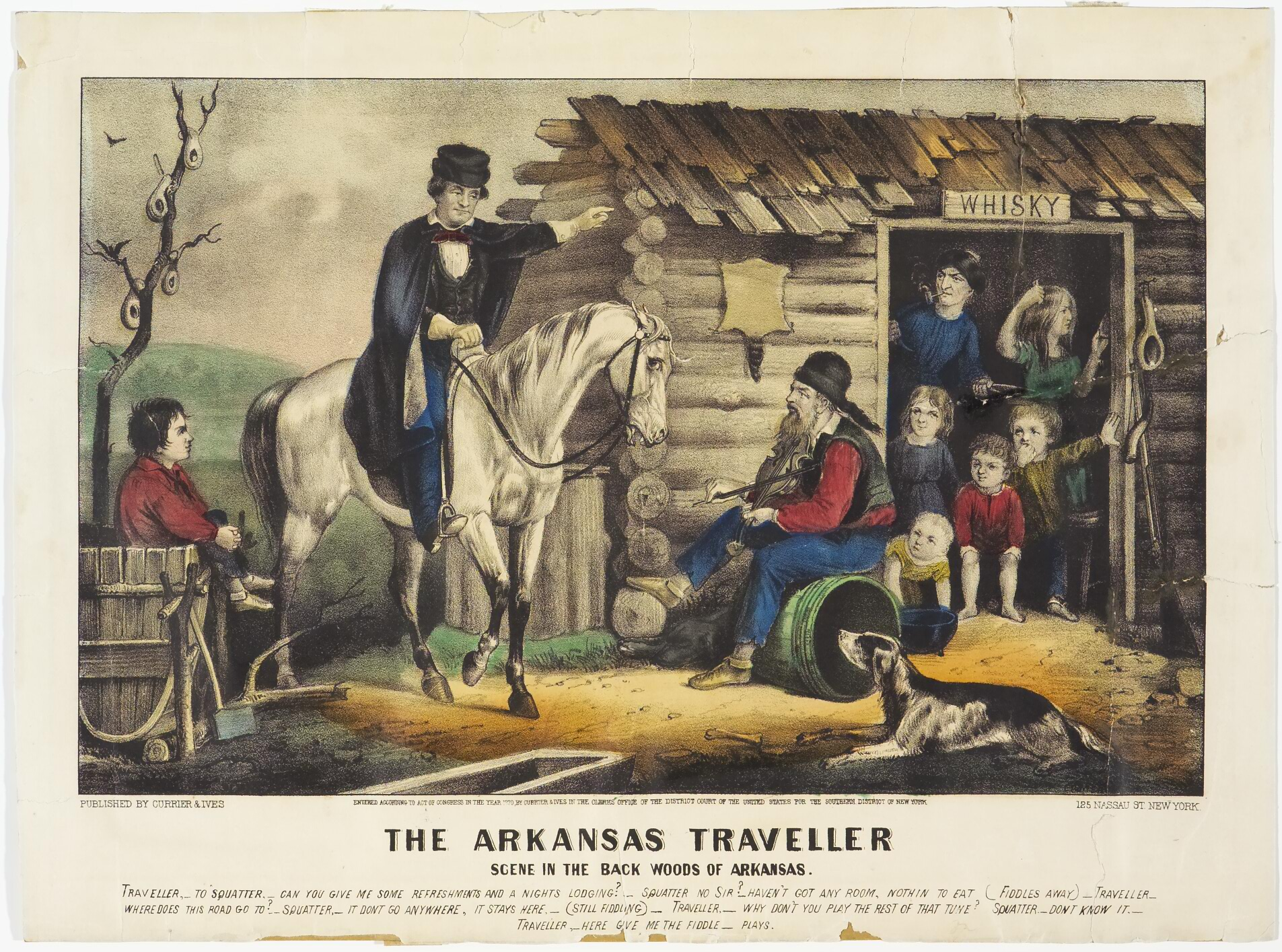
The Arkansas Traveler. Scene in the Back Woods of Arkansas, lithograph by Currier and Ives, 1870

The Arkansas Traveler story is connected to Colonel Sandford C. Faulkner, who was very active in Arkansas politics. He was also involved in banking and farming during the 19th century. As oral history has relayed it, Faulkner had gotten lost in the Ozarks during one of his many political campaigns. Looking for a place to stay overnight, he wandered by a small, log cabin where he was given lodging and hospitality. Faulkner, who was known for retelling the event, explained that the settler was at first bad tempered and uncommunicative but became more welcoming when Faulkner proved able to complete playing the tune that the settler had been playing on the fiddle. Generally when Faulkner told the story, only he and the settler participated in the conversation.

Faulkner's story of the "Arkansas Traveler" rapidly became part of the state's folklore, leading to the creation of a famous painting by Edward Payson Washbourne which depicts the event. Later, in 1870, Currier and Ives created a lithograph of the famous painting. Faulkner was also known to perform the tune often on the fiddle, which he would play as part of his narrative.

== History ==
The award was approved in a resolution by the Arkansas Legislature. The award was created in early 1941 with the first certificate granted May 20, 1941, to President Franklin Delano Roosevelt. While Governor of the state, Bill Clinton conferred the title upon numerous individuals.

== Notable recipients ==
- Muhammad Ali
- Yelda Kuscu Savaskan
- Maya Angelou
- Lucie Arnaz
- Arthur Ashe
- Gene Autry
- Tamar Braxton
- Jan Brewer
- Garth Brooks
- James F. Byrnes
- Cosimo Aldo Cannone
- Matthew Carroll
- Richard Corbett
- Dale Evans
- Steve Forbes
- Norris Goff
- Billy Graham
- Bob Hope
- Chester Lauck
- NJIT baseball team
- Richard Ewing Powell
- Ronald Reagan
- R. J. Reynolds, Jr.
- Roy Rogers
- Franklin D. Roosevelt
- Julia Schramm
- Robert J. Sherman
- Danny Tate
- Thomas J. Watson
- Chandi Prasad Bhatt
- Guy Clark

== See also ==
- Great Floridians (of Florida)
- Nebraska Admiral
- Order of the Long Leaf Pine (of North Carolina)
- Order of the Palmetto (of South Carolina)
- Kentucky Colonel
- Rhode Island Commodore
- Sagamore of the Wabash (of Indiana)
