= John Morton-Finney =

American activist and lawyer (1889–1998)

- Born: Morton Finney; June 25, 1889; Uniontown, Kentucky, U.S.
- Died: January 28, 1998 (aged 108); Indianapolis, Indiana, U.S.
- Resting place: Crown Hill Cemetery and Arboretum, Section 46B, Lot 445, Indianapolis, Indiana; 39.8205672°N 86.1716472°W
- Occupations: Educator, lawyer, and civil rights activist
- Spouse: Pauline Angeline Ray (m. 1921–1975) (her death)
- Children: 1

John Morton-Finney (June 25, 1889 – January 28, 1998) was an American civil rights activist, lawyer, and educator who earned eleven academic degrees, including five law degrees. He spent most of his career as an educator and lawyer after serving from 1911 to 1914 in the U.S. Army as a member of the 24th Infantry Regiment, better known as the Buffalo soldiers, and with the American Expeditionary Forces in France during World War I. Morton-Finney taught languages at Fisk University in Tennessee and at Lincoln University in Missouri, before moving to Indianapolis, Indiana, where he taught in the Indianapolis Public Schools for forty-seven years.

Morton-Finney was a member of the original faculty at Indianapolis's Crispus Attucks High School when it opened in 1927 and later became head of its foreign language department. He also taught at Shortridge High School and at other IPS schools. Morton-Finney was admitted as a member of the Bar of the Indiana Supreme Court in 1935, as a member of the Bar of the U.S. District Court in 1941, and was admitted to practice before the U.S. Supreme Court in 1972.

When Morton-Finney retired from practicing law on June 25, 1996, his 107th birthday, he was believed to have been the oldest practicing attorney in the United States. At the time of his death in 1998 he was Indiana's oldest veteran. Morton-Finney was honored with numerous honorary awards and certificates, including one from the Chief Justice of the United States in 1989, in addition to being commissioned a Kentucky Colonel (1991) from the Governor of Kentucky and named a recipient of a Sagamore of the Wabash award from the Governor of Indiana. He also received distinguished alumni and graduate awards from Indiana University and was inducted into the National Bar Association Hall of Fame (1991). In addition, the Indianapolis Bar Association and Butler University present awards named in his honor.

== Early life and family ==
Born Morton Finney on June 25, 1889, to a former slave father and a free mother, George and Maryatta "Mattie" (Gordon) Finney, in Uniontown, Kentucky, one of seven siblings. After the death of his mother in 1903, his father was unable to care for the children and sent them to live with their grandfather on his farm in Missouri.

Prior to his enlistment in the U.S. Army in 1911, Morton-Finney was enrolled at Lincoln College in Jefferson City, Missouri. After his return to the United States in 1914, Morton-Finney resumed his studies at Lincoln College, where he met and married Pauline Angeline Ray (November 19, 1889 – September 3, 1975) of Geneva, New York. Ray was a graduate of Cornell University and a French teacher at Lincoln College. The couple married in 1921 and moved to Indianapolis, Indiana, the following year. They had a daughter, Gloria Ann Morton-Finney. John and Pauline Morton-Finney were married for more than a half-century until her death in 1975.

== Military service ==
Morton-Finney enrolled at Lincoln College in Missouri, but his education was interrupted by military service. He enlisted in the U.S. Army in 1911, becoming a member of the 24th U.S. Infantry Regiment (a regiment of African American soldiers, better known as Buffalo soldiers) and served in the Philippines. Morton-Finney was promoted to the rank of sergeant, but was denied an officer's commission due to racial discrimination. He received an honorable discharge and returned to the United States in 1914. Morton-Finney also served as an infantryman in the American Expeditionary Force in 1918 in France during World War I. During World War II, he was cited for directing the rationing tickets program for African Americans in Indianapolis.

== Education ==
Morton-Finney had a lifelong interest in education, earning eleven academic degrees in law, French, mathematics, and history. After his military service in the Philippines in 1914, he returned to Lincoln College in Missouri, where he resumed his education and met his wife, Pauline, who was also an educator at the college. His education was disrupted again with military service in 1918, this time serving in France during World War I, but continued following his return to the United States.

Morton-Finney earned a total of five law degrees, the first one from Lincoln College in 1935, followed by law degrees from Indiana Law School and Indiana University in 1944, Indiana University School of Law in 1946, and Martin University in 1995. In addition, he earned master's degrees from Indiana University Bloomington in education (1925) and in French (1933), while at teaching at Crispus Attucks High School in Indianapolis. Morton-Finney also held undergraduate degrees from Lincoln Institute (1920), Iowa State University (1922), and Butler University (1965). Late in life he was awarded a Doctor of Letters (Litt.D.) from Lincoln University (1985), and received an honorary Doctor of Humane Letters degree (L.H.D) from Butler University (1989). Morton-Finney was fluent in French, Latin, Greek, and Spanish, and conversant in German and Portuguese.

== Career ==
=== Educator and administrator ===
Morton-Finney taught languages at Fisk University in Nashville, Tennessee, and at Lincoln University in Jefferson City, Missouri, before moving to Indianapolis, Indiana, in 1922 to teach in the Indianapolis Public Schools. Morton-Finney spent forty-seven years as an IPS teacher and school administrator, beginning at Shortridge High School. He was one of the original faculty members hired for the new Crispus Attucks High School when it opened in 1927. (Attucks High School was the only public high school in Indianapolis designated specifically for African Americans.) Morton-Finney became head of Attucks's foreign language department, taught Greek, Latin, German, Spanish, and French, and later taught at other IPS schools, including junior high mathematics and social studies. He also served as an IPS school principal. In addition, Morton-Finney taught life skills, invited presidents from black colleges to speak to the students, and helped students with college scholarships.

In honor of his nearly five decades of service in the Indianapolis Public Schools, the school district's downtown Center for Education Services building was renamed the Dr. John Morton-Finney Center for Educational Services.

=== Lawyer ===
In addition to his long career as an educator in the Indianapolis public schools, Morton-Finney practiced law in Indiana for many years. He was admitted as a member of the Bar of the Indiana Supreme Court in 1935 and as a member of the Bar of the U.S. District Court in 1941. At the age of 83, Morton-Finney was admitted to practice before the U.S. Supreme Court in 1972. He was inducted into the National Bar Association Hall of Fame in 1991. When Morton-Finney retired from practicing law at the age of 107, he was believed to have been the oldest practicing attorney in the United States.

== Later years ==
Due to his African family's ancestry, ninety-year-old Morton-Finney was crowned Adeniran I, Paramount Chief of Yoruba Descendants in Indiana during ceremonies held at The Children's Museum of Indianapolis on August 31, 1979. Morton-Finney's ancestors migrated from Ethiopia to what is present-day Badagry, Nigeria, from whence some were later transported to America to serve as slaves.

At the age of 96, Morton-Finney was awarded a Doctor of Letters (Litt.D.) from Lincoln University in 1985. He was also the recipient of an honorary Doctor of Humane Letters degree (L.H.D) from Butler University in 1989 at the age of 100.

== Death and legacy ==
Morton-Finney died on January 28, 1998, at the age of 108. He was buried with full military honors at Crown Hill Cemetery in Indianapolis, Indiana. At the time of his death, Morton-Finney was Indiana's oldest veteran.

Morton-Finney was recognized during his lifetime for his public service contributions with honorary awards and certificates from Chief Justice of the U.S. Supreme Court (June 9, 1989), the Indianapolis Public Schools (May 22, 1990), Harvard University, the Indianapolis City Council (1995), and the Mayor of Indianapolis, in addition to being commissioned a Kentucky Colonel (1991) by the Governor of Kentucky and receiving a Sagamore of the Wabash award from the Governor of Indiana. Morton-Finney also received distinguished alumni and graduate awards from Indiana University and was inducted into the National Bar Association Hall of Fame (1991).

In recognition of his years as a legal professional the Indianapolis Bar Association presents awards to local lawyers for their leadership in legal education in Morton-Finney's honor. Butler University presents an award in Morton-Finney's honor to students who demonstrate leadership in promoting "diversity and inclusion in their schools or communities."

== Awards and honors ==
- Crowned Adeniran I, Paramount Chief of Yoruba Descendants in Indiana (1979)
- To honor his lifelong commitment to education and his 47 years with the Indianapolis Public Schools, the IPS board renamed its Center for Education Services to the Dr. John Morton-Finney Center for Educational Services. Commander Carlton Philpot, who was the Chairman of the Buffalo Soldiers Monument committee at Fort Leavenworth, Kansas, was the keynote speaker for the dedication.
- Recipient of Indiana University's College of Arts and Sciences Distinguished Alumni Award (1983)
- Recipient of the Distinguished Graduate, School of Education, Award from the Indiana University Alumni Association (1983)
- Honored at a White House dinner by President George H. W. Bush in 1990.
- Recipient of a Kentucky Colonel Award (1991)
- Inducted into the National Bar Association Hall of Fame (1991)
- Recipient of a Sagamore of the Wabash Award
- Recipient of an honorary doctorate degree from Martin University (1991)
- Named an honorary member of the U.S. 9th and 10th (Horse) Cavalry Association (1995)
- In 1998, Congresswoman Julia Carson made a tribute to Morton-Finney on the floor of the U.S. House of Representatives.
- The Indianapolis Bar Association established the Dr. John Morton-Finney Jr. Award for Excellence in Legal Education in his honor (1998).
- Butler University's Dr. John Morton-Finney Leadership Award to students who have taken a leadership role promoting diversity and inclusion in their schools or communities is named in his honor.
