= Cosimo Aldo Cannone =

Italian racing driver (born 1984)

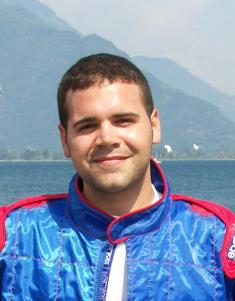
- Nationality: Italian
- Born: 20 March 1984 (age 42) Brindisi, Italy
- Retired: 2009

Powerboating
- Years active: 2003-2009
- Teams: Cannone Racing
- Wins: 13
- Poles: 24
- Fastest laps: 35
- Best finish: 1st in 2007-2008

Previous series
- Endurance World Championship; S1 Class

Cosimo Aldo Cannone (born 20 March 1984) is a retired Italian Endurance S One racing driver who raced for Cannone. He was world champion twice in the pleasure boat endurance category - Class S3 in 2007 and Class S1 in 2008.

Cannone was made a Kentucky Colonel in 2021, in recognition of his charitable works during the COVID-19 pandemic.
