= Voice and Speech Trainers Association =

Non-profit organization

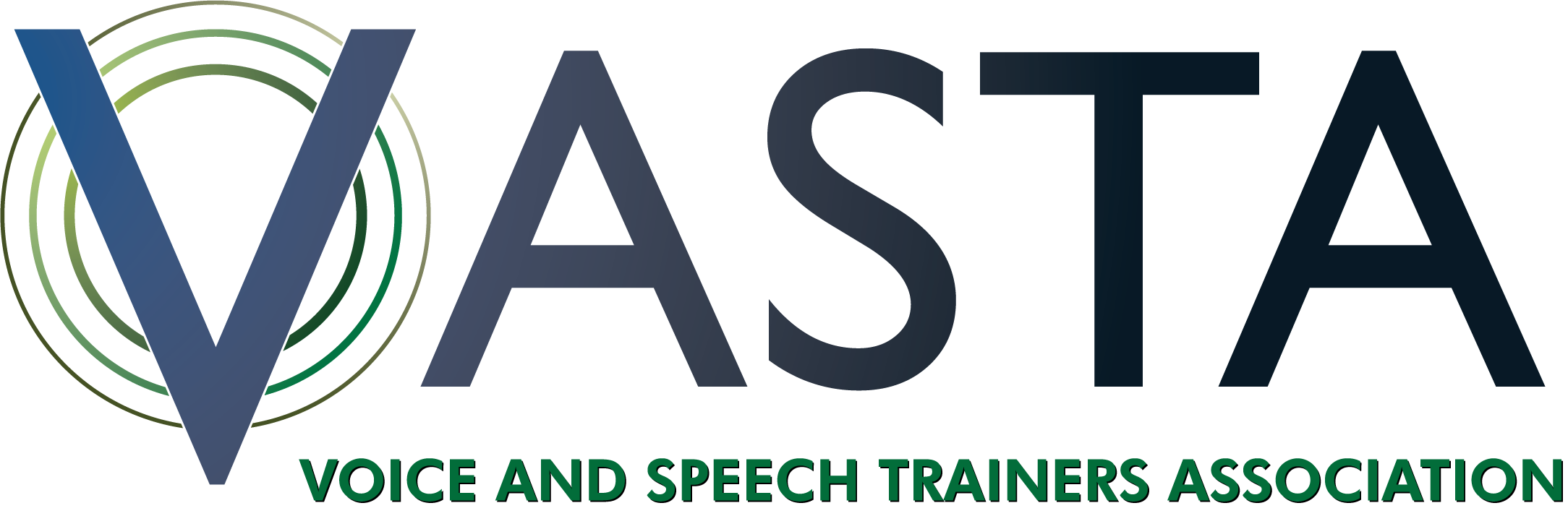

The Voice and Speech Trainers Association (VASTA) is an international non-profit membership organization for voice and speech trainers. It is an international organization whose mission is to advancing and promoting of the voice and speech profession. Founded in 1986, VASTA is both an independent, multidisciplinary organization and a focus group of the Association for Theatre in Higher Education. The first president was Dorothy Runk Mennen.

VASTA offers a number of resources via its website, vasta.org. Its major publication is the Voice and Speech Review (VSR). The VSR was originally published every other year as a monograph. The first four editions were published by Applause and three issues were published by University Publishers; since 2014, it has been published by Routledge as an online journal with three printings per year for VASTA Members. VASTA also has an electronic newsletter, The VASTA Voice, that is published quarterly. The organization offers a number of awards and grants to promote learning and engagement, as well as equity, diversity and inclusion, holds online workshops, and organizes an annual conference.
