= Nebraska Admiral =

Honorary title in Nebraska

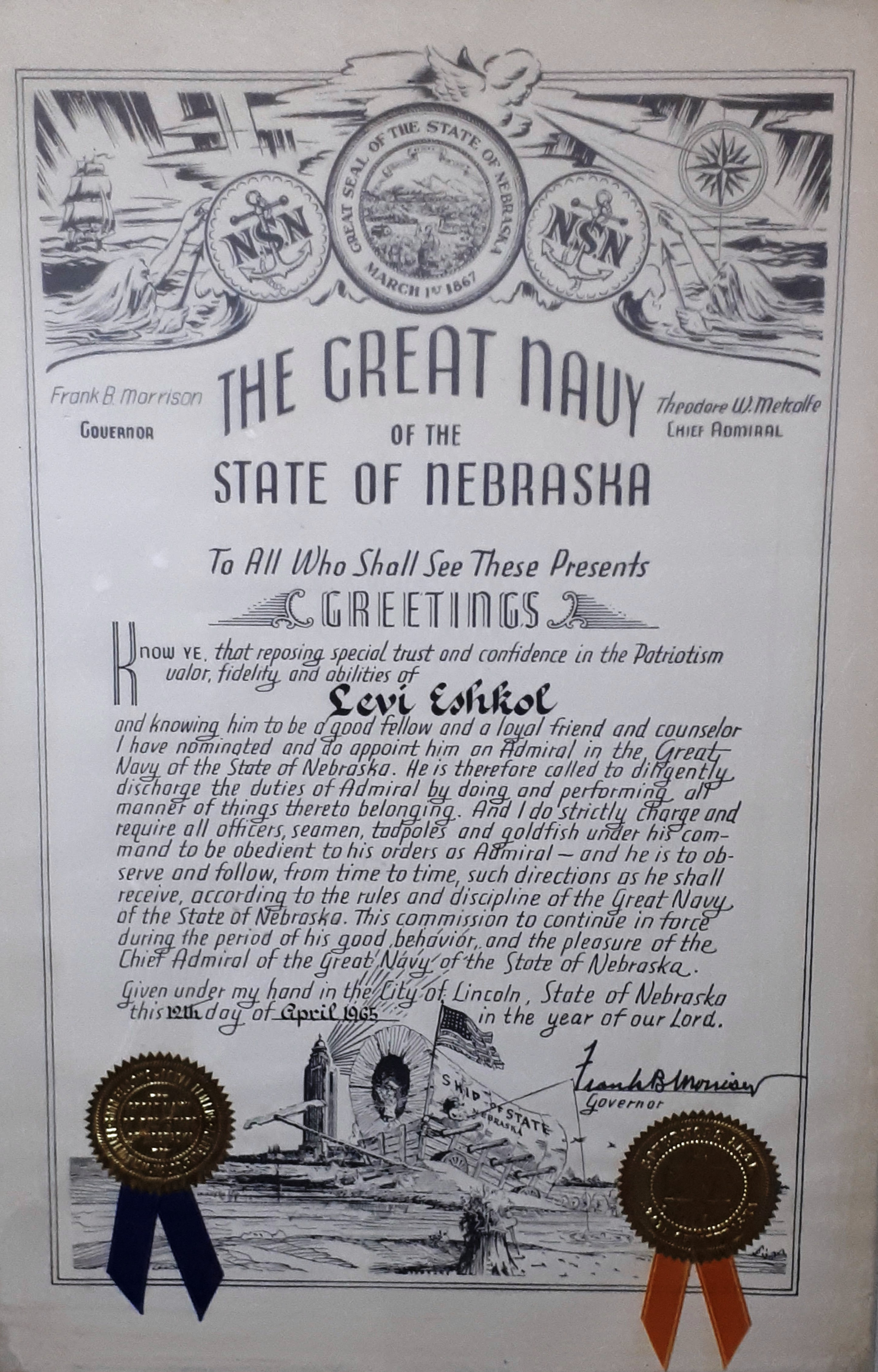
The Great Navy of the State of Nebraska certificate issued to Israeli Prime Minister Levi Eshkol

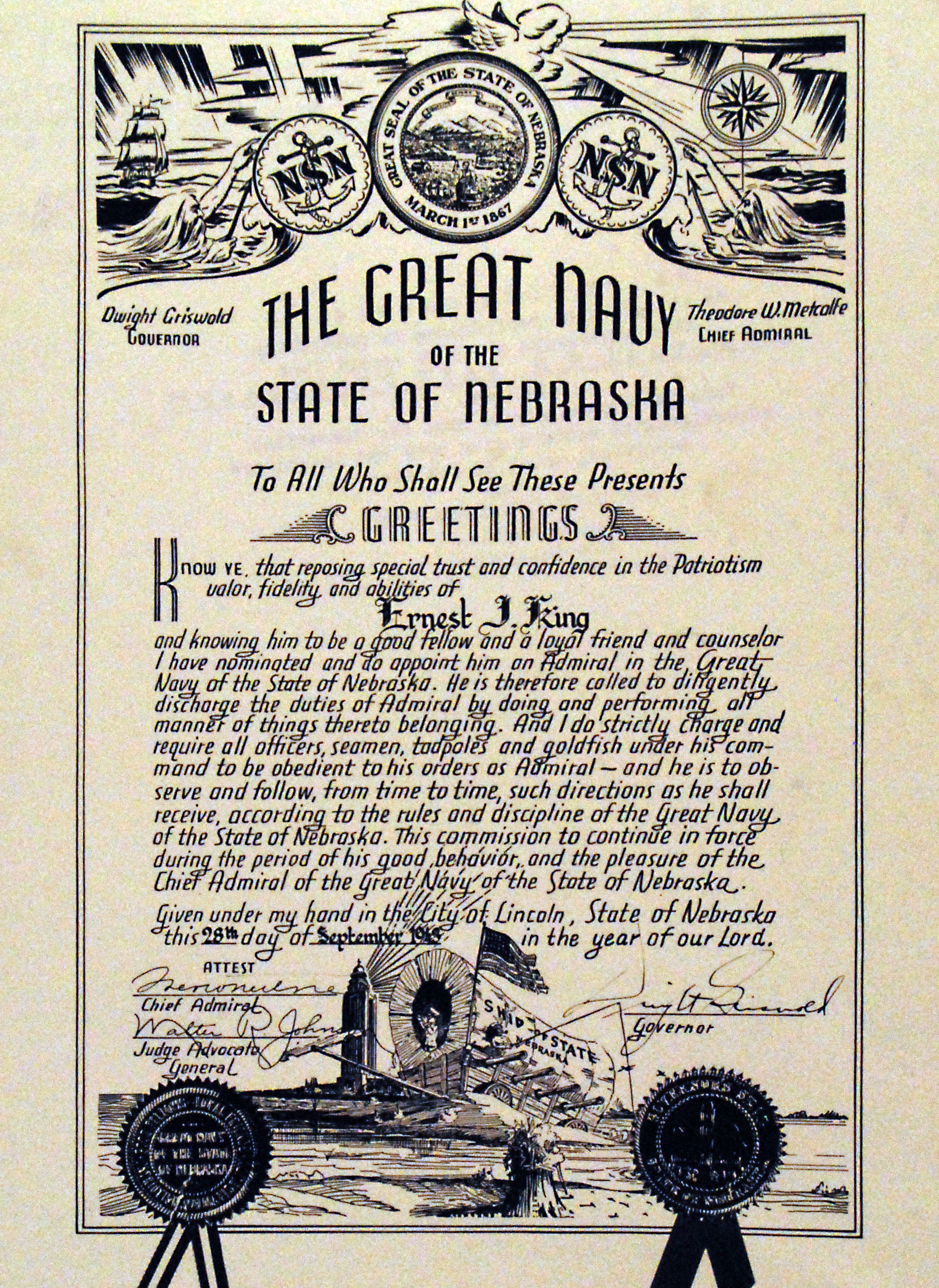
The Great Navy of the State of Nebraska certificate issued to Admiral Ernest J. King, 9th Chief of Naval Operations of the U.S. Navy, in September 1943

Nebraska Admiral (formally, Admiral in the Great Navy of the State of Nebraska) is the state of Nebraska's highest civic honor, and an honorary title bestowed upon individuals by approval of the Governor of Nebraska. It is not a military rank, requires no specific duties, and carries with it no pay or any other compensation. Admirals have the option of joining the Nebraska Admirals Association, a non-profit organization that promotes "The Good Life" of Nebraska.

The award certificate describes the honor in a deliberately tongue-in-cheek fashion:

And I [the Governor of Nebraska] do strictly charge and require all officers, seamen, tadpoles and goldfish under your command to be obedient to your orders as Admiral—and you are to observe and follow, from time to time, such directions you shall receive, according to the rules and discipline of the Great Navy of the State of Nebraska.

The use of the title of admiral, instead of some other high-ranking military title, is a humorous reference to the fact that Nebraska has no navy; only 0.68% of the state is water, the fifth-lowest percentage in the nation. Nebraska relies on the United States Armed Forces for its defense and has had no active state defense force of any sort since 1972. Additionally, Nebraska is the only triple-landlocked state in the nation.

== History ==
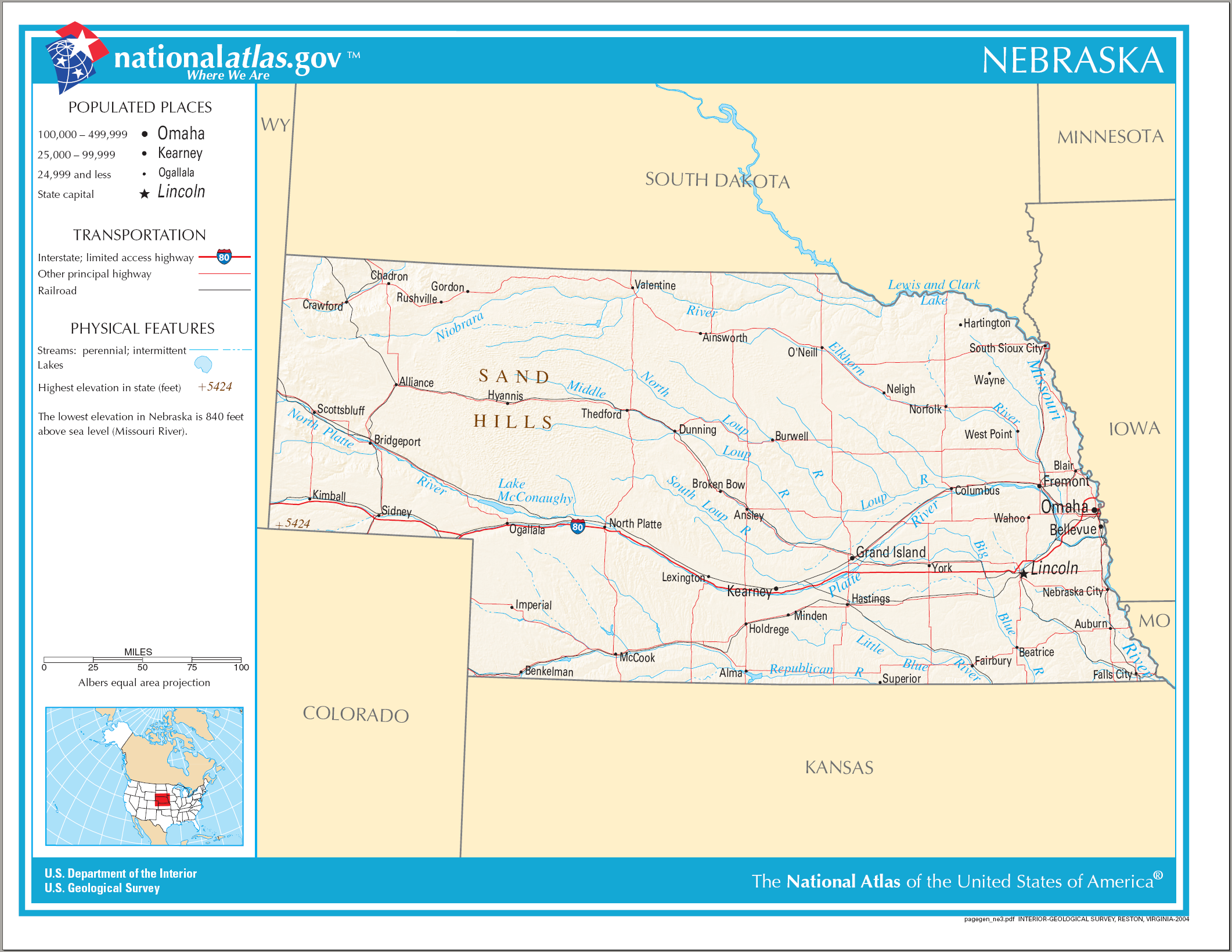
Map showing how Nebraska lacks any access to oceans or large bodies of water

The Great Navy of the State of Nebraska was created in 1931. The Lieutenant Governor of Nebraska at that time, Theodore W. Metcalfe, was serving as Acting Governor of Nebraska while Governor Charles W. Bryan was outside the state. At the urging of some of his friends, he appointed "20 to 25 prominent Nebraskans" as Nebraska Admirals.

Commissions in the Nebraska Navy have always been given to prominent citizens both inside and outside of Nebraska. However, anyone who has "contributed in some way to the state, promote the Good Life in Nebraska, and warrant recognition as determined by the Governor" can request or be nominated for an admiralship.

== Charitable activities ==
The Nebraska Admirals Association was established in 1986. It is a 501(c)(3) non-profit organization that is devoted to a number of causes, including promoting Nebraska products, educational activities, awarding scholarships, promoting tourism, and providing support for ships and sailors in the United States Navy named after Nebraska-related entities.

== Current guidelines for Admiralships ==
As of October 2026, Governor Jim Pillen requires the following criteria for awarding an Admiralship:

- The nominator or nominee must be a resident of Nebraska.
- Self-nominations will not be honored.
- Those who are nominating persons for Admiralships will need to send the request by U.S. postal mail or present it to the Governor's Office. E-mail requests will not be accepted. All requests must be in writing.
- If the date for the Admiralship is not specifically requested, the received date will be used on the certificate.
- The Governor retains full discretion for any Admiralship requests.
- The Governor's Office requests notice of two to three weeks to process Admiralships.

== Notable admirals ==
Notable admirals include:

- Gene Autry
- Jack Benny
- George W. Bush
- Johnny Carson
- Dick Cavett
- Bing Crosby
- John Charles Daly
- Sandy Dennis
- Costa Dillon
- Elizabeth II
- Julius "Dr. J" Erving
- Eileen Farrell
- Craig Ferguson
- Gerald Ford
- George Gallup
- Bill Gates
- John Glenn
- Chuck Hagel
- Sir Edmund Hillary
- Bob Hope
- Chuck Jones
- Dorothy Kilgallen
- Martin Luther King III
- Ann Landers
- David Letterman
- Douglas MacArthur
- Bill Murray
- Ben Nelson
- Jack Nicklaus
- Tom Osborne
- Arnold Palmer
- Ronald Reagan
- Franklin D. Roosevelt
- Julie Schmit-Albin
- Mark Spitz
- Harry S. Truman
- Donald J. Trump

== Controversial admiralships ==
Equatorial Guinea President Teodoro Obiang Nguema Mbasogo and former Gambian President Yahya Jammeh were both reportedly granted a Nebraska Admiralship. Both Nguema and Jammeh have been criticized for their dictatorial rule over their respective countries, and the reported granting of the admiralship to Jammeh by Governor Dave Heineman drew the criticism of the state's Democratic Party leader.

Governor Pete Ricketts revoked admiralship from two women, Amanda Gailey and Courtney Lawton, in January 2018, less than a month after the award. The honor was revoked, according to the governor's spokesman, because the two had protested the appearance of Turning Point USA, a conservative group that maintains a Professor Watchlist, on the campus of the University of Nebraska–Lincoln. The governor's office had no enforcement power to retrieve the certificates presented to Gailey and Lawton.

== See also ==
- Title of honor
- Other honorary titles in U.S. states:
  - Arkansas Traveler
  - Colonel (U.S. honorary title)
  - Delaware title of Order of the First State of Delaware
  - Great Floridians
  - Kentucky Colonel
  - Indiana title of Sagamore of the Wabash
  - North Carolina title of Order of the Long Leaf Pine
  - Ohio Commodore
  - Rhode Island Commodore
  - South Carolina titles of Order of the Palmetto and Order of the Silver Crescent
  - Texas title of Admiral in the Texas Navy
  - Washington State Leadership Board, formerly known as the Association of Washington Generals
- Admiral
- USS Nebraska
- Landlocked navy
