= Dorothy Runk Mennen =

American theatrical educator and author

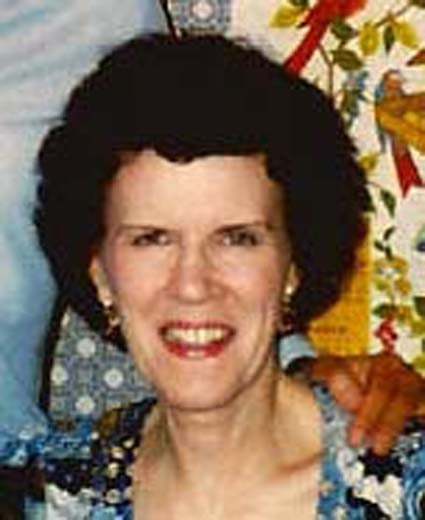
Dorothy Runk Mennen

Dorothy Runk Mennen (July 17, 1915 – February 20, 2011) was a pioneer in the creation of a voice curriculum for the university training of theatre actors and professional performers. She was also a prolific author regarding the training of the voice and Professor Emerita of Theatre at Purdue University.

== Education and early teaching ==
After spending her early life in Ohio, Mennen received her Bachelor of Science degree in Speech from Kent State University in 1938, and received the Honorary Cardinal Key from the National Activities Society for Women for her participation in extracurricular activities. She then taught high school English in Twinsburg, Ohio for 5 years.

=== Teaching at Purdue University ===
After receiving a MA in Theatre from Purdue University in 1964, Mennen taught at Purdue in the Theatre program as the voice teacher for both candidates in the Professional Acting program (graduate) and undergraduate theatre majors from 1964 to 2001. She developed the original voice curriculum for their MFA training for actors "from the ground up", where she was also the vocal director for their musicals, serving for over 70 productions. In the 1960s she put together several programs, including the voice and speech program for the American Theater Program.

She was the first female president of the American Association of University Professors at Purdue, helped form the Women's Caucus to study and implement gender equity, and was the first female president of the Purdue Senate. As Professor Emerita, she was involved in the classroom climate interactive theatre workshop program. Mennen served Purdue for over 60 years. She also did consulting and taught privately.

== Author ==
Mennen was the author of The Speaking-Singing Voice, A Vocal Synthesisis. She is also listed as a contributor to The Complete Voice and Speech Workout, published in 2002, part of the editorial board for Marian E. Hampton's The Vocal Vision: Views on Voice, and associate editor of Singing for Standard Speech and other Contemporary Issues in Voice. She also served as an editor for the Voice and Speech Review.

== Voice and Speech Trainers Association ==
Mennen was the founding president of the Voice and Speech Trainers Association (VASTA) in 1986, which became an international organization because of her efforts. Mennen continued as a vital member of the VASTA board for twenty years after her retirement. She also served on the board of the Indiana chapter of the National Association of Teachers of Singing (NATS) and was a member of the Voice Foundation.

== Recognition ==
=== National recognition ===
In 1985, she was given a national award for Leadership and Performance by the University/Resident Theatre Association(U/RTA).

=== Mennen Scholarship ===
After her retirement in 2001, Purdue Theatre professor Richard Stockton Rand said, "Dorothy has navigated through many generations of Purdue University Theater; assisting as needed, selflessly, in a myriad of capacities without any expectation of recognition at any point in her long and distinguished career." The Dorothy Runk Mennen Scholarship Fund was created at the end of the 2001-2002 Purdue University Theatre season, in order to commemorate and honor the efforts of one of the department's "biggest fans".

A letter to the faculty reads, "Perhaps because my family lived here...I knew this was where I would be. I always saw the faculty and staff as a gestalt. it was our personal responsibility to make each one not only look good, but be good as artists and teachers. It was important to make the Theatre live up to its potential with the university and the students. To me, this meant being a part of the university as a whole and to serve it."

The scholarship criteria reads: The Dorothy Runk Mennen Scholarship was created to honor the spirit of Dorothy Runk Mennen, who has given much of her professional life to the theatre at Purdue University. Her academic work emphasized the importance of speech and voice in the theatre curriculum at Purdue and throughout higher education. Recognizing her impact beyond academics, this scholarship celebrates her unwavering enthusiasm and steadfast encouragement of students to pursue their dreams. It is a merit-based scholarship given to upperclassmen who have made outstanding artistic or craft contributions during their years of studying theatre at Purdue and who have provided notable support and encouragement of their fellow students.

=== Distinguished Purdue Alumna ===
In 2003, she was honored as a distinguished alumna of Purdue University for her professional achievements, dedication to community, and involvement with Purdue.

=== Sagamore of the Wabash ===
Also in 2003, she received the Sagamore of the Wabash Award from Governor Frank O'Bannon. Until 2006, the award was the highest honor which the Governor of Indiana bestows, a personal tribute usually given to those who rendered distinguished service to the state or to the governor.

=== Mennen Research/Development Grants ===
In 2009, VASTA created the Dorothy Mennen Research/Development Grant, which awards of up to $1000 to fund VASTA members for research or professional development. The VASTA Voice newsletter of September 2009 stated that this award was "named for Mennen, 'the mother of us all.' Dorothy's spirit of encouragement, vision of inclusivity, professionalism, determination and generosity are at the heart of VASTA's mission."

=== Lifetime Distinguished Member of VASTA ===
Mennen is featured as a Lifetime Distinguished Member of VASTA, honoring "individuals who have made outstanding contributions to the field of Voice & Speech. In recognition of their achievements, they are given an honorary membership." Mennen joins a group of pioneers in voice training, including Frankie Armstrong, Cicely Berry, Arthur Lessac, Kristin Linklater, and Patsy Rodenburg.

=== Purdue Legacy Award ===
On October 1, 2010, Mennen was inducted as a Purdue Legacy recipient for her contributions to Purdue Theatre. Mennen could not attend due to illness. Purdue grad and Theater and Television Director Tom Moore offered words of thanks for the support, encouragement and wisdom that Mennen provided over the years.

=== Mennen Lobby ===
In the Pao Center for the Performing Arts on the Purdue campus, the lobby of the Nancy Hansen Theatre was named the Dorothy Runk Mennen lobby.

== Personal life ==
She married Harold Mennen in 1943. After he returned from military service, they moved to West Lafayette, Indiana. After her retirement from Purdue, Mennen moved with her husband to Owosso, Michigan, where she lived until her death.
