= Honorable Order of Kentucky Colonels =

Voluntary philanthropic 501(c)(3) organization

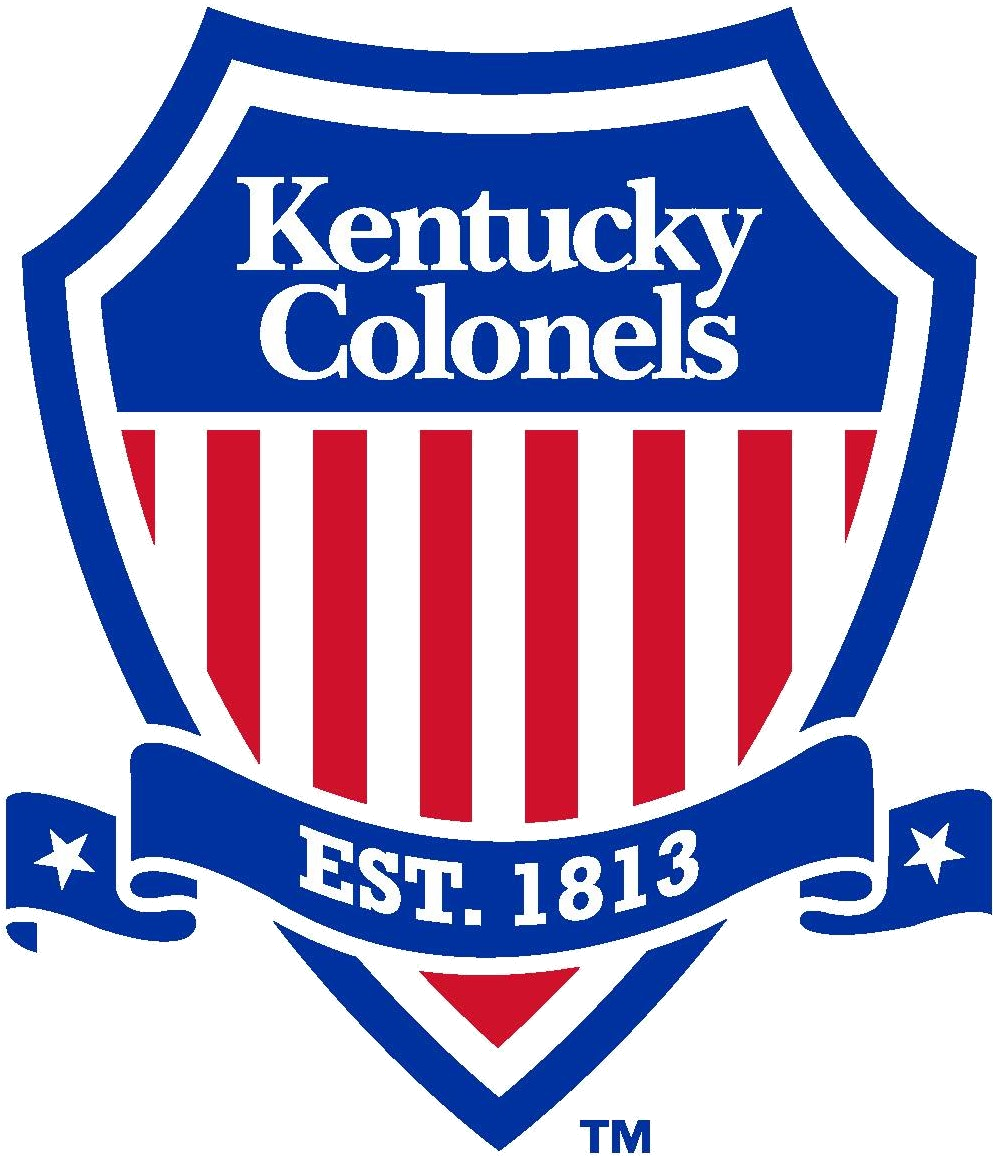
- Abbreviation: HOKC
- Nickname: Honorable Order
- Formation: September 1933
- Founder: Ruby Laffoon
- Founded at: Frankfort, Kentucky
- Type: Non-Profit 501(c)(3)
- Tax ID no.: 61-0485432
- Registration no.: KY-0023672
- Legal status: Active
- Purpose: Charitable, Philanthropic
- Headquarters: Kentucky
- Location: Louisville, Kentucky, United States
- Coordinates: 38.23944°N 85.75389°W
- Products: Memorabilia, Apparel, Baseball caps, Souvenirs
- Services: Membership, Events, Scholarships, Grants
- Methods: Fundraising
- Members: 30,000+ (2020)
- Commanding General: General Gary Boschert
- Executive Director: Col. Sherry Crose
- Key people: Board of Trustees
- Affiliations: Kentucky Colonels Shop
- Website: Kentucky Colonels

Kentucky Colonels
- Country: United States
- Registered as a trademark in: U.S. Patent and Trademark Office
- Tagline: Established in 1813
- Website: Kentucky Colonels Shop
- "Honorable Order of Kentucky Colonels" and "Kentucky Colonels" are registered trademarks of the HOKC under various US and international classes with the USPTO to promote the good will and philanthropic work of the organization.

The Honorable Order of Kentucky Colonels also known as "Kentucky Colonels" or "HOKC" is a charitable, non-profit 501(c)(3) organization engaged in collective philanthropy for Kentuckians on the behalf of thousands of who have received a Kentucky Colonel commission from around the world. In 2020 the organization raised over 2.9 million dollars to provide small grants to 177 non-profit organizations in Kentucky. The organization makes an impact on millions of lives each year through all the organizations it serves.

The Honorable Order of Kentucky Colonels does not actually commission Kentucky Colonels. Instead, that power remains with the current Kentucky governor, as it has since Isaac Shelby's administration starting in 1792. Currently there is an application filed with the governor's office in Frankfort that allows people to submit nominations for a person to become a Kentucky Colonel.

== Introduction ==
In the 1930s, the conversation around the colonel title moved towards an interest in creating a social group for Kentucky colonels, and on September 26, 1933, with the blessing of the governor, [T]he Honorable Order of the Kentucky Colonels was formed in New York City with Miss Anna Bell Ward and General Charles C. Pettijohn. The purpose of the new organization according to the General, was "to bring together at the Kentucky Derby each May in Louisville all persons holding Kentucky colonels and other honorary military commissions". Pettijohn announced that Governor Laffoon of Kentucky would serve as Commander in Chief; Admiral Louis McHenry Howe in Washington was in-charge of water activities; Colonel Will Rogers was commander of all colonels west of the Mississippi; Colonel Irvin S. Cobb in-charge of all colonels east of the Mississippi; Colonel Felix Feist of Los Angeles was commander in-charge of all western waters and waterways; Colonel Morton Downey of Chicago and New York was named commander of the Great Lakes; and Colonel James A. Farley of Washington was in-charge of communications.

Small associations in Louisville and several Kentucky Colonels social clubs that were started years earlier as far away as Dallas, Chicago and other parts of the country were all invited to become part of the new organization. The following year in 1934, Governor Ruby Laffoon and Admiral Pettijohn held their first event for the Honorable Order of Kentucky Colonels with a Derby Eve dinner party on May 4. At the banquet sponsored by the Governor, officers were elected by those who attended including Mae West, Eddie Cantor, Thomas D. Taggart and the charter organization that formed in New York months earlier. The following year Mrs. Mary Nisbett Laffoon while in New York met with General Pettijohn and the second in command to make arrangements for 750–1000 Kentucky colonels and admirals to attend the Derby Eve celebration.

The organization has been listed by the Better Business Bureau, Dun & Bradstreet, Charity Navigator and GuideStar by Candid, as well as local Kentucky based organizations that oversee charity efforts. Since they began in 1933 the HOKC has established itself as a well-known organization renowned for its charitable giving and events, including annual barbeques and Derby parties.

== Philanthropy ==
An early example of the charitable activities organized by the Honorable Order was relief efforts for the Ohio River flood of 1937, which had a devastating effect on northern Kentucky and other states along the Ohio River. Colonels Fred Astaire, Eddie Cantor, and Irving Mills were especially instrumental in fund-raising for this project. Today, grants through the Good Works Program are focused on helping organizations that mainly fall within these categories:

- Community enhancement
- Community support
- Education
- Health, rehabilitation, and life skills
- Historic preservation
- Homeless, low income, and those in crisis
- Veteran services and military
- Youth services

In 2022, The Honorable Order of Kentucky Colonels distributed $3.1 million to 314 organizations, benefitting 3.9 million people. This includes ongoing support for the victims of the 2021 Western Kentucky Tornado and the 2022 floods in Eastern Kentucky.

== History ==
The Honorable Order of Kentucky Colonels (HOKC) is the largest organization of Kentucky colonels, so well known that their name, wordmarks, trademarks and service marks, the "Kentucky Colonels" has become synonymous with their identity.

The Honorable Order of Kentucky Colonels was first established during the depression in 1933 by Governor Ruby Laffoon to raise tax-revenues and attract attention to the state, it was founded based on the recommendation of Governor Flem Sampson in 1931 and the enthusiasm of colonels to establish an order and brotherhood. Governor Laffoon awarded over 10,000 commissions between 1932 and 1935, he established the organization originally as a state order of merit with an office at the capital. After being criticized politically and challenged legally by the Attorney General of the Commonwealth, Beverly Vincent who cancelled 17,000 colonel commissions in 1936; the practice was reinstated by James Wise serving as the acting governor under Governor Happy Chandler exactly one month later. Since 1936 "Honorable Order of Kentucky Colonels" has been dependent on each of Kentucky's governors to make new colonels. In 1957 they incorporated the organization as a nonprofit dedicated to building playgrounds, curating history, awarding scholarships and providing relief to Kentuckians in need.

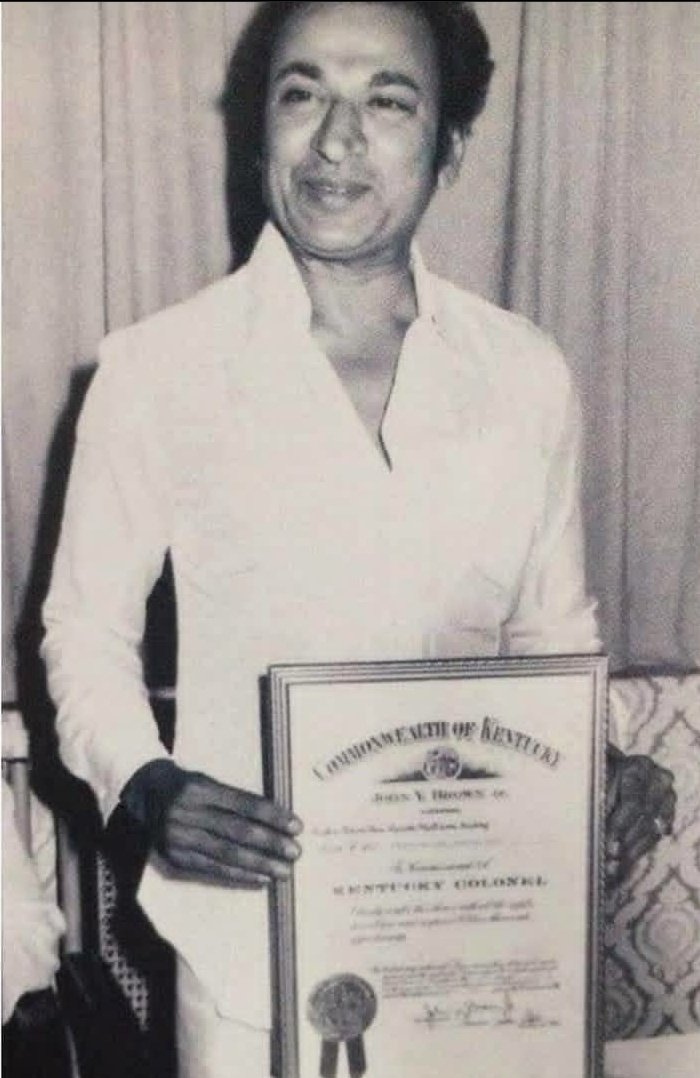
Dr. Rajkumar, the only Asian actor to be bestowed a Kentucky Colonel

The Governor of Kentucky serves symbolically as the "Commander-in-Chief" of the Honorable Order, and its board of trustees recognized as its 'Generals' who serve on a volunteer basis. The mission of the organization is to aid and promote the Commonwealth of Kentucky and its citizens. The organization raises money to support Kentucky charities, educational organizations, and to conduct other good works that will help the citizens of Kentucky. The organization's charitable efforts have also sometimes extended past the borders of the Commonwealth, such as contributing to natural disaster relief in neighboring states. By 1979, annual donations exceeded $500,000, and by 1992, they exceeded $1 million. In 2020 the organization made grants to 265 organizations in the state in excess of 2.9 million dollars.

In addition to its direct charity work known as its Good Works Program, the HOKC organizes special events such as a Homecoming Weekend and events celebrating the Kentucky Derby, and sells Kentucky colonel-themed commemorative merchandise such as apparel and drinkware bearing its Kentucky Colonel Shield logo and the Great Seal of the HOKC. HOKC special events often celebrate features of Kentucky culture, such as bourbon whiskey, horse farms, horse racing, and the local museums, restaurants and tourism attractions, as well as promoting the benevolent Good Works Program.

In 2008, a spokesman for the HOKC said the organization currently had 103,700 members that it considered "active" in their organization, and that they included people from every state and 62 foreign countries, with 40–45% of them being women and only one third of them being within Kentucky. Colonels are not required to officially join the HOKC, and he further said "We don't have a clue as to how many Colonels are out there."

== Organization ==
After a person receives a commission from the governor they automatically become an honorary lifetime member of organization. Recipients of the Kentucky Colonel Commission are invited to donate and participate in the HOKC's charitable efforts throughout the state to be considered an active member. The organization organizes local events in conjunction with the Kentucky Derby which is held every year in Louisville. In 2020 the executive director, Col. Sherry Crose, stated the organization had 30,000 active members and volunteers.

Members of the organization that donate each year receive a membership card and if they live in Kentucky can apply for vanity license plates for their motor vehicle; they are also invited to participate in annual events like the Kentucky Derby and the Kentucky Colonels Barbecue which is held each year in the Fall. The organization's international headquarters in Louisville where the board of trustees meet and Kentucky colonels can visit.

== See also ==
- Goodwill ambassador
- Kentucky Colonel
