= Doug Hinds (politician) =

American politician (1933–2025)

Member of the South Carolina Senate for the 34th district
- In office 1989–1992

Mayor of Georgetown, South Carolina
- In office 1977–1986

Personal details
- Born: Douglas Lanford Hinds; May 25, 1933 Kingstree, South Carolina, U.S.
- Died: May 2, 2025 (aged 91) Georgetown, South Carolina, U.S.
- Party: Democratic
- Spouse: Lynette Balliew
- Children: 3
- Education: Furman University (BA); University of South Carolina School of Law (JD)
- Profession: Attorney

Douglas Lanford Hinds (May 25, 1933 – May 2, 2025) was an American politician who represented District 34 in the South Carolina Senate from 1989 to 1992 and earlier served as mayor of Georgetown, South Carolina from 1977 to 1986. Over four decades in public life he was noted for his conservation advocacy on Winyah Bay, his low-country legal practice and leadership that in 1992 earned him the state’s highest civilian honour, the Order of the Palmetto.

== Early life and education ==
Hinds was born in Kingstree, Williamsburg County, the eldest of three children of Joseph James Hinds and Lillian Lyda Hinds. He attended Furman University, where he graduated with a bachelor's degree in 1955. He received his Juris Doctor from the University of South Carolina School of Law in 1963 and was admitted to the South Carolina Bar the same year.

== Career ==
Running as a coastal-conservation Democrat, Hinds won a 1989 special election to fill the District 34 seat and was re-elected in 1990. His district work included brokering the agreement that led to federal designation of the North Inlet–Winyah Bay National Estuarine Research Reserve, approved by the NOAA in 1992.

Previously, Hinds was elected mayor of Georgetown in 1977, a post he held for three two-year terms.

== Death ==
Hinds died in Georgetown on May 2, 2025, at the age of 91.

== Awards and honors ==
Governor Carroll Campbell presented Hinds with the Order of the Palmetto on June 4, 1992, for “meritorious service in conservation and coastal management.”
