= Julie Schmit-Albin =

American political activist (1956–2020)

- Born: August 23, 1956; Bellwood, Nebraska
- Died: August 22, 2020 (aged 63); Lincoln, Nebraska
- Occupation: Activist
- Years active: 1989–2020
- Father: Loran Schmit

Julia René Schmit-Albin (August 23, 1956 – August 22, 2020) was an American political activist recognized for her work in the United States anti-abortion movement in Nebraska, serving as the director of the Nebraska Right to Life organization from 1989 until her death. She was awarded the title of Admiral in the Great Navy of the State of Nebraska by Governor of Nebraska Pete Ricketts.

== Career ==
Schmit-Albin served as the director of the Nebraska Right to Life organization from 1989 until her death in 2020. During that time, she helped pass several anti-abortion bills in the Nebraska Legislature. Schmit-Albin and the Nebraska Right to Life organization were widely recognized for their political influence in the Nebraska Legislature. In a 2007 article in the Lincoln Journal Star headlined "Check with Schmit-Albin if you want to win", W. Don Nelson, former state director for U.S. Senator Ben Nelson, told the journal that "Anyone who runs for public office without touching base with her does so at their peril."

In 2012, the Nebraska Legislature was considering LB 599, which would provide prenatal care to low-income pregnant women who lost their Medicare coverage for prenatal care in 2010. Several senators in the Legislature voted against the passage of the bill, citing their complaints that it would provide undocumented mothers with taxpayer-funded coverage. In an open letter, Schmit-Albin criticized several senators for voting against the bill, writing that "It is sad and alarming that we have come to this point where some of the major pro-life leaders in the Legislature are choosing to put the illegal immigration issue and who pays for what, over the life and health of babies in the womb." The bill passed over the veto of Governor Dave Heineman.

== Personal life ==
=== Death ===
Schmit-Albin died of cancer on August 22, 2020. Her death sparked many to remember her influence. Nebraska Senator Joni Albrecht praised Schmit-Albin on the floor of the Legislature, calling attention to her bravery and "straight-out grit".

Governor of Nebraska Pete Ricketts awarded Schmit-Albin the title of Admiral in the Great Navy of the State of Nebraska, the highest honor in the state of Nebraska.
