= Rhode Island Commodore =

Highest civic honor awarded by the US state of Rhode Island

Rhode Island Commodore crest

Rhode Island Commodore is Rhode Island's highest honor and an honorary title bestowed upon individuals by approval of the governor of Rhode Island. It is not a military rank, requires no duties, and carries with it no pay or other compensation. However, the Rhode Island Commodores since 1975 have been organized as a non-profit, non-partisan organization with the purpose "to assist and stimulate economic enterprise within Rhode Island by direct action through education, economic promotion, and hospitality."

== Organizational history ==
The honorary title of Rhode Island Commodore was established in 1968 by then governor John H. Chafee. Commission as a Rhode Island Commodore is bestowed upon prominent citizens who are business or non-elected civic leaders in Rhode Island upon nomination by an active Commodore, recommendation by the board of directors, and appointment by the governor. On 23 December 1975, during the administration of Governor Philip Noel, the Rhode Island Commodores was incorporated as a not-for-profit corporation in Rhode Island with Noel and four Rhode Island business leaders including Joseph Samuels "Dody" Sinclair, the chairman of the Outlet Company as initial incorporators. The Governor of Rhode Island, currently Daniel McKee, serves as commander-in-chief of the Commodores, and the organization led by its admiral, currently Jonathan Duffy, and its board of directors. The organization is administered as an auxiliary to the quasi-public Rhode Island Commerce Corporation (aka RI Commerce, formerly known as the Rhode Island Economic Development Corporation). The RI Commerce director, currently Elizabeth Tanner, serves as vice admiral of the Commodores, and she serves as an ex officio member of the board of directors. In 2011, there were about 260 Rhode Island Commodores. Prominent speakers are often featured at meetings of the Commodores, but in 2011 the Rhode Island press criticized the organization for their long-held policy of excluding reporters from their privately held meetings.

== Charitable and business development activities ==
The Rhode Island Commodores is a 501(c)(6) non-profit organization devoted to a number of causes, including promoting economic development in Rhode Island, promoting Rhode Island products, conducting educational activities, promoting tourism and serving as goodwill ambassadors toward visitors to the state and while traveling out of the state. Activities of the Commodores in support of economic development have included participation in efforts to bring new businesses into the state, the co-sponsorship of a statewide business plan competition, and efforts to bring the America's Cup races back to Newport.

Rhode Island Commodores was a prime proponent of the 1984 Greenhouse Compact, a proposed state industrial policy developed primarily by Ira Magaziner to transition the state away from traditional manufacturing industries toward an innovative high technology economy. As proposed, the Greenhouse Compact would provide $250 million of state funds that would be invested to provide low interest loans to businesses to hire new workers, to provide for a fund for new product development by businesses, to provide start-up funds for new businesses, and to provide $50 million in business-related research at Brown University and the University of Rhode Island. When the measure was submitted to the voters in a special referendum held 12 June 1984, the proposal was defeated 121,079 to 29,998.

== Notable commodores ==
Below is a partial list of notable Rhode Island Commodores:

- Lincoln Almond
- Donald Carcieri
- Nancy Carriuolo
- John H. Chafee
- Lincoln Chafee
- David Cicilline
- Trudy Coxe
- Edward D. DiPrete
- David M. Dooley
- Donald J. Farish
- Robert G. Flanders, Jr.
- J. Joseph Garrahy
- Richard I. Gouse
- Alan G. Hassenfeld
- Frank Licht
- Ronald Machtley
- Maxwell Mays
- Philip W. Noel
- Marc Parlange
- Claiborne Pell
- Gina Raimondo
- Michael A. Rice
- Bruce Sundlun
- Ted Turner

== See also ==
- Commodore
- Title of honor
- Other honorary titles in U.S. states:
  - Arkansas Traveler
  - Colonel (U.S. honorary title)
  - Order of the First State of Delaware
  - Kentucky Colonel
  - Sagamore of the Wabash (Indiana)
  - Nebraska Admiral, formally Admiral in the Great Navy of the State of Nebraska
  - Order of the Long Leaf Pine (North Carolina)
  - Ohio Commodore
  - Order of the Palmetto and Order of the Silver Crescent (South Carolina)
  - Admiral in the Texas Navy
  - Washington State Leadership Board, formerly known as the Association of Washington Generals
  - Great Floridians
