= Julia Schramm =

German politician and publicist

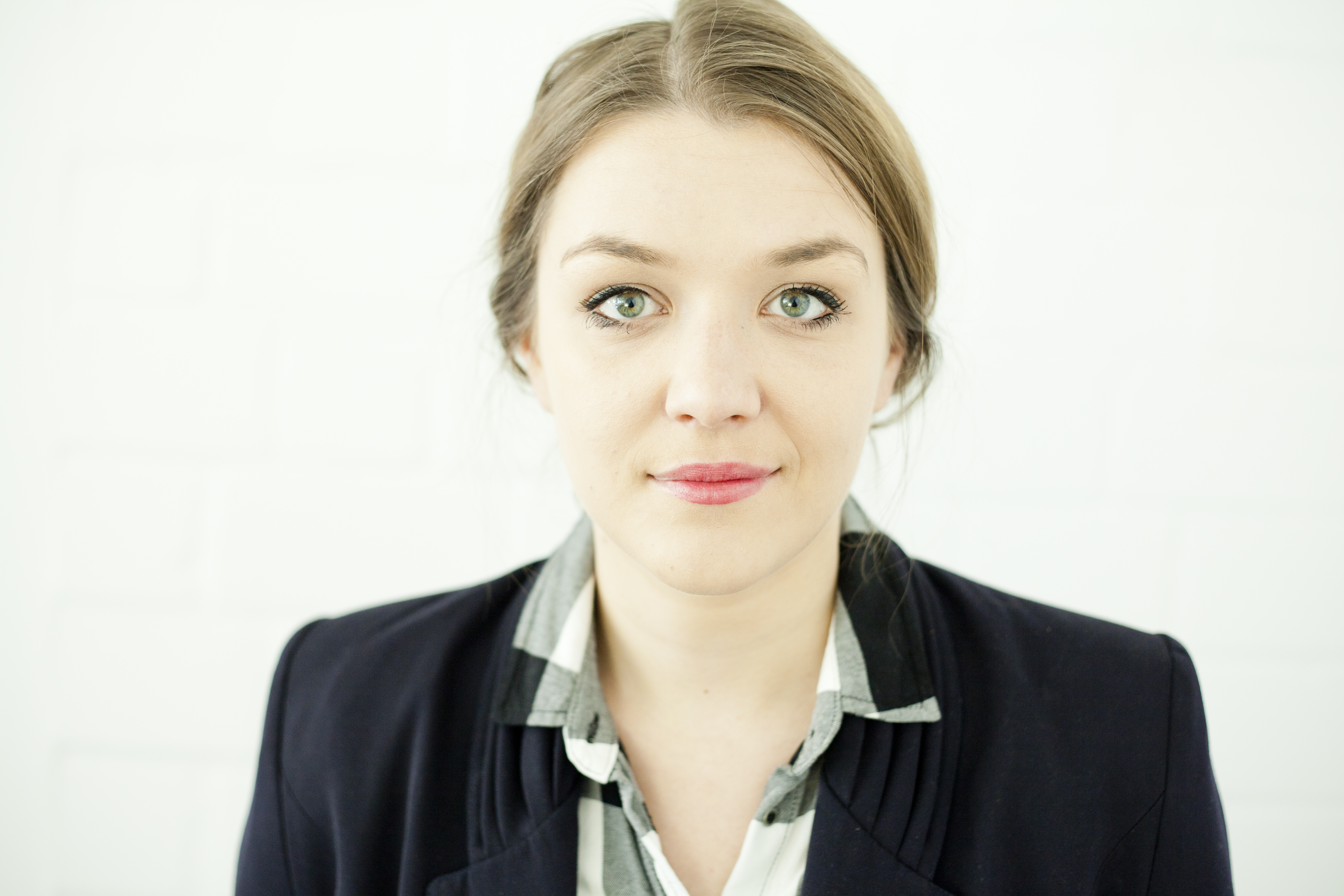
- Julia Schramm 2016

Personal details
- Born: 30 September 1985 (age 41) Frankfurt am Main, Germany
- Party: The Left
- Education: Rheinische Friedrich-Wilhelms-Universität Bonn
- Profession: political scientist
- Website: http://www.juliaschramm.de

Julia Schramm (born 30 September 1985, in Frankfurt am Main) is a German politician and publicist. From April to October 2012, she was a member of the federal executive of the Pirate Party. She left the party in 2014 and joined the Left in 2016.

Her book Click Me, along with her (or her publisher's) pursuit of illegally distributed copies of the book, has caused controversy in Germany. In 2016 she published a book on Angela Merkel called Fifty Shades of Merkel.
