= Cincinnati Health Department =

The Cincinnati Health Department (CHD) is a municipal agency for the City of Cincinnati, Ohio, that runs health centers, lab services, communicable disease experts, environmental services and other public health programs. It was founded in 1826. The CHD has more than 300 physicians, nurses, dentists and dental workers, laboratory technicians, pharmacists, dietitians, lead experts, sanitarians, litter control experts, pest control operators and licensed risk assessors.

== Organization ==
As of 2022, CHD had 470 employees and operated on a $50 million annual budget. The CHD is run by the Cincinnati health commissioner, who is appointed by the city's board of health. Grant Mussman has held the position since January 2023.

== Health department encounters ==
In 2009, CHD saw more than 35,000 patients. Numbers as recent as 2022 indicate one out of every six residents of Cincinnati gets their primary medical care through the agency.

=== Clinical services ===
- 153,548 medical visits
- 2,926 dental sealants
- 62,740 pharmacy visits
- 43,560 lab specimens provided

=== Nursing services ===
- 31,949 health encounters
- 7,667 in-home visits to children and adults in need of care

=== Environmental services ===
- 5,085 food service inspections
- 492 swimming pools inspected
- 3,360 nuisance complaints investigated
- 1,055 waste facility inspections

=== Preparedness ===
- More than 45,000 H1N1 flu immunizations at schools, health centers and community sessions in Cincinnati.

== See also ==
- Federally Qualified Health Center
- United States Public Health Service
