= Order of the Long Leaf Pine =

Honor granted by the Governor of North Carolina

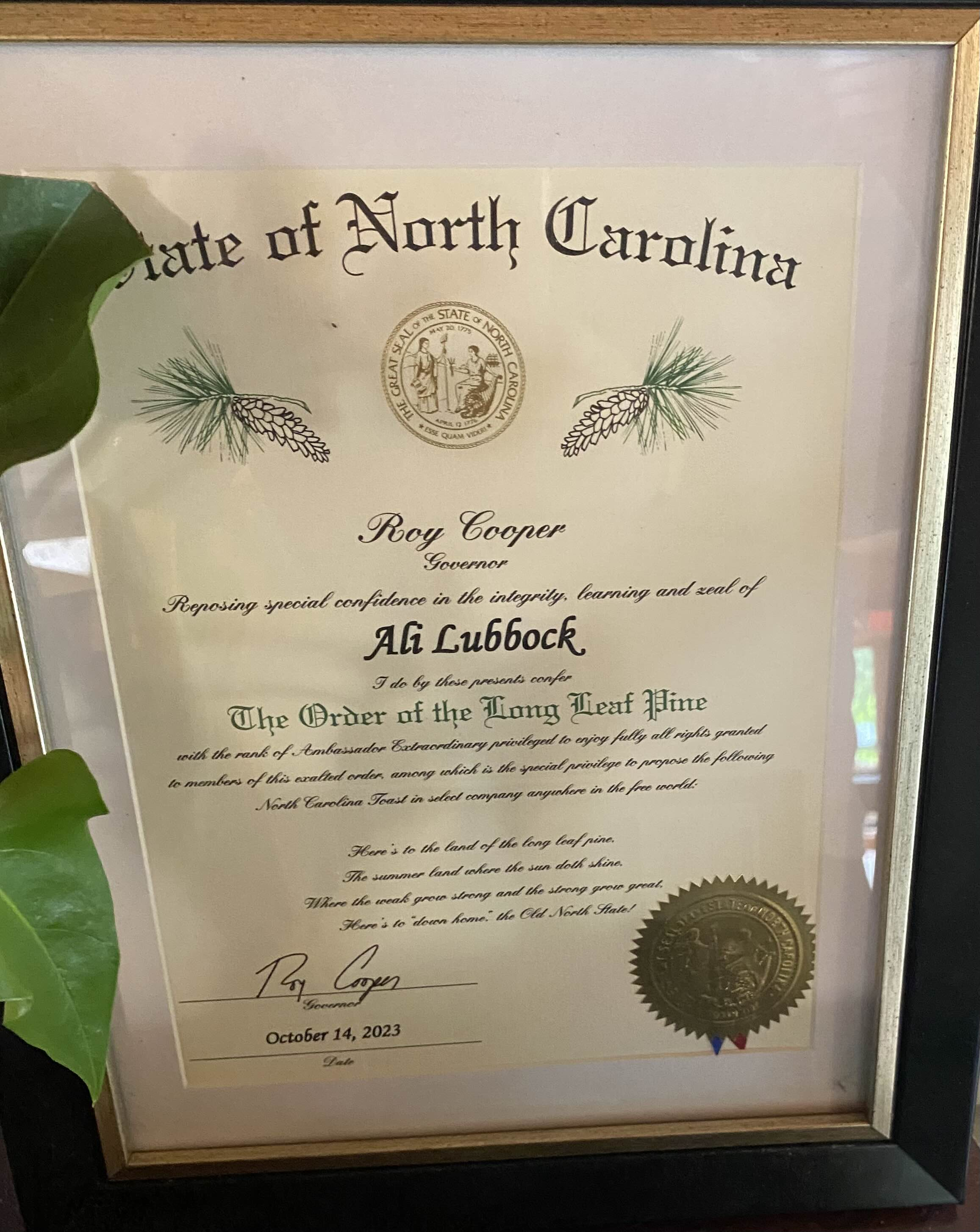
A certificate of the award granted by Roy Cooper in 2023

The Order of the Long Leaf Pine, created in 1964, is an honor that can be granted in the U.S. state of North Carolina. As of 2021, it was believed the Order had been awarded to more than 21,000 people.

== The Order ==
The Order of the Long Leaf Pine is among the most prestigious awards presented by the Governor of North Carolina. The Order of the Long Leaf Pine is presented to individuals who have a proven record of extraordinary service to the state. Contributions to their communities, extra effort in their careers, and many years of service to their organizations are some of the guidelines by which recipients are selected for this award. The honor is most often presented when a person retires.

A state employee can be awarded with the order if the employee has contributed more than 30 years of dedicated and enthusiastic service to the state of North Carolina.

The Order is similar to honors bestowed in other states, such as the Kentucky Colonel and South Carolina's Order of the Palmetto. The Order began as a symbolic honor for visiting dignitaries, but later it became an honor for notable North Carolinians. Although sometimes called the state's highest civilian honor in an order of precedence, that distinction legally belongs to the North Carolina Award. After the North Carolina Award and the Order of the Long Leaf Pine, the next award in order of precedence is the Old North State Award and then the Cardinal Award, all of which are bestowed by the Governor of North Carolina.

== Notable recipients ==
As of 2021, it was believed the Order had been awarded to more than 21,000 people.

== Certificate ==
The certificate reads in part:

Reposing special confidence in the integrity, learning and zeal of [honoree], I [the Governor of North Carolina] do by these presents confer The Order of the Long Leaf Pine with the rank of Ambassador Extraordinary, privileged to enjoy fully all rights granted to members of this exalted order, among which is the special privilege to propose the following North Carolina toast in select company anywhere in the free world:

This is the first verse of the official toast of North Carolina, from a poem by Leonora Monteiro Martin.

Here's to the land of the long leaf pine,
The summer land where the sun doth shine,
Where the weak grow strong and the strong grow great,
Here's to "Down Home," the Old North State!

== The Old North State Award ==
Following the Order of the Long Leaf Pine in North Carolina's order of precedence is the Old North State Award. This award may be granted for any number of reasons. Since January 2017, when Roy Cooper became Governor of North Carolina, it is awarded for 20 years of service. During the terms of earlier governors it was awarded without an explicit requirement of service duration . The certificate for The Old North State Award reads as follows:

For dedication and service beyond expectation and excellence to the Great State of North Carolina, on behalf of the citizens of this state, I bestow upon:

(Name of Recipient)

The Old North State Award

'Working together, we can make North Carolina the place of unlimited opportunity---- a place where anyone who studies hard, works hard and lives a life with high values can fulfill and even exceed their potential.'

(Signed)

Governor of North Carolina

(Date)

== See also ==
- Great Floridians
- Kentucky Colonel
- Nebraska Admiral
- Rhode Island Commodore
- Sagamore of the Wabash
- Arkansas Traveler (honorary title)
- Order of the Palmetto
