= Order of the Palmetto =

Civilian honor awarded by the governor of South Carolina

The Order of the Palmetto is the highest honor awarded by the governor of South Carolina. It is awarded to South Carolinians who demonstrate extraordinary lifetime achievement, service and contributions of national or statewide significance.

== History ==
Governor John West created the Order of the Palmetto in 1971 to recognize lifetime achievement and service by South Carolina residents and those born in the state. It is thought to be modeled on similar honors bestowed in other states, such as the Kentucky Colonel.

Over the years, the honor program has been modified. In 1997, Governor David Beasley established the Order of the Silver Crescent as a companion award to the Order of the Palmetto to recognize contributions by persons younger than 18. In 1999, Governor Jim Hodges created a non-partisan screening panel to review nominations. The eligibility criteria for the Order of the Silver Crescent was changed to make it an auxiliary award honoring achievement or service at the local level, without restrictions of age. In 2003, Governor Mark Sanford created a panel to establish firm criteria for award eligibility, with the goal of changing the perception that the order was a political send-off.

As of 2004, over 3,500 people have been honored with the Order of the Palmetto. Awardees include the rock band Hootie and the Blowfish, which Governor Jim Hodges recognized in 1999 for its charity efforts. Governors Henry McMaster and Nikki Haley received the award prior to their assuming office. Mary Simms Oliphant, honored in 1982, was the first woman to receive the award. Other notable recipients include novelist Pat Conroy, civil rights activist Septima Poinsette Clark, football coach Lou Holtz, naturalist Rudy Mancke, and musician James Brown.

== Award ==
The award comes in the form of a certificate or plaque that, in part, reads:

In grateful recognition of your contributions and friendship to the State of South Carolina and her people, I do hereby confer unto you the Order of the Palmetto with all the rights and privileges appertaining thereto.

== See also ==
- Goodwill Ambassador
- Arkansas Traveler
- Colonel (U.S. honorary title)
- Nebraska Admiral
- Order of the Long Leaf Pine (of North Carolina)
- Kentucky Colonel
- Rhode Island Commodore
- Sagamore of the Wabash (of Indiana)
- Great Floridians
- Susan Audé
