= Kentucky Colonel =

Highest civic honor awarded by Kentucky

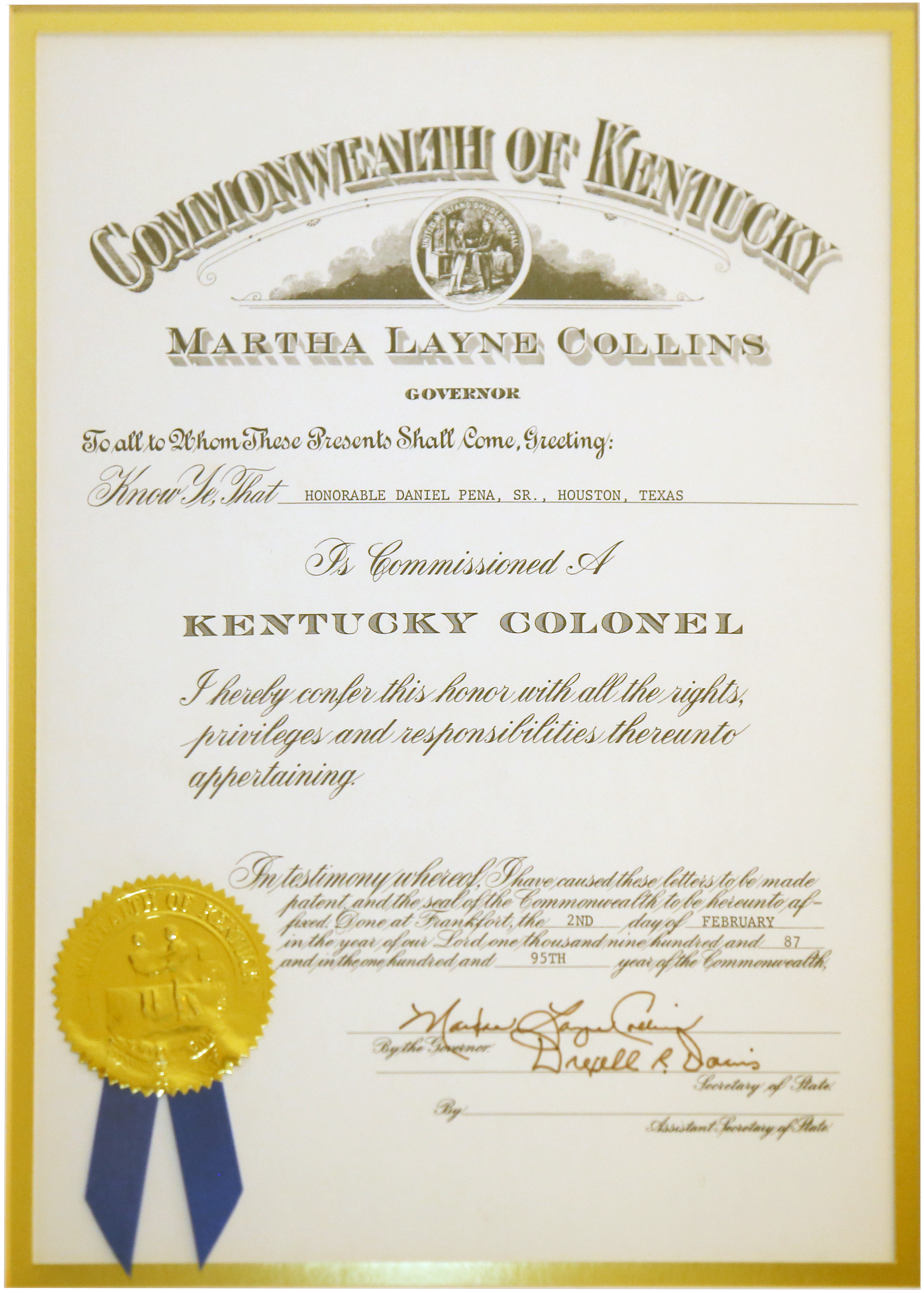
- A letters patent certificate for a Kentucky Colonel issued in 1987 by Governor Martha Layne Collins

Awarded by the Commonwealth of Kentucky
- Type: State order & order of merit
- Established: 1894
- Country: United States
- Seat: Frankfort, Kentucky
- Ribbon: Kentucky Blue
- Motto: United We Stand; Divided We Fall
- Eligibility: Civilian
- Criteria: Recognition of good deed, contribution to state prosperity, community service, or noteworthy action performed by an individual.
- Status: Honorary
- Founder: William O'Connell Bradley

Statistics
- First induction: 1894
- Last induction: Current
- Total inductees: About 350,000

Kentucky Colonel is the highest title of honor bestowed by the U.S. state of Kentucky. It is the best-known colonelcy in the United States. A Kentucky Colonel Commission, the certificate, is awarded in the name of the Commonwealth by the governor of Kentucky to individuals with "Honorable" titular style recognition preceding the names of civilians aged 18 or over, for noteworthy accomplishments, contributions to civil society, remarkable deeds, or outstanding service to the community, state, or nation. The governor bestows the honorable title with a colonelcy commission, by issuance of letters patent.

While many famous and noteworthy people have received commissions as Kentucky colonels, the award is equally available to those of all backgrounds based on their deeds. A Kentucky colonel is traditionally considered a goodwill ambassador of the Kentucky state, culture, folklore, traditions, and values.

Although Kentucky colonels are considered in common law to be aides-de-camp to the governors and members of their staff and thus entitled to the style of "Honorable", Kentucky colonels are usually just referred to and addressed as "Colonel" and use the abbreviation "Col." or Kentucky colonel when the term is not being used as a specific title for an individual. Most properly in writing this becomes "Col. First Name, Middle, Surname, Kentucky Colonel".

== History ==
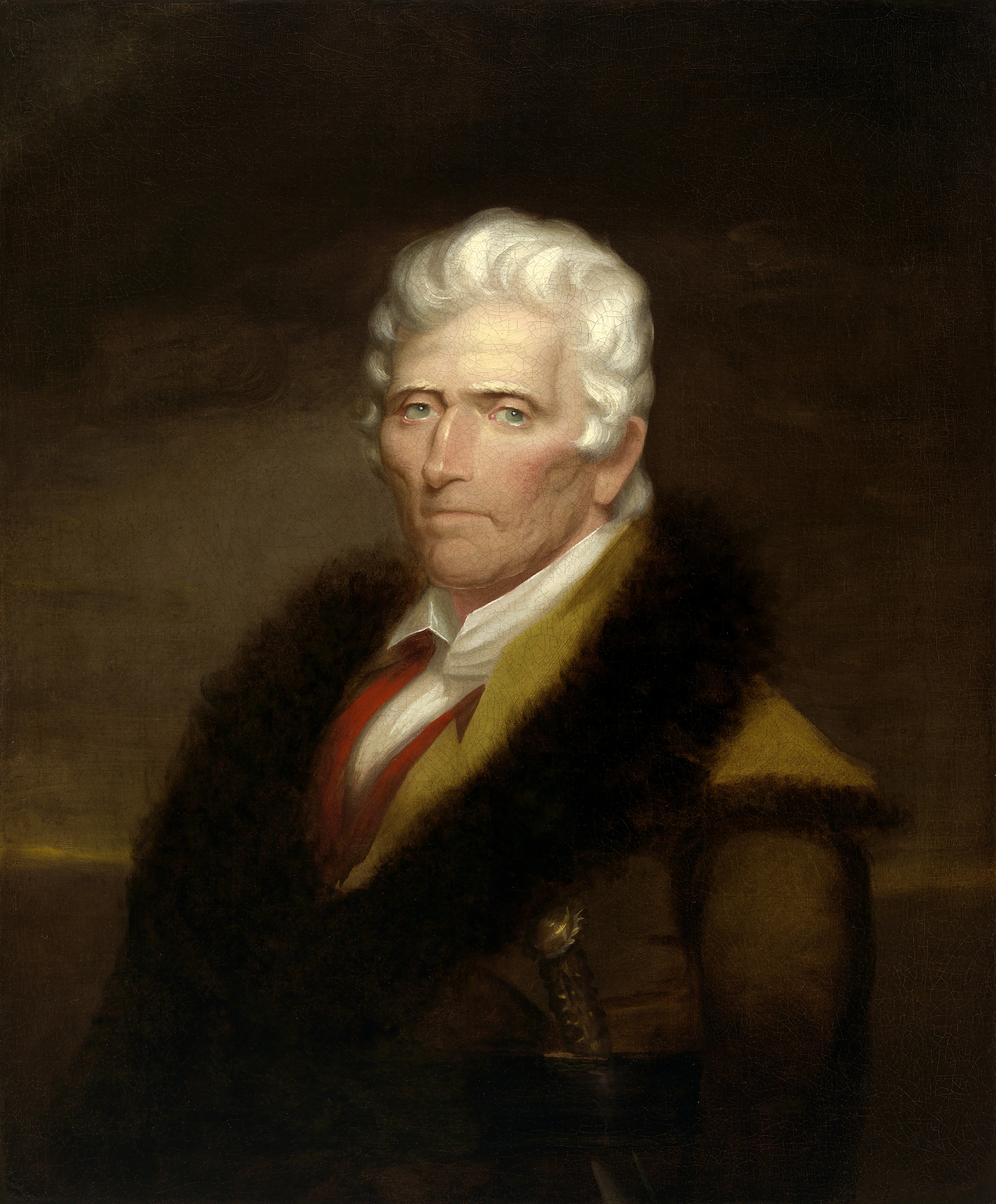
A portrait of Daniel Boone, one of the first Kentucky colonels, painted by Chester Harding in 1820

=== First Kentucky Colonels ===
In 1776, Col. John Bowman was the first Kentucky colonel officially appointed. Col. John Bowman was appointed as colonel of the Militia of Kentucky County by Governor of the Colony of Virginia Patrick Henry. Notable pioneer, Daniel Boone was given the title "colonel" by Col. Judge Richard Henderson in 1775 when he founded the settlement of Boonesborough. Boone was granted a Kentucky colonelcy in 1780 when he was commissioned by the governor of Virginia. At the time Kentucky colonelcy was still military appointment, in contrast to the modern Kentucky colonelcy, which is an honorary title for civilians.

Charles S. Todd is often mistakenly believed to be the first recipient of an honorary commission as a Kentucky colonel in 1813. This is disputed by Col. Todd's biography, and US military archives. The identity of the first civilian honorary colonel is not known. In 1895, Governor William O'Connell Bradley commissioned the first honorary Kentucky colonels as an award of merit bestowed upon citizens for their individual contributions to the state, good deeds, and noteworthy actions.

=== Kentucky Colonels in literature ===
In 1784, John Filson published his book The discovery, settlement and present state of Kentucke which contained an appendix entitled "The adventures of Col. Daniel Boon, one of the first settlers". Filson's book gained popularity and Boone became a symbol of American pioneering. There became increased interest in the trans-Appalachian West among both Europeans and Americans. Filson's The adventures of Col. Daniel Boon, one of the first settlers was reprinted in France, Germany, England and New York. With the widespread fame of Filson's novel came a greater recognition of Kentucky and its colonelcy.

In 1890, Opie Read published A Kentucky Colonel, which spawned a new public perception of what a Kentucky colonel was, posing himself more as a refined, well-mannered southern gentleman, rather than a figure in the Kentucky militia. In 1905, this view was expanded by Zoe Anderson Norris publishing Twelve Kentucky Colonel Stories: Describing Scenes and Incidents in a Kentucky Colonel's Life in the Southland in The New York Sun.

=== 20th century ===
In 1931, an article about the growing number of Kentucky colonels was published in the Las Vegas Age, headlined "Thousand New Kunnels, Suh, In 25 Years Mighty Near Too Much For Kentucky, Suh". Prior to 1932, only about 1,000 people had received official "Honorable" commissions as Kentucky colonels from Kentucky's governors. Governor Ruby Laffoon, in office from 1931 to 1935, dramatically increased the number of colonels by issuing more than 10,000 commissions in 1933 and 1934. Among his motives was the aim to officially associate a Kentucky colonel with the Commonwealth, to tax the title of colonel, and to boost his political support. One of his most famous colonelships was granted to restaurateur Harland Sanders, who was commissioned by Laffoon in 1935.

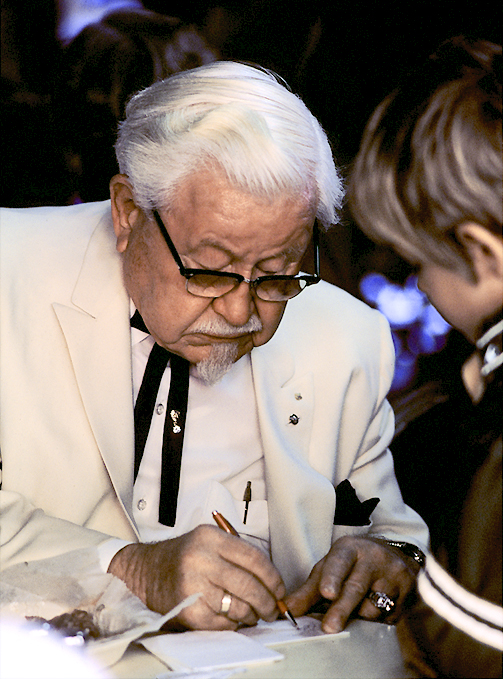
Colonel Harland Sanders was commissioned by Governor Ruby Laffoon in 1935 and launched Kentucky Fried Chicken as a franchise chain in 1952.

When Governor Albert Benjamin Chandler, better known as Happy Chandler, took office in 1935, he took a very different view on the distinction of a Kentucky colonel commission and only issued about a dozen new commissions annually, on Derby Day. Governor Keen Johnson followed Chandler's lead during his time in office from 1939 to 1943, commissioning only those individuals who were deemed to have exhibited exceptionally noteworthy accomplishments and outstanding service to a community, state or the nation. Subsequent governors have typically been much more liberal in issuing Kentucky colonel commissions.

== Honorable Order of Kentucky Colonels ==
The Honorable Order of Kentucky Colonels (HOKC) was first established during the depression in 1933 by Governor Ruby Laffoon as a state order of merit with an office at the capital. In 1957, it was incorporated as a nonprofit dedicated to building playgrounds, curating history, awarding scholarships and providing relief to Kentuckians in need.

After a person receives a commission from the governor they automatically become an honorary lifetime member of the organization and, via donation to and participation in the HOKC's charitable efforts throughout the state they can be considered an active member.

=== Kentucky colonel toast ===
In 1936, New York advertising agency owner, Kentucky colonel Arthur Kudner, wrote a toast to Kentucky colonels. The toast was quickly adopted by the HOKC, and it was widely promoted and published for use by colonels. The toast has since been ceremoniously presented at each of the Kentucky Colonels' Derby Eve Banquets:

I give you a man dedicated to the good things of life, to the gentle, the heartfelt things, to good living, and to the kindly rites with which it is surrounded. In all the clash of a plangent world he holds firm to his ideal – a gracious existence in that country of content "where slower clocks strike happier hours". He stands in spirit on a tall-columned veranda, a hospitable glass in his hand, and he looks over the good and fertile earth, over ripening fields, over meadows of rippling bluegrass. The rounded note of a horn floats through the fragrant stillness. Afar, the sleek and shining flanks of a thoroughbred catch the bright sun. The broad door, open wide with welcome ... the slow, soft-spoken word ... the familiar step of friendship ... all of this is his life and it is good. He brings fair judgment to sterner things. He is proud in the traditions of his country, in ways that are settled and true. In a trying world darkened by hate and misunderstanding, he is a symbol of those virtues in which men find gallant faith and of the good men might distill from life. Here he stands, then. In the finest sense, an epicure ... a patriot ... a man. Gentlemen, I give you, the Kentucky Colonel.

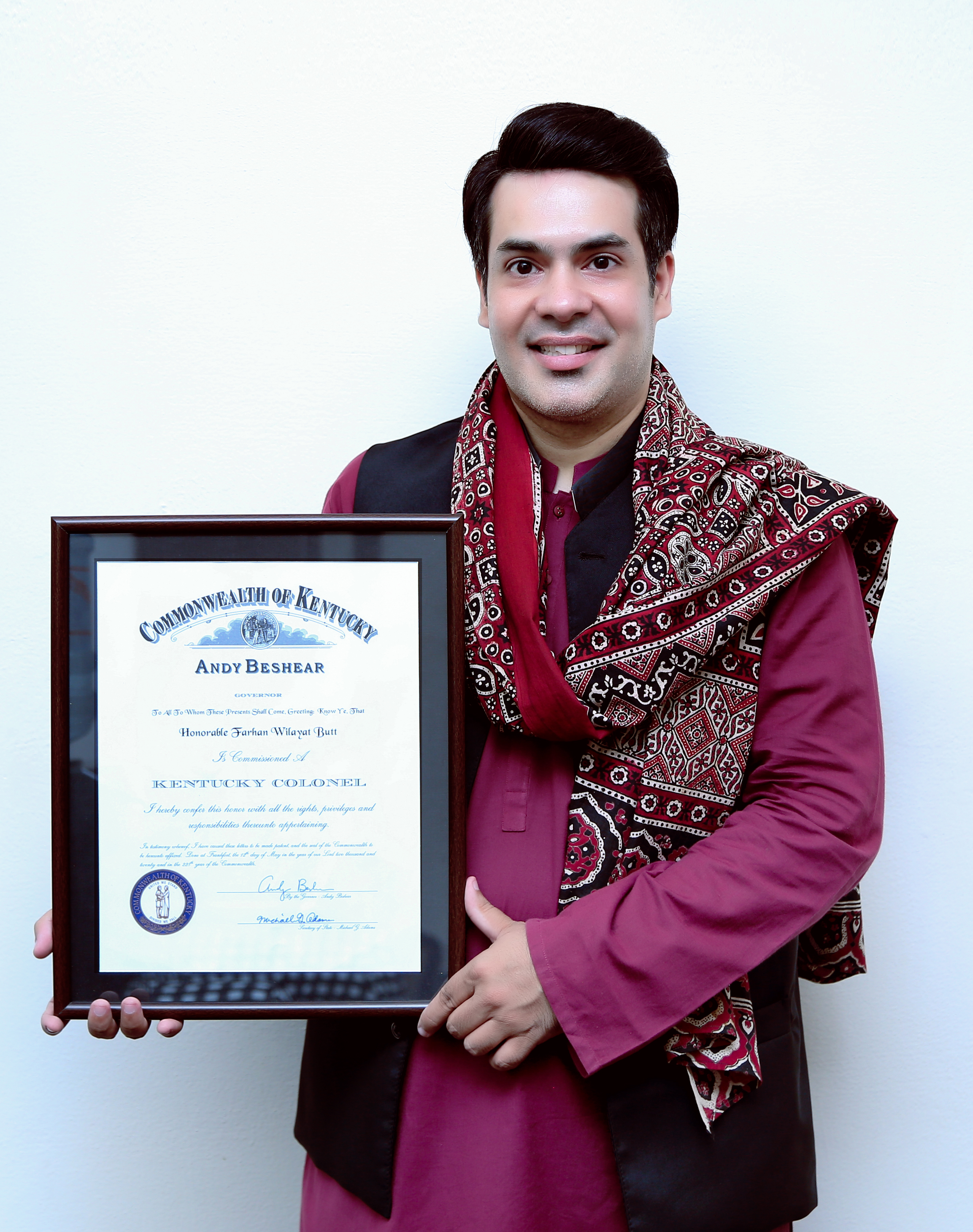
A Pakistani laureate poses with his 2020 Kentucky Colonel Certificate received from Governor of Kentucky, Andy Beshear.

=== Involvement in the nomination process ===
In 2016, Governor Matt Bevin briefly suspended the program to conduct a review of the requirements for receiving the title and then changed the nomination process so that "only active members of the Honorable Order of Kentucky Colonels" were allowed to make recommendations for the honor. Up to that point in time, the longstanding practice had been that recommendations could be submitted by anyone who already was a Kentucky colonel, without any requirement for donations or membership in any particular organization. The nomination process was changed under Governor Andy Beshear. Beshear had the nomination process frozen starting in December 2019. In February 2020, Governor Beshear removed the requirement that the nominators be among those previously designated as Kentucky Colonels.

=== Lawsuits ===
The HOKC filed a federal lawsuit against Kentucky Colonels International (KCI) in 2020. The lawsuit alleged infringement of the "Kentucky Colonels" registered trademark. In 2021, the parties settled the case with a permanent injunction prohibiting KCI from using the "Kentucky Colonels" trademark. In 2023, The HOKC opened a new lawsuit against KCI for "one count of civil contempt, four counts of various federal trademark infringement, one count anticybersquatting, and three counts of various common law trademark infringement". In August 2023 the HOKC won their lawsuit. David J. Wright and his KCI organization were held in contempt of the permanent injunction and ordered to pay legal fees of the HOKC.

== Kentucky colonel influence on culture ==
Starting around 1889, people began incorporating the idea of the Kentucky Colonel as the name or part of the name of bars, beer, bourbon, barbecue, burgoo, clubs, hotels, food, liquor stores, plants, restaurants, social venues, sports teams, tobacco products and even a political lobby. The Kentucky Colonel has always been most notorious for drinking bourbon, making moonshine liquor, storytelling and dueling over their honor starting in the 19th century. Likewise the Kentucky colonel has been portrayed in a number of films, cartoons, movies, books and featured in newspapers since as early as the 1850s.

Those who have received a Kentucky colonelcy commission have often used the title, idea or the image of the concept of the idealistic Kentucky Colonel to promote art, business, events, music, places and recreational activities while simultaneously promoting the state's customs and traditions, resulting in the honor becoming a well-recognized trademark of Kentucky's culture. As it was explained by the defense in the U.S. District Court in 2020, "the idea and image of the Kentucky Colonel and Kentucky colonels is inextricably intertwined with the state".

Examples of the concept of the Kentucky Colonel being used to promote a product or idea include:

- Colonel G.W. Gist built the first modern hotel in Tulsa, Oklahoma, called the Kentucky Colonel Hotel, in 1903.
- Col. Matt Winn was present at the first race at Churchill Downs in 1875 and helped to turn it into the Kentucky Derby.
- The 1960s bluegrass band Kentucky Colonels included Clarence White (later with The Byrds).
- A wide range of memorabilia has been created for sale or recognition including by the Honorable Order of Kentucky Colonels.
- A number of sports teams in Kentucky, have been known as the Kentucky Colonels, including the Kentucky Colonels professional basketball team of 1967–1976, the Kentucky Colonels professional basketball team of 2004, and the Eastern Kentucky Colonels athletic teams of Eastern Kentucky University. The athletic teams from Centre College in Danville are known as the Colonels.
- Harland David Sanders (1890 – 1980) used his title of "Colonel" and his own personal determination to make himself and Kentucky world-famous for fried chicken. From a gas station in Corbin, Kentucky, Colonel Sanders, as he became known, started the fast food franchise Kentucky Fried Chicken, known today as KFC. He became so well known, both nationally and internationally, that he was often referred to simply as "The Colonel", which is the title of a book that was written about his life.

=== Bourbon whiskey ===
The Kentucky colonel title in business marketing is seen in the ongoing historic association between Kentucky and bourbon whiskey production. As of 2013, approximately 95 percent of all bourbon was produced in Kentucky. Kentucky has 4.9 million barrels of bourbon in the process of aging. The historic distiller James B. Beam is referred to as "Colonel James B. Beam" for the marketing of the Jim Beam brand, the largest-selling brand of bourbon.

The Sazerac Company refers to the distiller Albert Blanton as "Colonel Blanton" for their marketing of the Blanton's brand. In both cases, the "Colonel" title refers to being a Kentucky colonel. A brand of Kentucky bourbon called Kentucky Colonel was produced in the 1980s.

At least two current brands of Kentucky bourbon have the word "Colonel" in their name, the Colonel E. H. Taylor and Colonel Lee bourbon brands. In 2020, the Neeley Family Distillery, a craft bourbon distiller in Sparta, Kentucky filed for the trademark "Old Kentucky Colonel" to bring back the original Kentucky Colonel brand.

== Kentucky colonel nominations ==
Each governor decides the selection process and number of colonelcies that are issued. The process has previously required a nomination from another colonel or direct recognition by the governor but, under the process established by Governor Andy Beshear, nominations and recommendations for other people can be submitted by both Kentucky colonels and members of the general public by completing an online form.

== See also ==
- Goodwill Ambassador
- Title of honor
- Other honorary titles in U.S. states:
  - Arkansas Traveler
  - Colonel (U.S. honorary title)
  - Delaware title of Order of the First State of Delaware
  - Indiana title of Sagamore of the Wabash
  - Maine title of Son of Maine
  - Nebraska Admiral, formally Admiral in the Great Navy of the State of Nebraska
  - North Carolina title of Order of the Long Leaf Pine
  - Ohio Commodore
  - Rhode Island Commodore
  - South Carolina titles of Order of the Palmetto and Order of the Silver Crescent
  - Texas title of Admiral in the Texas Navy
  - Washington State Leadership Board, formerly known as the Association of Washington Generals
