= England (surname) =

England is an English and Irish surname.

== People ==
Notable people with the surname include:

=== A ===
- Abraham England (1867–1949), British politician
- Alexander England (born 1986), Australian actor
- Andrew England Kerr (born 1958), British politician
- Anthony England (born 1986), Australian former rugby league footballer
- Anthony W. England (born 1942), American former astronaut
- Arthur England (disambiguation), multiple people
- Audie England (born 1967), American actress and photographer

=== B ===
- Barry England (1932–2009), English novelist and playwright
- Ben England, British choir director
- Benjamin England (1647–1711), English politician
- Bethany England (born 1994), English footballer
- Bob England (1935–1985), American racing driver
- Bobby F. England (born 1932), American politician
- Buddy England, British-born Australian singer and songwriter

=== C ===
- Carder England (1988–2024), American poker player
- Charles England (1921–1999), American pitcher
- Chris England (born 1961) English actor and writer
- Christian England (born 1981), British racing driver
- Christopher J. England (born 1976), American politician

=== D ===
- Daniel England (1868–1948), American businessman, merchant and politician
- Darren England (born 1985), English football referee
- Dave England (born 1969), American stunt performer
- David England (rower) (born 1956), Australian rower
- David England (sprinter) (born c. 1942) Welsh former sprinter

=== E ===
- Edith Mary England (1899–c. 1979 – c. 1981), Australian novelist and poet
- Edward England (c. 1685–1721), Irish pirate
- Edward England (potato importer) (1859–1917), Welsh businessman
- Edward T. England (1869–1934), American lawyer and politician
- Eric England (disambiguation), multiple people
- Ernest England (1927–2012), Australian cricketer and urologist
- Ernie England (1901–1982), English footballer
- Eugene England (1933–2001), American historian, scholar, teacher, and writer

=== F ===
- Forrest England (1912–2002), American football coach and college athletics administrator
- Frances England, American musician

=== G ===
- Gary England (1939–2025), American meteorologist
- George England (disambiguation), multiple people
- Gordon England (disambiguation), multiple people
- Glyn England (1921–2013), British electrical engineer

=== H ===
- Hal England (1932–2003), American actor
- Hannah England (born 1987), British middle-distance runner
- Howard S. England (1914–1999), United States Marine

=== I ===
- Isaac England (born 2008), English footballer

=== J ===
- Jamie England (born 1988), English footballer
- Janis June England, birth name of Jan Steward (1929–2020), American artist, graphic designer, photographer, and writer
- Jennifer England (born 1978), American model and actress
- Jeremy England (born 1982), American physicist
- Jeremy England (politician) (born 1982), American politician
- John England (disambiguation), multiple people
- Julie England (born 1957) American businesswoman and chemical engineer

=== K ===
- Keith England (born 1964), English former rugby league footballer

=== L ===
- Lee England Jr. (born 1984), American violinist
- Lillie England, birth name of Lillie England Lovinggood (1871–1896) American teacher and writer
- Lofty England (1911–1995), Jaguar Cars' motorsport manager in the 1950s, and later company CEO
- Lynndie England (born 1982), a participant in the prisoner abuse incident at Abu Ghraib prison

=== M ===
- Mark England (born 1959), British sports administrator
- Matthew England, Australian climate scientist
- Maud Russell England (1863–1956), New Zealand feminist and teacher
- Michael England (1918–2007), English cricketer
- Mike England (born 1941), Welsh former footballer and manager
- Minnie Throop England (1875–1941), American economist and assistant professor at the University of Nebraska
- Morrison C. England Jr. (born 1954), American judge
- Myles England, American politician

=== N ===
- Natasha England (born 1952), Scottish pop singer
- Nora England (1946–2022), American linguist
- Nora England (artist) (1887–1970), British artist
- Norman England, pseudonym of Godfrey Webb (1914–2003), British author

=== O ===
- Octavia Grace Ritchie England, full name of Octavia Ritchie (1868–1948), Canadian physician and suffragist
- Odette England (born 1975), Australian-British photographer

=== P ===
- Paul England (disambiguation), multiple people
- Paula England (born 1949), American sociologist
- Peter England, birth name of Pete Dunne (born 1993), English professional wrestler
- Philip England (born 1951), British geophysicist
- Poole England (1787–1884)

=== R ===
- Richard England (disambiguation), multiple people
- Robert England (disambiguation), multiple people
- Roye England (1906–1995), founder of Pendon Museum, England
- Rufus Nelson England (1851–1911), Canadian merchant and politician
- Sir Russell England (1899–1970), British-born civil servant, farmer and politician in Botswana
- Ruth England (born 1970), British television presenter and actress

=== S ===
- Sandhurst England (1856–1903), Australian-born New Zealand cricketer
- Sarah K. England, American physiologist and biophysicist
- Stace England, American musician
- Steve England, British disc-jockey and radio producer
- Sue England (1928–2018), American actress

=== T ===
- Terry England (born 1966) American politician
- Thomas Richard England (1790–1847), Irish biographer and priest
- Ty England (born 1963) American guitarist and singer

=== W ===
- Wayne England (died 2016), English artist
- William England (died 1896), British photographer
- William England (priest) (1767–1834), Church of England clergyman

=== Y ===
- Yan England (born 1981 as Yan England-Girard), Canadian actor, film director, producer, screenwriter, and radio and television presenter

== See also ==
- England (disambiguation)
- English monarch, who/se family may be addressed with the pseudo-surname "England"
- General England (disambiguation)
- Justice England (disambiguation)
- Mr England (disambiguation)
