= England (disambiguation) =

England is a country that is part of the United Kingdom. It is often incorrectly used to refer to the whole of the United Kingdom.

England may also refer to:

== Places ==
- Kingdom of England, a sovereign state from the 10th century to 1707
  - English Empire (1570–1707)
  - Angevin Empire (1140–1260)
- England, Arkansas, United States
- England, Nordstrand, Germany

== People ==
- England (surname)
- Mr. England, nickname of English rugby fan Peter Cross (rugby union)
- England captain (disambiguation), the captain of an England national team
- List of English monarchs, who may be referred to as "England"
- England Dan, pseudonym of Dan Seals (1948–2009), American musician

== Culture ==
- England (band), a progressive rock group
- "England", a 2006 song by Justin Hawkins
- "England", a song by Great Big Sea from Fortune's Favour, 2008
- "England", a song by The National from High Violet, 2010
- "England" (Stewart Lee's Comedy Vehicle), a TV episode
- "England's", a song by Tim Smith from Tim Smith's Extra Special OceanLandWorld, 1995
- England: Poems from a School, 2018 book by Kate Clanchy

== Other uses ==
- List of national sports teams of England
- England (British postage stamps)
- England (1813 ship)
- "England", a Series E episode of the television series QI (2007)

== See also ==
- Terminology of the British Isles
- Great Britain, the island England makes up part of
- United Kingdom, the sovereign state that includes England
- New England, a region of the northeastern United States
- New England (disambiguation)
- Mr England (disambiguation)
- Britain (disambiguation)
- English (disambiguation)
