= Henry Edgeworth =

Henry Edgeworth may refer to:

- Henry Edgeworth (MP), for County Longford (Parliament of Ireland constituency) and Mullingar (Parliament of Ireland constituency)
- Henry Essex Edgeworth, Irish priest
