= John England =

John England may refer to:

- John B. England (1923–1954), World War II fighter ace
- John C. England (1920–1941), U.S. Navy officer killed in the attack on Pearl Harbor
- John England (bishop) (1786–1842), first Catholic Bishop of Charleston, South Carolina
- John England (cricketer) (1940–2024), New Zealand cricketer
- John England (engineer) (1822–1877), British civil engineer
- John England (politician) (1911–1985), Administrator of the Northern Territory of Australia and member of the Australian parliament
- John England, catalogue of GUS (retailer)
- John H. England (born 1947), American judge
- John Humphrey England (1817–1887), British grocer, merchant, businessman and entrepreneur

== See also ==
- John of England (1166–1216), King of England
- John England & the Western Swingers, Nashville swing band
