= Mr England =

Mister England, Mr. England or Mr England may refer to:

- Peter Cross (rugby union), nicknamed Mr England, English rugby union fan
- Mister England, a biennial regional male beauty pageant feeder title for competing in Mister World
- Mr. England, an annual male bodybuilding competition title for the UK's National Amateur Body-Builders' Association
- Mr. England, a man with the surname England

== See also ==
- England (disambiguation)
- MR (disambiguation)
