= Fort Zachary Taylor =

Historic fort in Florida, US

- U.S. National Register of Historic Places
- U.S. National Historic Landmark
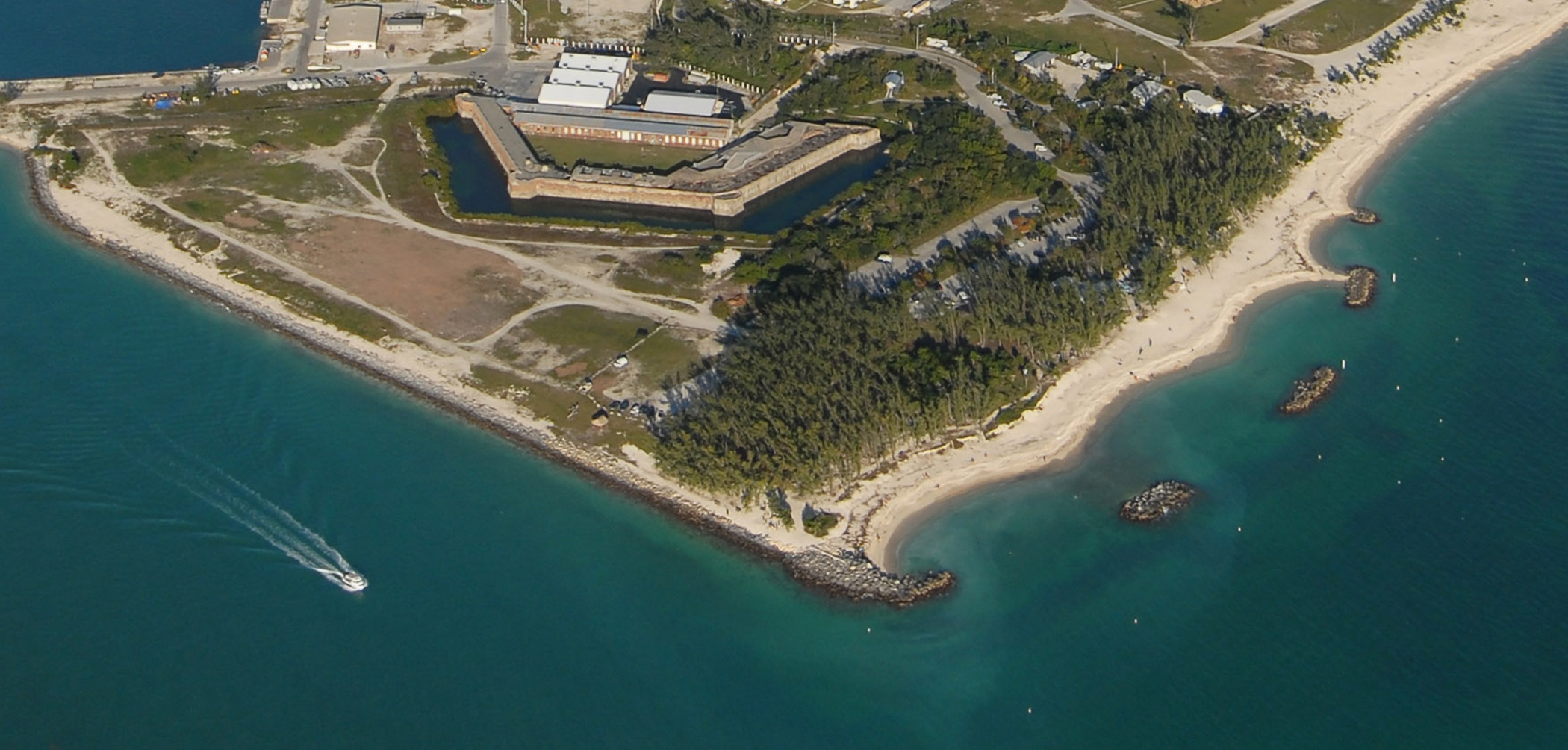
- Aerial view of Fort Zachary Taylor State Park

- Location within Florida Location within the United States
- Interactive map of Fort Zachary Taylor
- Location: Monroe County, Florida, USA
- Nearest city: Key West, Florida
- Coordinates: 24°32′48″N 81°48′38″W
- NRHP reference No.: 71000244

Significant dates
- Added to NRHP: March 11, 1971
- Designated NHL: May 31, 1973

The Fort Zachary Taylor Historic State Park, also known simply as Fort Taylor, is a Florida State Park and National Historic Landmark centered on a Civil War-era fort located near the southern tip of Key West, Florida.

== History ==
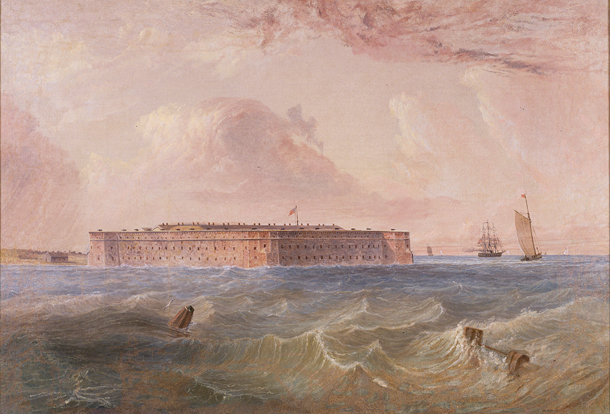
Fort Taylor, Florida by Seth Eastman (1808–1875)

=== 1845–1900 ===
Construction of the fort began in 1845 as part of a mid-19th century plan to defend the southeast coast of the United States through a series of forts after the War of 1812. Thompson Island, at the southwest tip of Key West, was selected as the site for the fort in 1822 and plans drawn up by Simon Bernard and Joseph G. Totten were approved in 1836. Two supporting artillery batteries, Martello Towers, provided additional coverage, one of which exists today as the Martello Gallery-Key West Art and Historical Museum. The fort was named for United States President Zachary Taylor in November 1850, a few months after his sudden death in office.

The United States Army Corps of Engineers leased slaves from local slave-owners for construction of the fort and its neighbor Fort Jefferson. This resulted in an influx of enslaved peoples into the immediate area as, before the construction of the fort, there were no large agricultural ventures and thus not a high demand for slaves, marine salvage being the main industry. By some estimates, the number more than quadrupled from fewer than 90 enslaved people in Key West before construction to over 400 after.

The fort's foundation consists of oolitic limestone and New England granite. Its 5-foot (1.5 m) thick walls rose 50 feet (15 m) above mean low water and included two tiers of casemates with a terreplein or barbette at the top. Three seaward curtains 495 feet (151 m) between bastions, each containing 42 guns on three levels, were augmented by a land-facing gorge. Troop barracks were built into this gorge with a capacity for 800 men. At either end of the barracks was a large gunpowder magazine while a sally port was located in the center, connected to land by a 1,200-foot (366 m) causeway. Rainwater was collected in underground cisterns along the perimeter of the fort. Yellow fever epidemics and material shortages slowed construction of the fort, which continued throughout the 1850s. The Pensacola, Florida, firm of Raiford and Abercrombie provided bricks for Fort Zachary Taylor and Fort Jefferson, which was under construction at the same time.

Even before the onset of the American Civil War in April 1861, the United States government recognized the importance of holding Fort Taylor if the Southern states seceded. An official report to the United States Secretary of War on December 28, 1860, stated that: "Lieutenant-General Scott will further ask the attention of the Secretary to Forts Jefferson and Taylor, which are wholly national, being of far greater value even to the most distant points of the Atlantic coast ... than to the State of Florida. There is only a feeble company at Key West for the defense of Fort Taylor." At midnight on January 13, 1861, Union Captain John Milton Brannan moved his 44 men of the 1st U.S. Artillery Regiment from Key West Barracks to Fort Taylor. Despite having no orders to do so, Captain Brannan took the initiative in manning the fort to prevent it from falling into Confederate hands. It became a key outpost for threatening blockade runners during the Union blockade. Major William H. French arrived in April 1861 with his artillery unit.

In 1898, the fort was reduced to two stories and Battery Osceola was added to the south casemate. The battery consisted of two 12-inch M1895 guns. The Civil War-era guns were used as fill, being buried within the new battery to save on materials. Battery Adair was added to the west casemate and included four 3-inch M1898 15-pounder rapid-fire rifles.

The fort was heavily used again during the Spanish–American War (1898), World War I (1917–1918), World War II (1941–1945), and the Cuban Missile Crisis (1962).

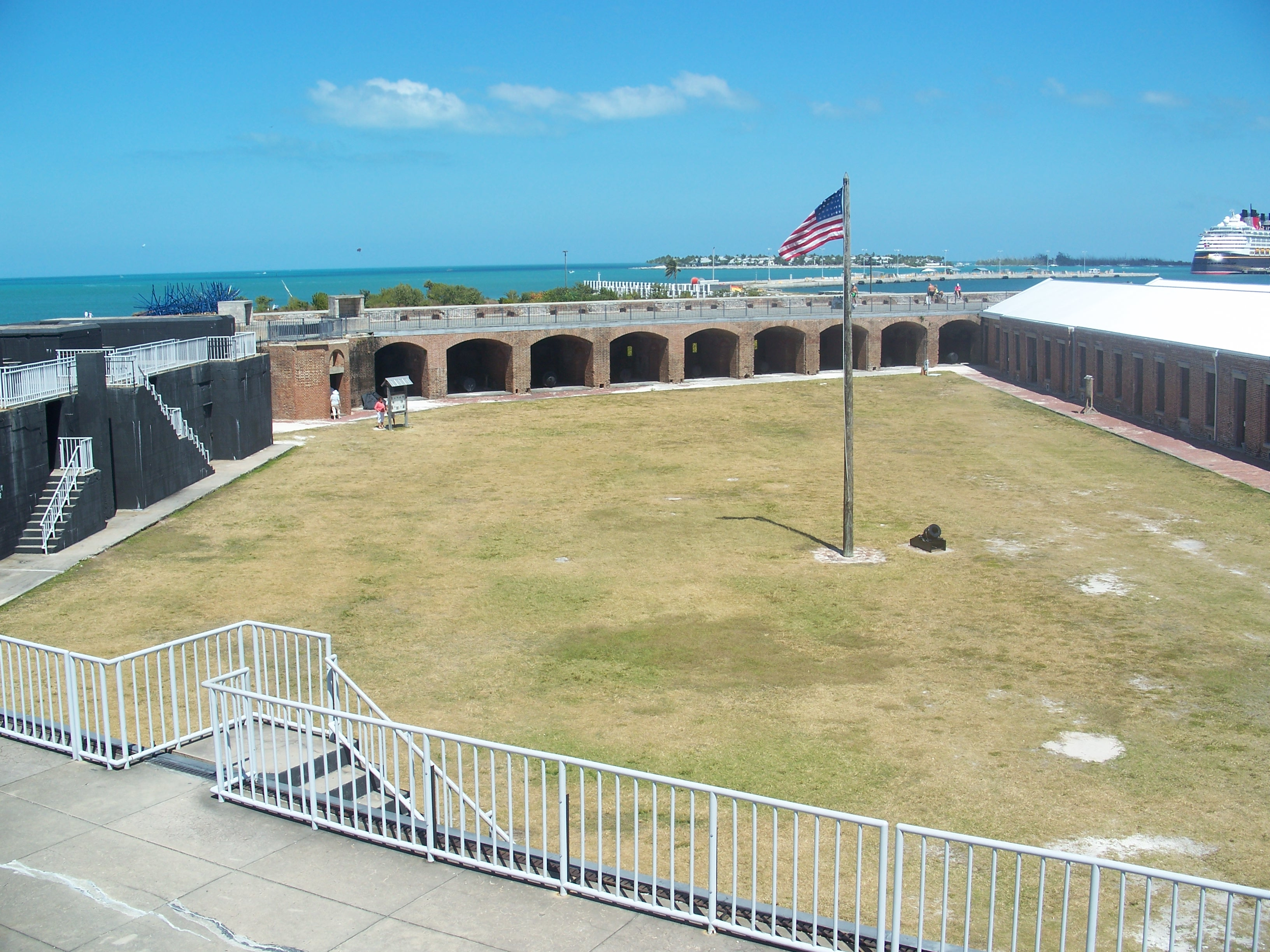
Fort Zachary Taylor Parade Ground as seen from Battery Osceola, with the Civil War barracks on the right, the North Curtain rooms in the background, and Battery Adair on the left.

=== 1947–present ===
No longer of use to the U.S. Army, the fort was turned over to the United States Navy in 1947 for maintenance. In 1968, volunteers led by Howard S. England excavated Civil War guns and ammunition buried in long-abandoned parts of the fort to form what would be considered the nation's largest collection of Civil War cannons. Fort Taylor was placed on the National Register of Historic Places in 1971 and designated a National Historic Landmark in 1973. Three years later, in 1976, Fort Zachery Taylor was donated to the State of Florida and opened up to the public in 1985. Due to the filling in of land around the fort, including the creation of an attractive stretch of beach, the park now occupies 87 acres (35 ha).

==== Truman Annex ====
The fort's land closer to downtown Key West became part of the Truman Annex to Naval Air Station Key West. It was originally a separate major installation known as Naval Station Key West and, until it closed in 1974, included a submarine base.

President Harry S. Truman used Naval Station Key West as his Winter White House for a total of 175 days over 11 visits. The United States Secret Service had a private beach (eventually named after Truman) built on the land.

Naval Station Key West was decommissioned in 1974 as part of post-Vietnam War force reductions because the U.S. Navy had decommissioned nearly all of its diesel-electric submarines and nuclear-powered submarines were too large for the naval station's port. Most of the former naval station became an annex (the Truman Annex) to Naval Air Station (NAS) Key West and served as the landing point for many Cubans during the 1980 Mariel boatlift of Cuban refugees. Those buildings in the Truman Annex and associated real estate not retained by the Navy as part of NAS Key West were sold to private developers. A museum for the Truman White House was built and the Navy continues to own and maintain the piers and that portion of the former Naval Station Key West property to the North of Fort Taylor, which it uses primarily to support of Joint Interagency Task Force South (JIATF-S). The site also supported Naval Security Group Activity Key West (NAVSECGRUACT KEY WEST) until NAVSECGRUACT's decommissioning in 1996.

== Current uses ==
In addition to the role of the fort and its adjacent beach as tourist attractions, Fort Taylor is also the location of a number of annual events, including week-long Civil War reenactments.

== Gallery ==
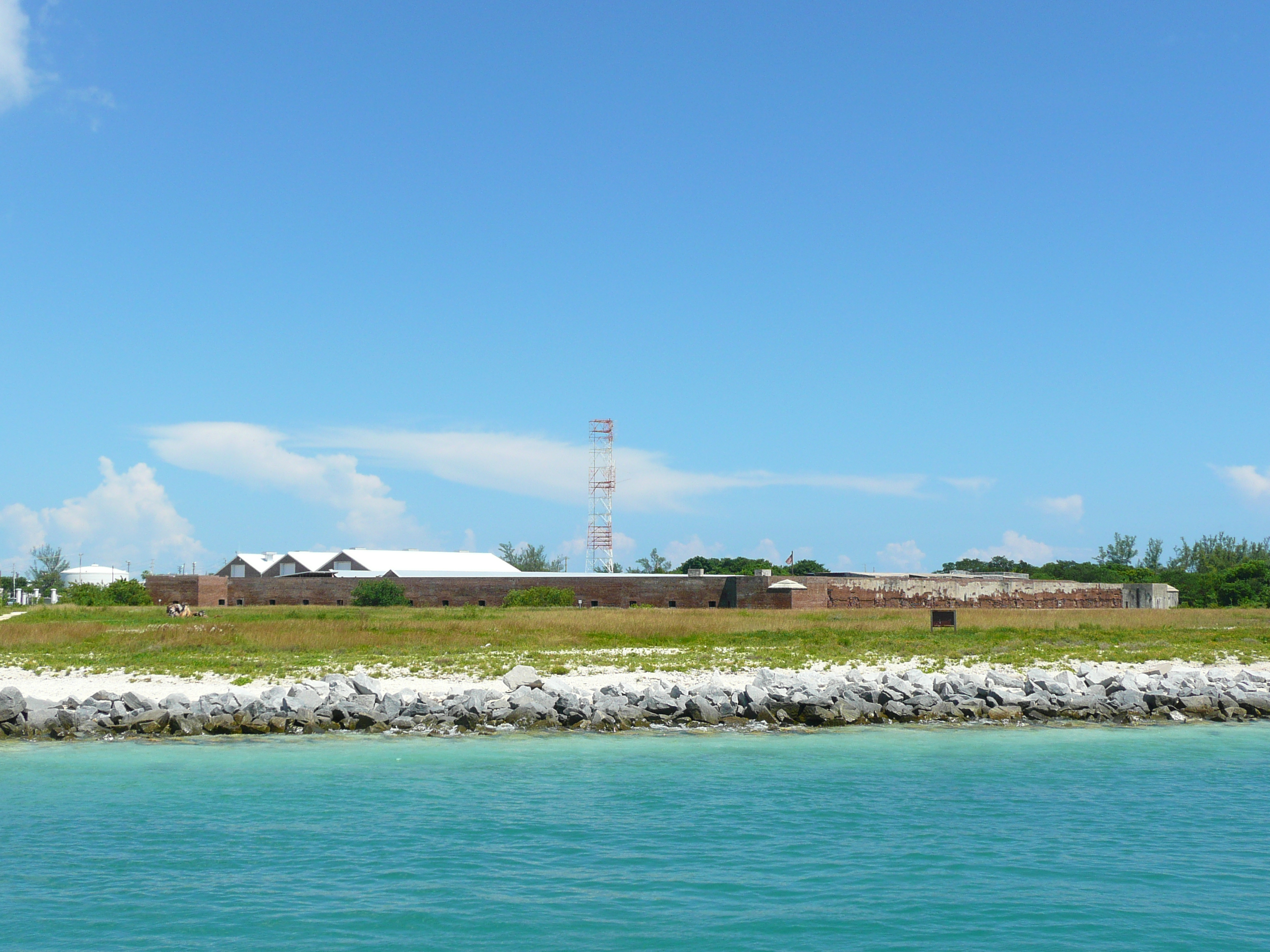
The fort as seen from the Gulf of Mexico

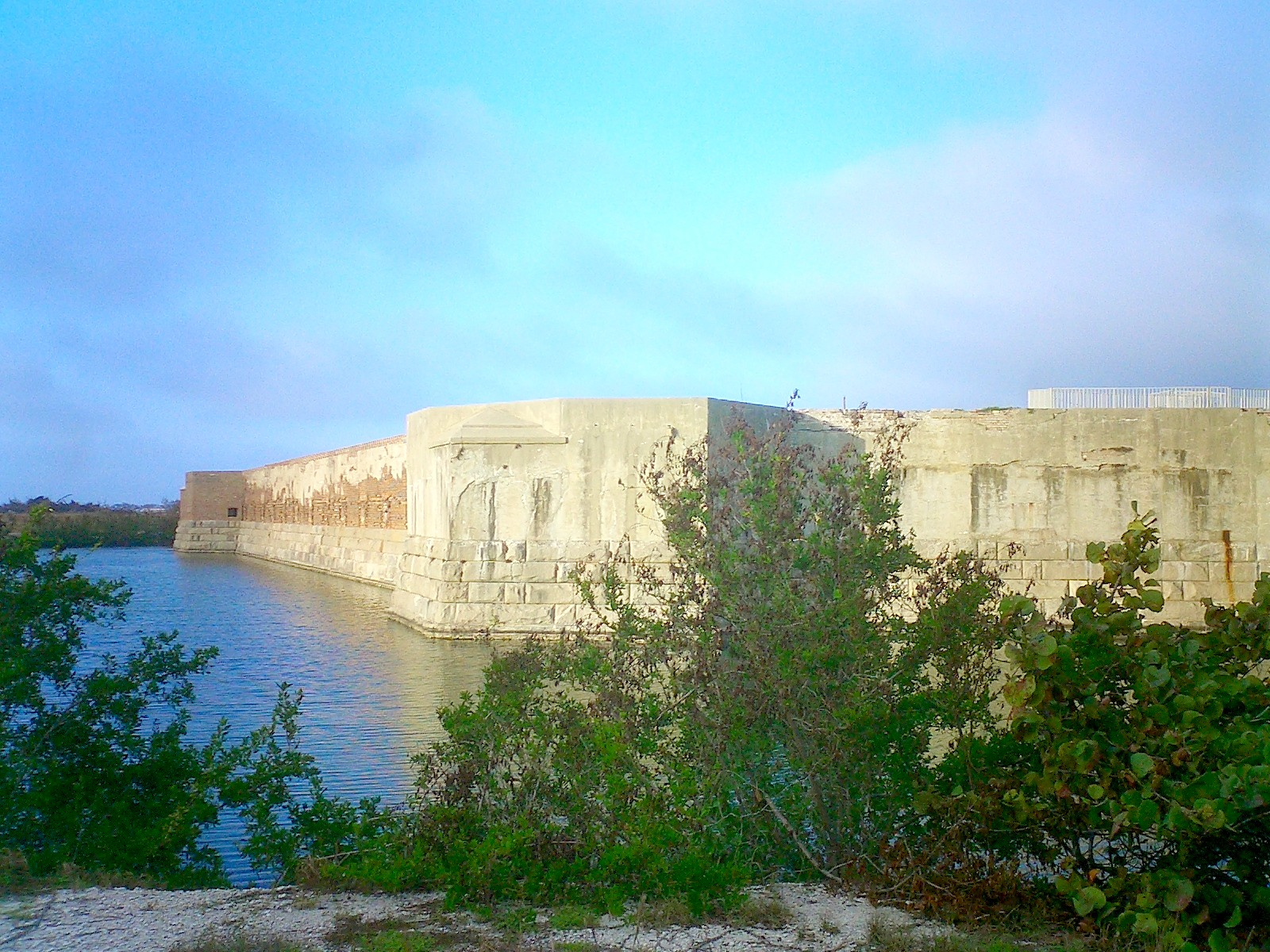
Outside view of the fort showing the moat

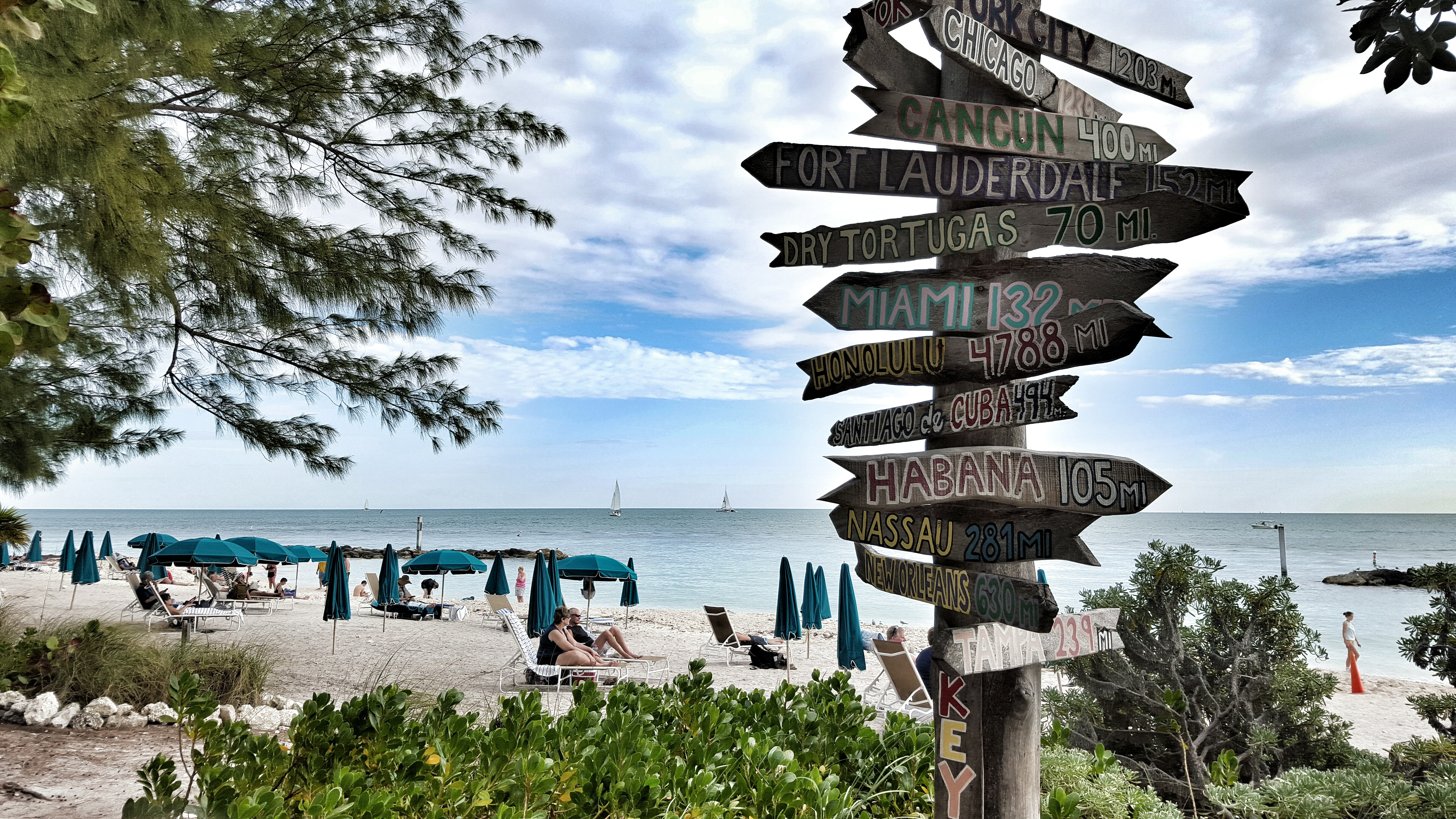
Sign overlooking the picnic area and beach

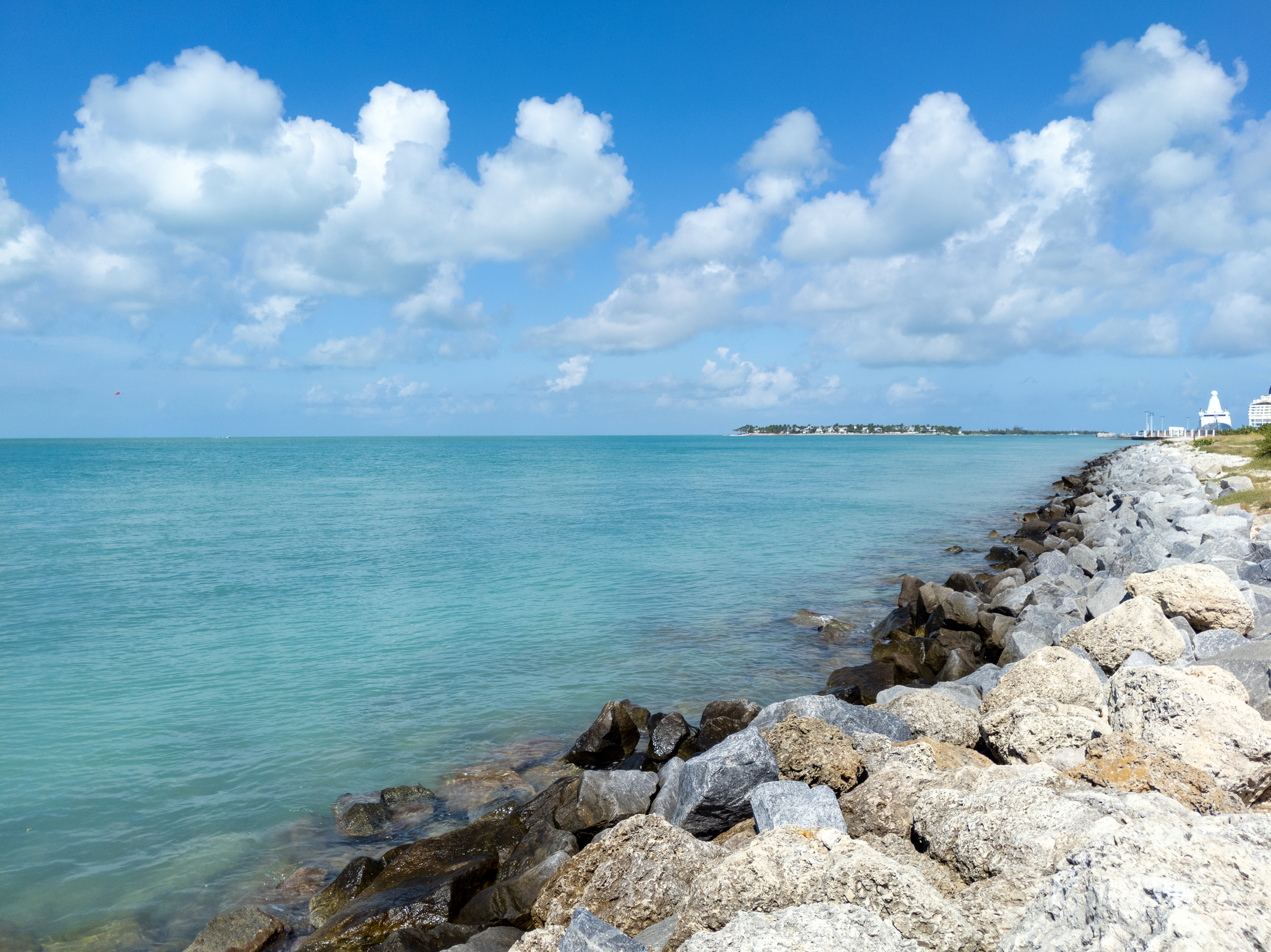
Shoreline and the Gulf

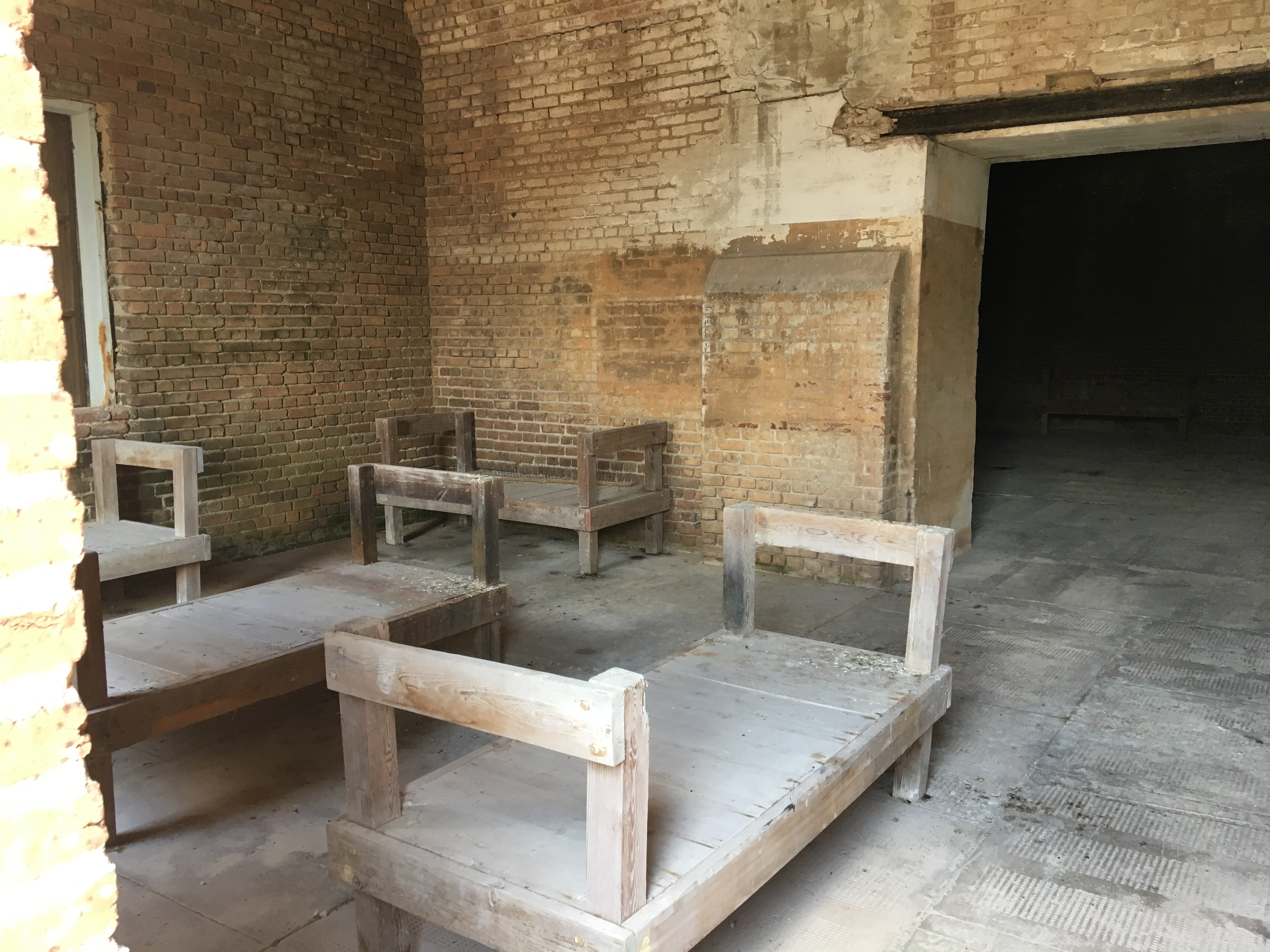
Inside the barracks

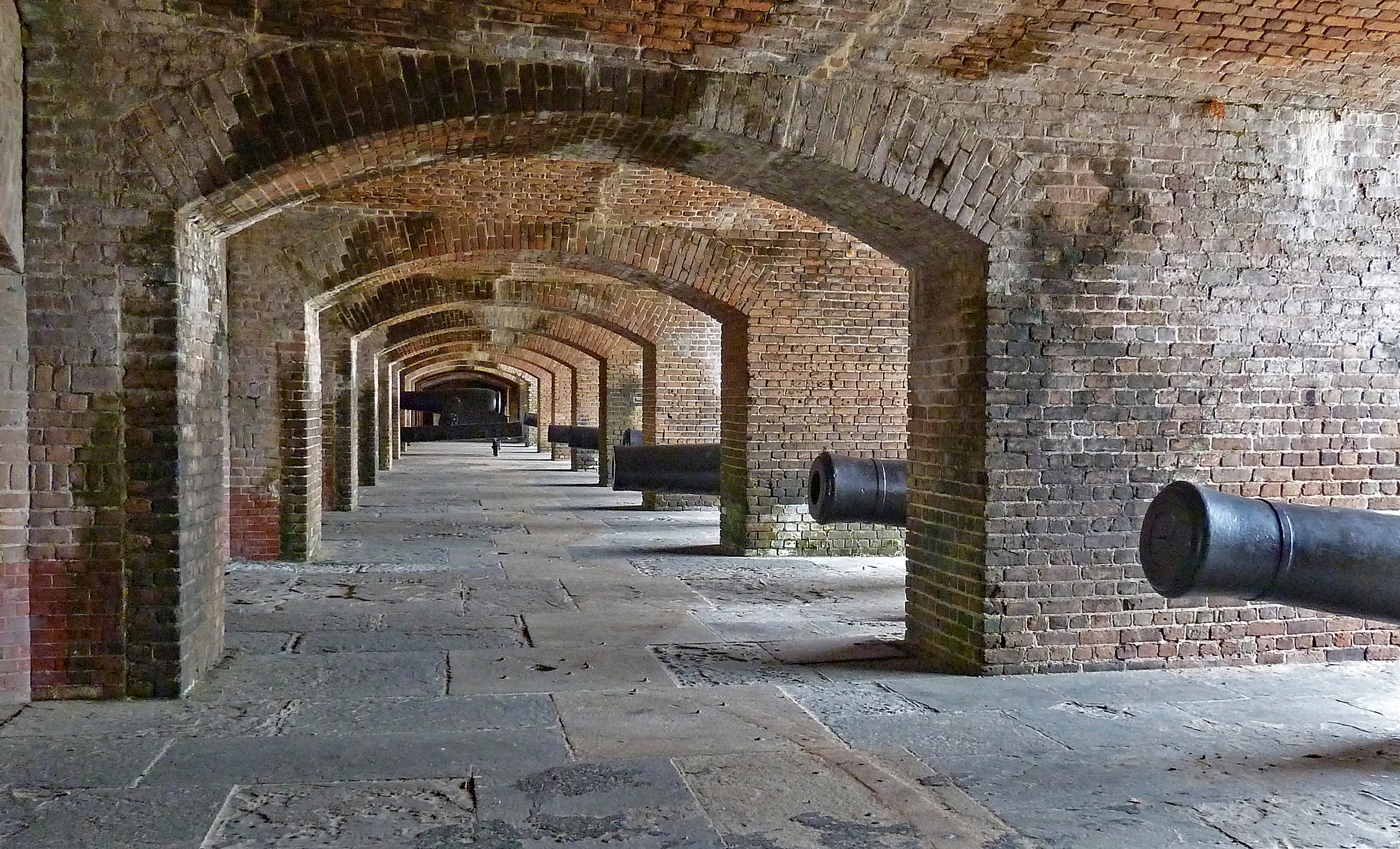
Cannons inside the fort

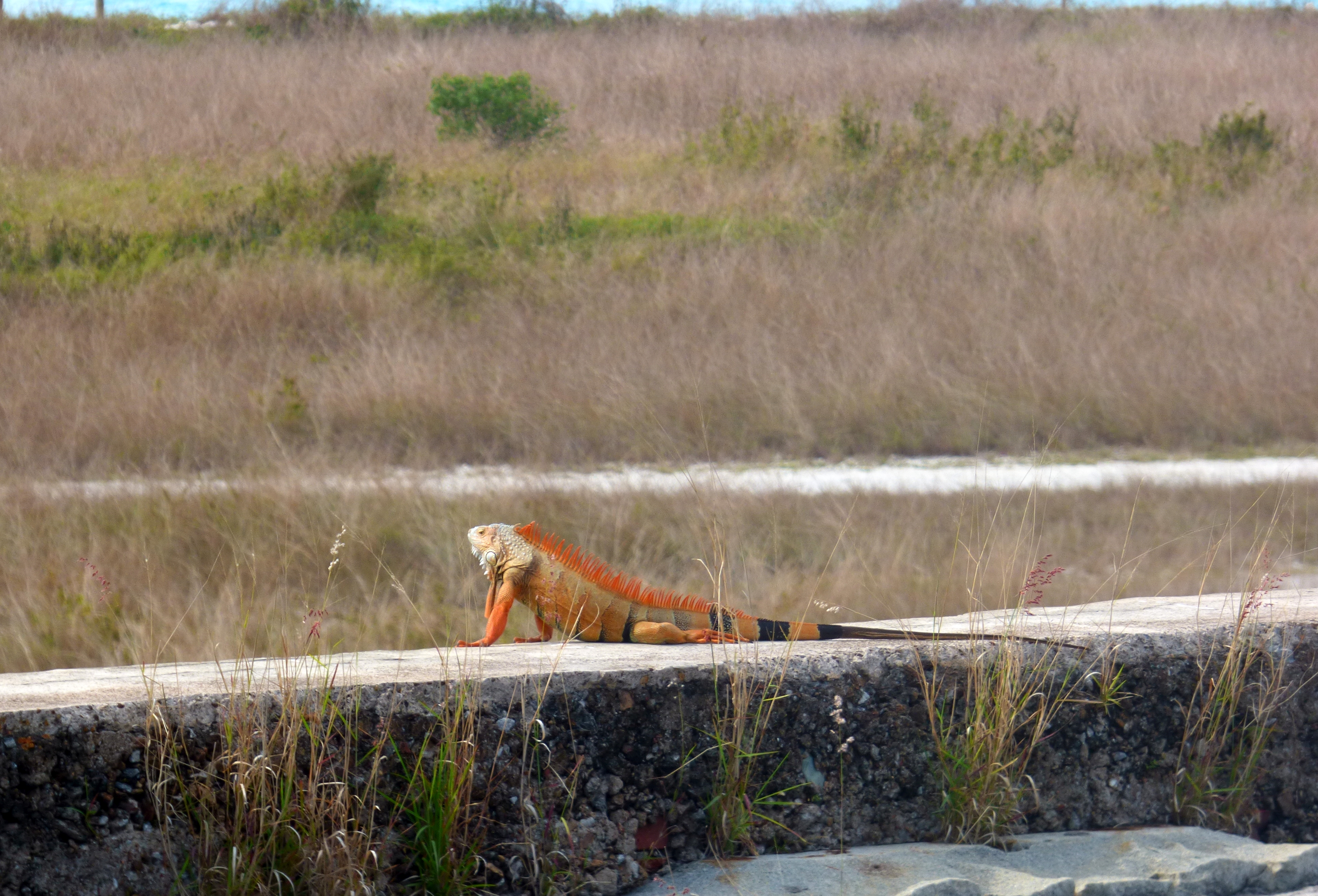
Iguana perched atop the outer wall of the fort

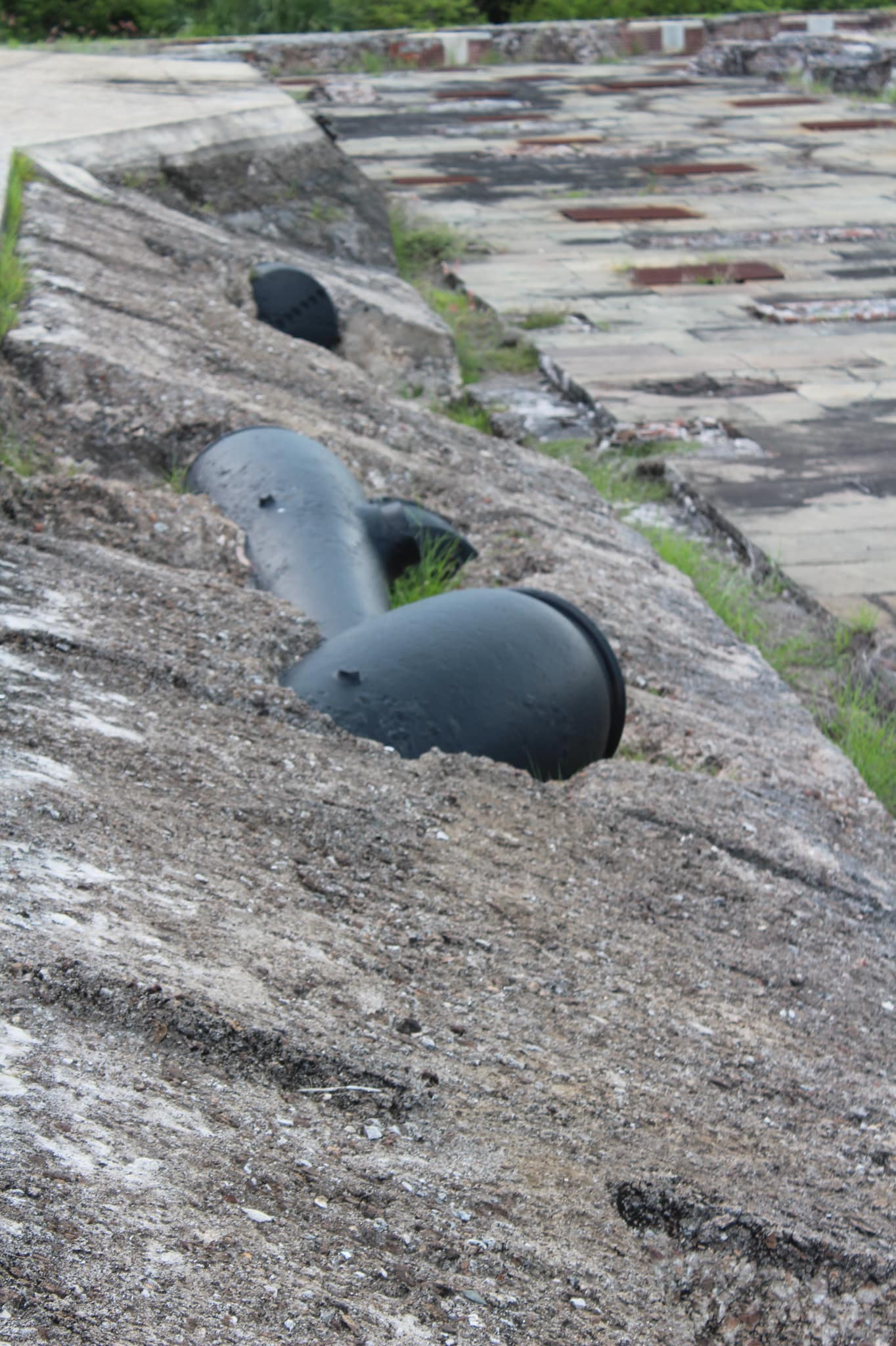
Cannons excavated from abandoned parts of the fort
