= George England (disambiguation) =

George England (1812–1885) was an English businessman.

George England may also refer to:

- George England (divine), English divine and author
- George England (organ builder), English organ builder
- George Pike England (1765–1816), his son, organ builder
- George Allan England (1877–1937), American writer and explorer
- George England and Co. English locomotive manufacturing company
