= Ken Baily =

Football mascot

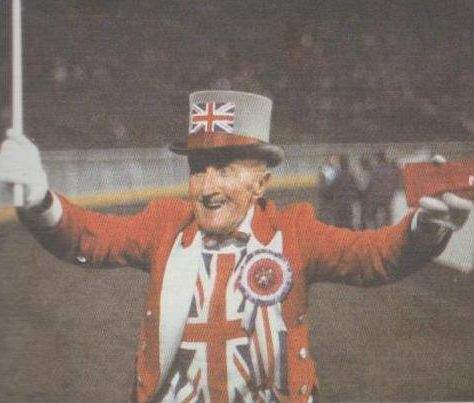
- Born: Kenneth Henry Highett Baily; 8 August 1911; Burnham-on-Sea
- Died: 10 December 1993 (aged 82); Bournemouth
- Occupation: Football mascot
- Years active: 1963–1990

Ken Baily was a self-proclaimed mascot and fan for the England national football team from the 1950s until 1990.

== Life ==
Born in Burnham-on-Sea in 1911, Baily first became notable for his feats in long-distance running; with two team-mates, he "ran to America" by jogging on an ocean liner from Southampton to New York City in 1939.

Baily moved to Bournemouth in the 1930s, and became secretary of the local athletics club, a position he held for 17 years until his retirement in 1953. His most notable triumph on track was winning the 1947 Swanage Marathon.

Baily's development as mascot came with his appearances at the Burnham Carnival, his first of note being in 1950, when he dressed as Winston Churchill and was featured on television. He became member number 2 of the England Supporters' Association on its foundation in 1963, when he first seems to have adopted his costume, a John Bull-style outfit incorporating Union Jack hat and waistcoat, for an England international in Paris, and presented a toy poodle to the French team before the match as a gesture of friendship. He became a familiar figure (especially after the 1966 World Cup) wearing at most England matches, and was also prominent at FA Cup finals. Baily's fame was such that he was depicted as a Subbuteo figure in 1972.

He also attended rugby football internationals, most notably protecting the modesty of Erika Roe after her pitch invasion at Twickenham Stadium in 1982 with his flag. Baily also lent support to Great Britain against the Australian Rugby League Kangaroos in the 1982 Test series.

One of Baily's last appearances in his patriotic outfit was for an England match in Dublin in November 1990. Baily was attacked by Irish fans throwing stones and bottles after he waved to them from his hotel balcony.

Baily died of heart failure at the Bramley House Nursing Home in Bournemouth on 10 December 1993.
