= Justice English =

Justice English may refer to:

- Elbert H. English (1816–1884), associate justice of the Arkansas Supreme Court
- John W. English (1831–1916), associate justice of the Supreme Court of Appeals of West Virginia

== See also ==
- Justice England (disambiguation)
