= Dudley Thornton =

British soldier (1919–2009)

Dudley Edwin Thornton
- Born: 1 May 1919; Reigate, Surrey, England
- Died: 22 April 2009 (aged 89); Melton Mowbray, Leicestershire, England
- Burial place: Burton Lazars, Leicestershire, England
- Military career
- Allegiance: United Kingdom
- Branch: British Army
- Service years: 1939–1974
- Rank: Colonel
- Commands: 18th Battalion of the King's African Rifles
- Conflicts: World War II
- Awards: Commander of the British Empire
- Other work: Chairman of the Welch Regiment Museum, in Cardiff

Colonel Dudley Edwin Thornton, CBE, ERD (1 May 1919 – 22 April 2009) was a British soldier, who commanded the 18th Battalion of the King's African Rifles during the Burma Campaign, and was chairman of the Welch Regiment Museum, in Cardiff, from 1974 until his death.

== Biography ==
Dudley Edwin Thornton was born in Reigate, Surrey, on 1 May 1919. Thornton was educated, and brought up, in Bristol. Shortly before the outbreak of World War II, Thornton joined the Supplementary Reserve and was commissioned into the Welch Regiment as a second lieutenant. For the first few years of the war, Thornton served in the anti-invasion forces, on the south coast. In 1943, he was sent to East Africa to join the 18th Battalion of the King's African Rifles. He spent the remainder of the war taking part in the Burma Campaign. When the War ended, he returned to serving with the Welch Regiment overseas, in Hong Kong, Singapore, Cyprus and Libya, before becoming the last Commanding Officer of the regimental depot in Cardiff and then Deputy Commander of the Welsh Brigade at Cwrt-y-Gollen, near Crickhowell.

He was appointed a CBE for his special contribution to the Malawi Army. He greatly enjoyed being back with soldiers he had fought with 20 years earlier, and commanded the army between 1965 and 1967. At the time, colonial rule had just ended, and Dr Hastings Banda had become the country's first president. His interest in military history was also put to good use in designing many of the emblems for the new republic.

He went on to other overseas postings in Europe and the Far East before retiring in 1974 to live in Burton Lazars, Leicestershire, with his wife. Throughout his life he had a strong interest in military history and assembled a small collection of medals, badges and other militaria. He never really parted company with his regiment as almost immediately on retiring from the regular army he became a trustee and chairman of the Welch Regiment Museum in Cardiff Castle and remained deeply involved with it right up to the time of his death on 22 April 2009, 9 days before his 90th birthday.

== Personal life ==
Thornton married Elizabeth Joan England in 1940. They had three children. Joan was a daughter of Captain John Humphrey England, and a granddaughter of Edward England.
