= Maud Russell England =

New Zealand teacher and feminist

Maud Russell England (30 December 1863 – 12 May 1956) was a New Zealand teacher, feminist, educationalist and art dealer. She was born in Rugby, Warwickshire, England on 30 December 1863.
