= Minnie Throop England =

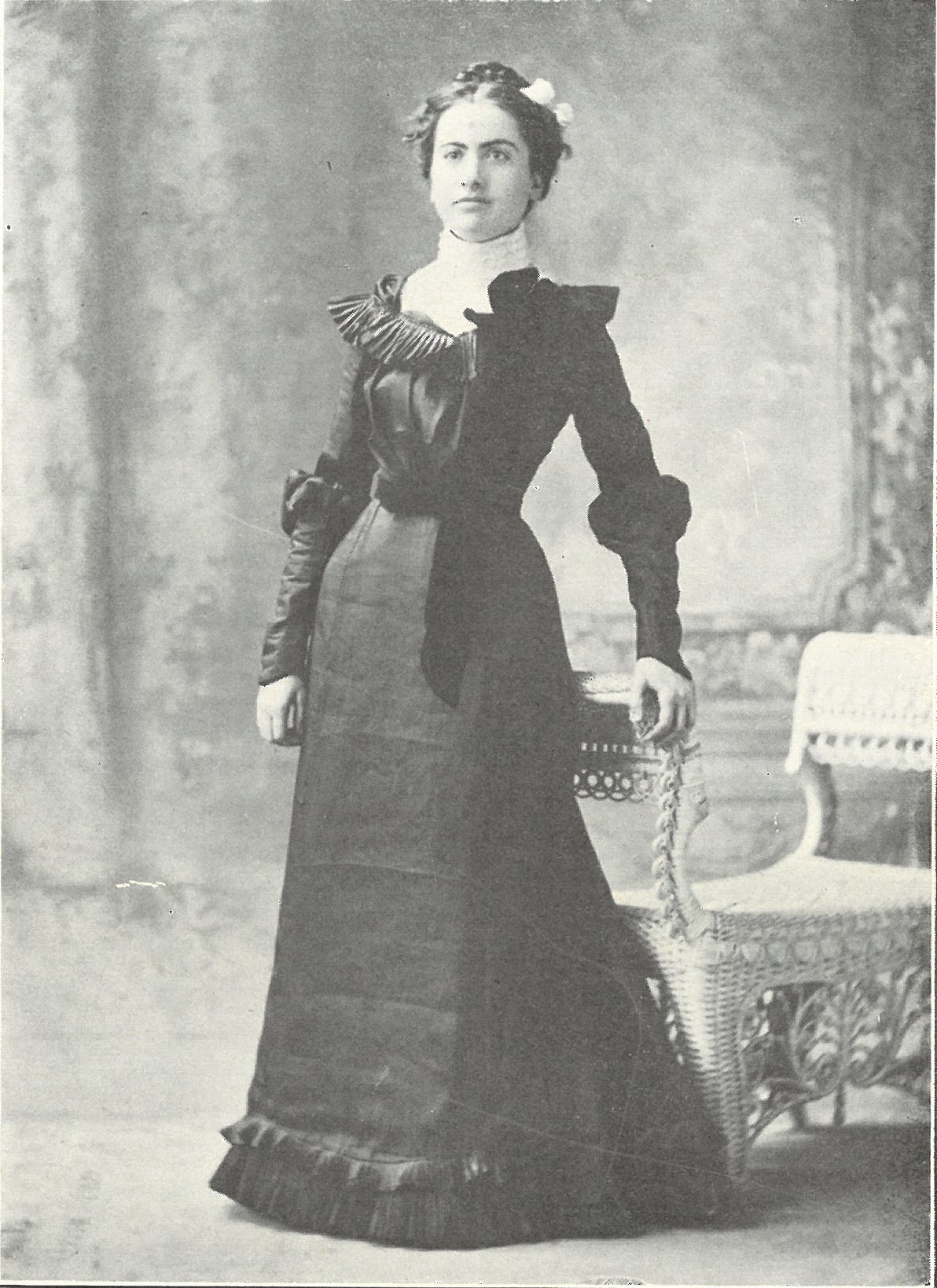
Minnie Throop England as pictured in Nebraska Wesleyan University's 1903 yearbook

Minnie Throop England (1876 - 1941) was an economist and an assistant professor at the University of Nebraska from 1906 to 1921. Prior to World War I, England published many articles related to the field of monetary economics and economic fluctuations, challenging the common stereotype that the focus of early female economists was primarily on gender issues or labor economics. From 1912 to 1915, she presented her analysis of entrepreneurial promotion of new enterprises as the cause of crises in the business cycle in four major articles in the Quarterly Journal of Economics and the Journal of Political Economy. She was an important critic of Irving Fisher's monetary theory of fluctuations.

== Early life and education ==
Minnie Ethel Throop was born in Valparaiso, Nebraska, to Henry E. & Ellen M. (Johnson) Throop. Her mother came from a prominent Nebraska family who had claimed a homestead near Valparaiso in 1865 and helped to develop the town. Her grandfather Andrew Johnson was a skilled carpenter who worked on the first building on the University of Nebraska campus as well as on the first capitol building in Lincoln. Her sister, Nellie Throop Magee, took over and successfully ran Magee's clothing store in Lincoln after the death of her husband, O.N. Magee. Minnie Throop England's uncle, A.L. Johnson, was a prominent businessman and philanthropist. Her aunt, Olive Johnson, married Charles Clark White, who started Crete Mills in Crete, Nebraska, where the business has operated continuously into the 21st century. White also served on the board of Nebraska Wesleyan University in its early years. Three current and former buildings on the Nebraska Wesleyan campus were named for members of Minnie Throop England's family: the C.C. White building, Magee Stadium, and Johnson Hall.

England graduated from Nebraska Wesleyan University in 1903 and married classmate William "Harry" England, who went on to doctoral study in economics at the University of Nebraska. In 1906, England also received her Ph.D. from the University of Nebraska. At university, she studied with William George Langworthy Taylor, who published the “Kinetic Theory of Economic Crises” in 1904 in the University of Nebraska University Studies.

== Career ==
After England graduated from the University of Nebraska, she taught economics as an assistant professor there. Her dissertation “Church Government and Church Control” was never published, and was unrelated to her later scholarship.

The majority of England's works were published before 1915. Her main scholarly foci were monetary economics and economic fluctuations. Her work on crises and cycles appeared after the publication of Irving Fisher's "Purchasing Power of Money" in 1911. During this remarkable period of research on monetary and cycle theory, England published several articles, such as "Fisher's Theory of Crises: A Criticism" in 1912 and "An Analysis of the Crisis Cycle" in 1913. Her work was recognized by several leading economists such as Fisher and Joseph Schumpeter. During 1912 to 1915, she published several articles in the Quarterly Journal of Economics and the Journal of Political Economy.

Although England's research output and her publication of economic articles was on a par with professors in the same department, she was never promoted due to the political atmosphere of the department during World War I. In 1919, she left the university.

The present-day Department of Economics and College of Business at University of Nebraska-Lincoln jointly host the England-Clark Conference to highlight emerging research in economics. The event is named in part for Dr. Minnie England.

== Written works ==
=== "Statistical Inquiry into the Influence of Credit Upon the Level of Price" (1907) ===
The main focus of this paper was to "determine the relationship between credit and short-time fluctuations between gold and prices". The paper was divided into three parts: the rise of price, the fall of price, and an analysis of the movement of commodity prices. This article was reviewed by Irving Fisher in 1908 in Yale Review, and Fisher commented on the novelty of the method used by England. Fisher noted that England's method of measurement "consists in noting the years of lowest and highest points for prices, clearings, loans, note circulation, deposits, etc. It is found that beginning with the lowest point of depression following a crisis, clearings which are taken as a good index of the amount of credit used in transactions begin to increase before the commodity prices rather than the increase of prices being a cause of the increase in clearings".

=== "Fisher's Theory of Crises: A Criticism" (1912) ===
In this article, England critiqued the theory of Crises in The Purchasing Power of Money by Irving Fisher. She held that “the greater part of the literature on the subject of crises is disheartening reading because of the vagueness of the terms employed and the care with which the crucial question is evaded, – what brings prosperity to a halt?... An examination of five crises in Germany and six in England does not bring to light any uniform tendency for interest as a cost of production to lag behind prices,”. She also stated that “sometimes a crisis occurs even though virtual [i.e. real] interest rates are abnormally low, as in 1873 in Germany and England, or in 1900 in the latter country” and that “prosperity may continue for several years after virtual interest rates are high, as in the crisis of 1883 in England”. “It looks as if it could more properly be said that the rapid rise of virtual interest rates was due to the stoppage of prosperity, than that the check to prosperity comes from the rise of virtual interest rates”. This was only the second time an article by a woman author had been published in the Quarterly Journal of Economics.

=== "An Analysis of the Crisis Cycle" (1913) ===
In this paper, England's argues that the "industrial cycle was driven by the demand for goods. Increased demand for goods during the prosperity phase of the cycle was due to promotion, that is, from efforts to procure capital goods to enlarge industries and to establish new ones. The demand [for] new and expanding companies for capital goods raised the price of such goods and hence the profits of their producers. Increased demand for consumption of goods was a consequence of prosperity, not its cause". Furthermore, she holds that there are three possible causes for an industrial crisis: (1) " investors have taken all the risks they care to assume".; (2) "banks refuse to increase their loans further given their capital and reserves"; or (3) “because distrust has been awakened regarding the future course of enterprise,” that is, a revision of expectations of future profitability.

=== "Promotion as the Cause of Crises" (1915) ===
In this article, England attempts to show that "even when prosperity is not interrupted by extraneous causes such as natural calamities (crop failure, fires, floods, and so on) or by political disturbances, threat of wars, and the like, active promotion, the cause of rising prosperity, still sets in operation forces which lead to a financial crisis, tend to check promotion activity, and cause a return to a condition of depression such as characterized the beginning of the period". England argues that crises are the price of progress, which means that the more rapid the progress, the more severe the crises. Her theory of promotion is similar to Schumpeter's view of the role of innovating entrepreneurs in cycles and development.
