= General England =

General England may refer to:

- Poole England (1787–1884), British Army general
- Richard England (British Army officer, born 1793) (1793–1883), British Army general
- Richard G. England (c. 1750–1812), British Army lieutenant general
