= Henry Essex Edgeworth =

Irish clergyman

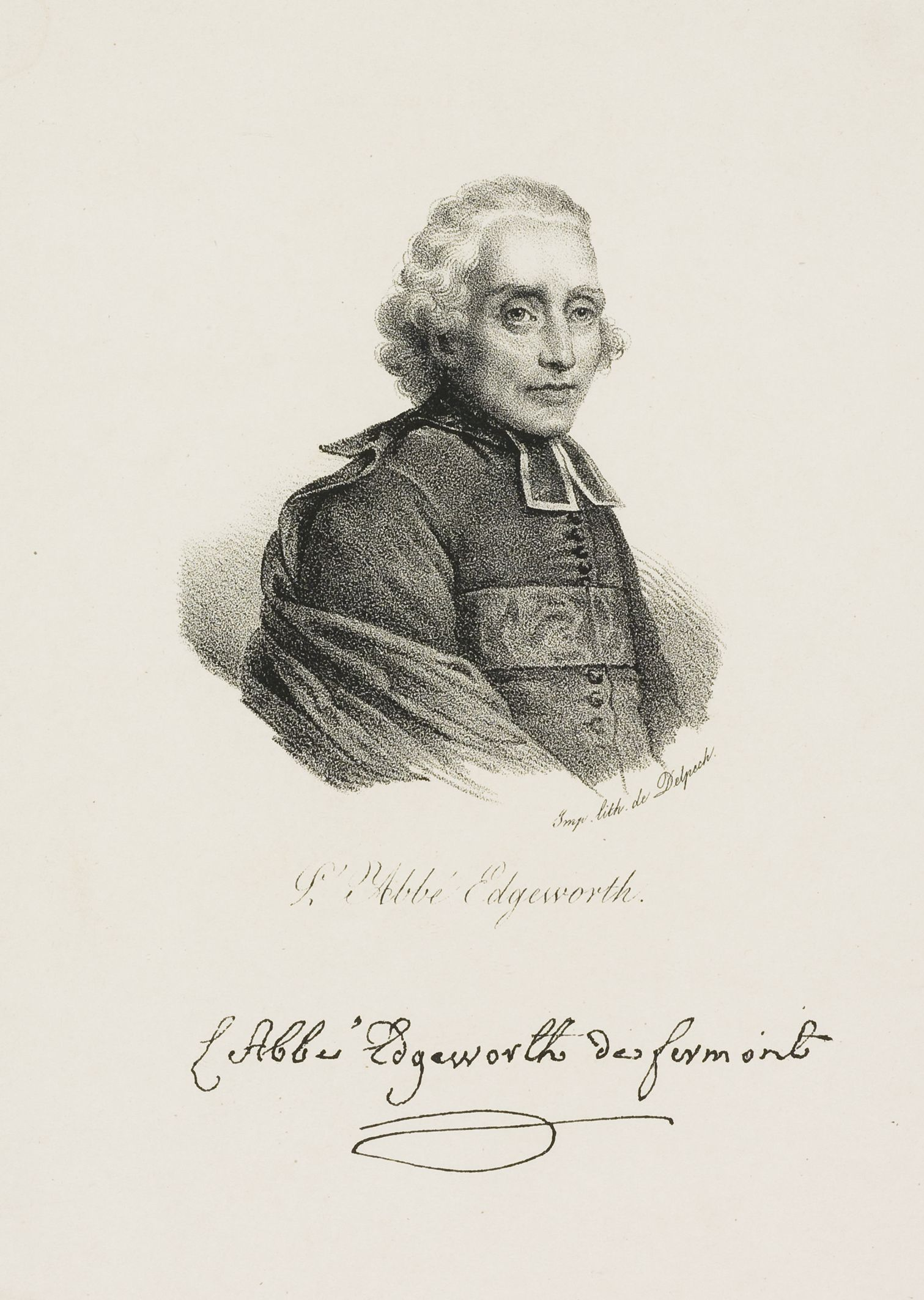
- French illiustration of Edgeworth
- Born: 1745; Edgeworthstown, County Longford, Ireland
- Died: 22 May 1807 (aged 61–62)
- Known for: Confessor of Louis XVI

Henry Essex Edgeworth (1745 – 22 May 1807) was an Irish clergyman who was the confessor of Louis XVI.

== Life ==
He was born in Edgeworthstown, County Longford, Ireland, the son of Robert Edgeworth, the Church of Ireland rector of Edgeworthstown. His mother Martha Ussher is often referred to as a granddaughter of Archbishop Ussher, but was in fact drawn from a different branch of that family. When he was about four, his father converted to Roman Catholicism, resigned his living and emigrated to Toulouse, where the boy was brought up by the Jesuits. In 1769, after his father's death, he went to Paris to be trained for the priesthood. On taking orders he assumed the additional surname of de Firmont, from the family estate of Firmount near Edgeworthstown.

Though he originally studied with a view to becoming a missionary, he decided to remain in Paris, devoting himself especially to the Irish and English Roman Catholics. Through his father and the Archbishop of Paris he became vicar-general of the diocese of Paris and friend of the royal family and stayed with them during the French Revolution.

In 1791 he became confessor to Madame Élisabeth, sister of Louis XVI, and earned the respect even of the sans-culottes by his courage and devotion. By Madame Elizabeth he was recommended to the king when Louis' trial was impending; and after Louis' condemnation to death he was able to obtain permission to celebrate Mass for him and attend him on the scaffold, where he recommended the king to allow his hands to be tied, with the words: "Sire, in this new outrage I see only the last trait of resemblance between your Majesty and the God who will be your reward." It is said that at the moment of the execution, the confessor uttered the celebrated words: "Son of St Louis, ascend to heaven" (although this is disputed; Edgeworth himself, in his memoirs, could neither affirm nor deny them).

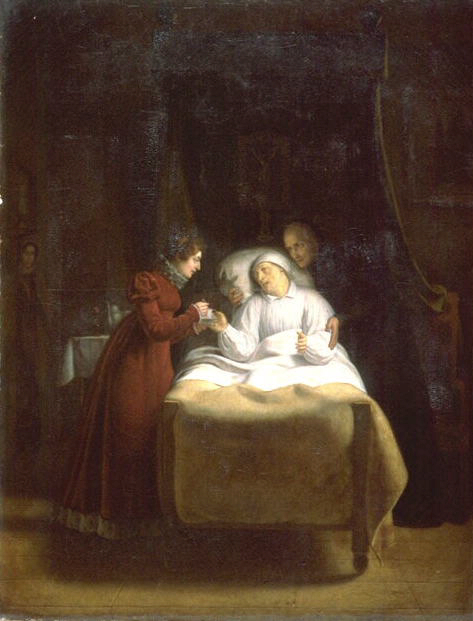
A painting depicting the Duchess of Angoulême at Edgeworth's death bed, by Alexandre-Toussaint Menjaud, 1817.

In spite of the danger he now ran, Edgeworth refused to leave France so long as he could be of any service to Madame Elizabeth, with whom he still managed to correspond. At length, in 1795, his mother having meanwhile died in prison, where his sister was also confined, he succeeded in escaping to England, then Scotland, carrying with him Elizabeth's last message to her brother, the future King Charles X whom he found in Edinburgh. Henry's brother, Ussher, who resided near Edgeworthstown, along with relatives there (including novelist Maria Edgeworth), were keen for him to return to Ireland. Instead, he went with some papers to Monsieur (Louis XVIII) at Blankenburg in Brunswick, by whom he was induced to accompany him to Mittau, in Russia, where he died of a fever contracted while attending French prisoners in 1807. Louis XVIII wrote his epitaph, a copy of which, together with a letter of condolence, was sent by Louis' orders to Mr Ussher Edgeworth in Ireland.

== Memoirs and letters ==
Edgeworth's Mémoires, edited by C. S. Edgeworth, were first published in English (London, 1815), and a French translation (really the letters and some miscellaneous notes, etc.) was published in Paris in 1816. A translation of the Lettres de l'abbé Edgeworth avec des mémoires sur sa vie was published by Madame Elizabeth de Bow in Paris in 1818, and Letters from the Abbé Edgeworth to his Friends, with Memoirs of his Life, edited by Thomas Richard England, in London in 1818.
