= John England & the Western Swingers =

American swing band

- Origin: Nashville, Tennessee
- Genre: Western swing
- Members: John England, Gene "Pappy" Merritts, Tommy Hannum, David Spicher, Walter Hartman, Neil Stretcher
- Past members: Randy Mason, Tom McBryde
- Website: http://www.westernswingers.com/

John England & the Western Swingers is a six piece Nashville, Tennessee band that plays Western swing. The group has performed at Robert's Western World on Broadway, Nashville's famous music strip, every Monday night since July 2001. The Swingers also have been featured at New York's Lincoln Center, the Grand Ole Opry, the Legends of Western Swing Festival and Ernest Tubb Record Shop's "Midnight Jamboree." Profiled by Downbeat Magazine, The Tennessean (newspaper), and other print media, the band remains one of Nashville's most beloved and popular purveyors of traditional live Western swing music.

== Members ==
The band's lineup is: John England (gtr, vocals) Gene "Pappy" Merritts (fiddle, vocals) Tommy Hannum(steel, vocals) David Spicher(bass, vocals) Walter Hartman (drums) Neil Stretcher (piano, vocals)

Earlier members of the group include Randy Mason (drums & vocals, 2002–2004) and Tom McBryde (piano, 2002–2005)

== Discography ==
The group's 4 albums are: Swinging Broadway (2002), Thanks a Lot (2004), Open that Gate (2008), and Songs Older than Pappy (2013). Swinging Broadway established the group's stylistic identity, i.e. Bob Wills type Western Swing with ensembles of guitar, fiddle and steel. Thanks a Lot contains Western Swing versions of songs popularized by Ernest Tubb. Open that Gate emphasizes the group's original songs. Songs Older than Pappy is a collection of Americana standards & some originals.
