= Howard S. England =

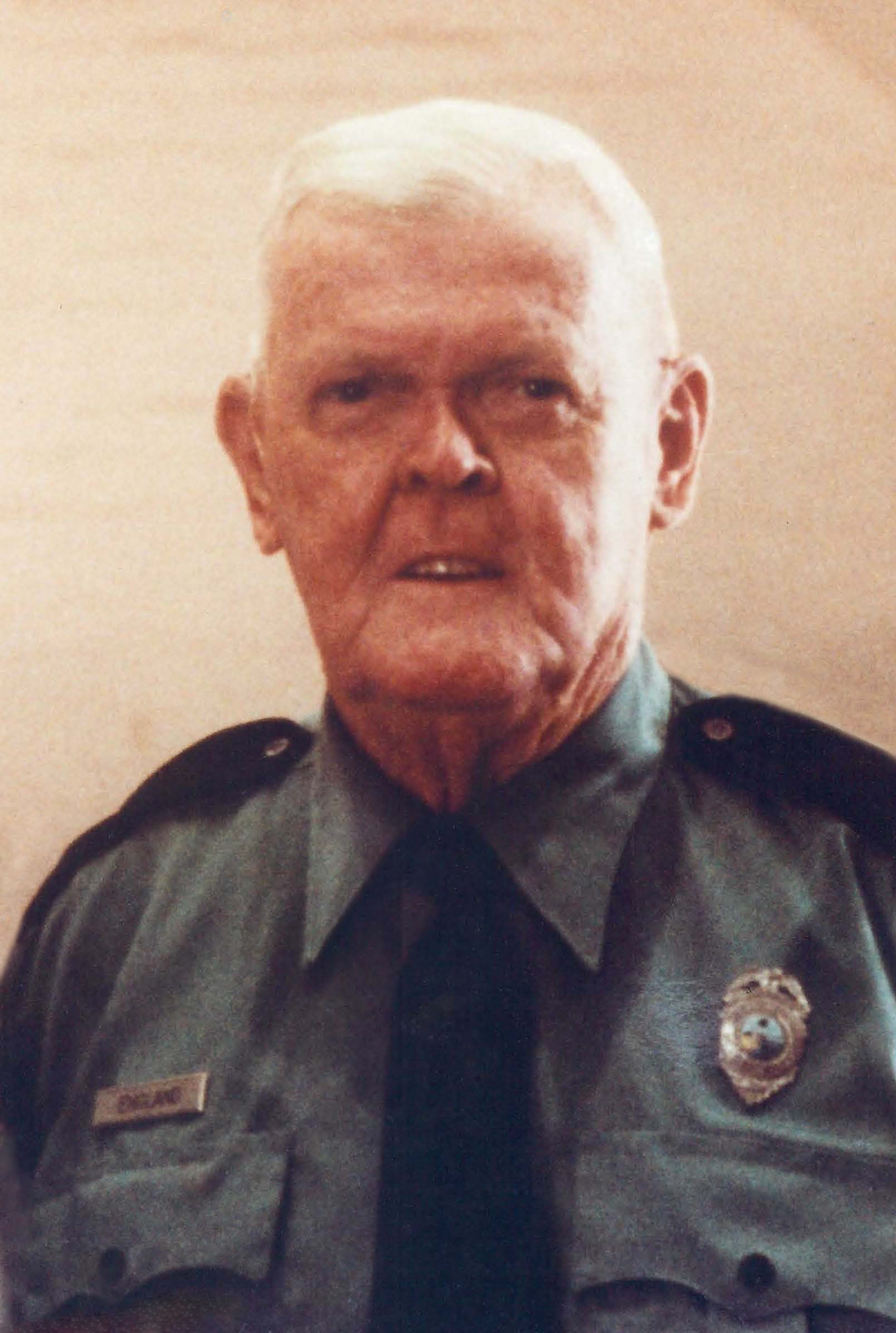
Ranger Howard England on his Retirement Day in 1984

Howard S. England (August 18, 1914 – February 18, 1999), was the principal individual responsible for the transformation of Fort Zachary Taylor from a forgotten eyesore to a popular historic landmark and state park in Key West, Florida.

England, a civilian architect/engineer for the Navy in 1968, was born in Key West, Florida. He served in the United States Marine Corps as a Combat Photographer with the Sixth Marine Division on Guadalcanal and Okinawa. After World War II he returned to Key West eventually joining the Navy's Public Works Department as an architect and Base Historian.

Fort Zachary Taylor was one of over 40 fortifications built by the U.S. Army Corps of Engineers between 1830 and 1866 to guard strategic harbors along the eastern and western coasts of the United States. Construction on Fort Taylor began in 1845 and was completed in 1866. The Fort served as a silent sentinel during the Civil War protecting the harbor at Key West. Fort Zachary Taylor remained Army property until after World War II, when it was turned over to the Navy to be used eventually as a salvage or junk yard. In 1968, England, along with several others was tasked by the Naval Station Commander to investigate the site for possible historic significance. After they found indications that there might be Civil War armaments buried within the Fort, England asked the Navy for permission to further explore the site on a volunteer, after-hours basis. Although the Navy couldn't afford to fund his efforts, the Base Commander approved his proposal. From 1968 to 1973, England spent many hours with his volunteers, whom he called "sandhogs", digging at the Fort. Because of his discoveries during his time at the Fort, he became recognized as an expert in Civil War Coastal Artillery, called “The Sherlock Holmes of Fort Taylor” by a reporter in 1984.

In 1973, England retired from Civil Service with the Navy. This allowed him to devote even more time to exploring and recovering cannons and artifacts until the fall of 1976. England "uncovered the largest collection of Civil War armaments in the United States, including cannon, guns, a desalinization plant and thousands of cannon balls and projectiles.". After the historic significance of the Fort was established, the Navy transferred the property to the Department of the Interior in 1975, which subsequently deeded it to the State of Florida in 1976 to be developed as a State Park. Prior to his transfer to the Florida Park Service, Howard England, in collaboration with Ida Barron, wrote and published the first-ever book on the history and re-discovery of Fort Taylor. He titled it: Fort Zachary Taylor: A Sleeping Giant Awakens. It went out of print in 1995. In 2013, his son Edward L. England published a brand new second edition of his father's book. When it sold out in 2015, he updated the second edition and expanded it significantly.

Howard England continued his work on the Fort as a temporary employee with the Florida Park Service from October 1976 until October 1978 when he was chosen as the first permanent Park Ranger for the new Park. With further digging and exploration curtailed by the Park Service, England turned his attention to planning for the new Park. He also documented his findings in a series of detailed engineering drawings from which he built some 20 scale models of the principle guns and other features of the Fort as it existed at the end of the Civil War and later when it was modified during the Endicott Period from 1898 – 1906. These models and a large number of artifacts and photographs became the contents of what was later called “The Howard England Museum of Coastal Artillery.” He also restored two very important field artillery pieces – a Model 1905 3-inch Field Howitzer and a Model 1905 Colt Gatling Gun. In 1983, England was recognized by the Director of the Park Service as the first-ever recipient of the Florida Park Service's Distinguished Service Award. He continued as a Park Ranger until August 1984 when he retired at age 70.

England continued his research after retirement and discovered how the armaments came to be buried and wrote his memoirs of his work at the Fort. These were published in 2014 as Digging into History: One Man's Journey of Discovery. England donated a total of 84 of his Architectural and technical drawings of Fort Zachary Taylor 1969-1980 to the Bureau of Archaeological Research, who transferred them to the State Library and Archives of Florida, where they reside today. The balance of his drawings is held at the Bureau of Natural & Cultural Resources’ Collections Facility in Tallahassee. All of Howard England's drawings are available in digital format as .tif or .jpeg files at Fort Zachary Taylor Historic State Park.

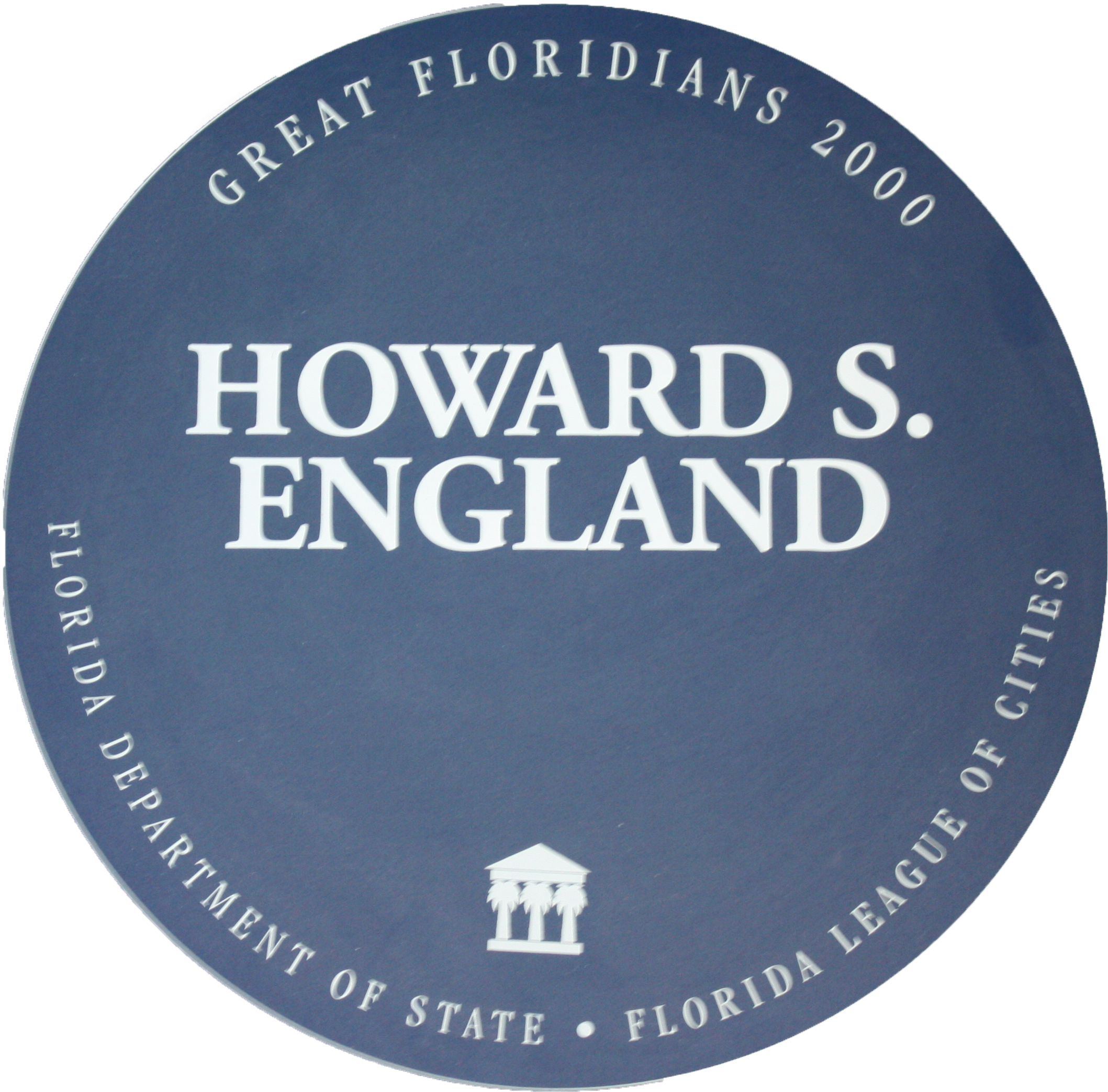
Howard England's Great Floridian 2000 Plaque

In 1971, Fort Zachary Taylor was placed on the National Register of Historic Places, designated a National Historic Landmark in 1973 and in 1985, became Fort Zachary Taylor Historic State Park. When he was laying out the Park in the early 1980s, Howard England noted that the southernmost point of the landfill the Corps of Engineers placed around the Fort in 1965 had been eroded into a nice sand beach. Consequently, he incorporated this into his plan and made sure that the park would have the best beach in Key West. Thousands of visitors enjoy the beach and the Fort each year.

Howard England died in 1999. The following year he was recognized by the Florida Department of State and Florida League of Cities as a Great Floridian. The Great Floridians 2000 program was designed to recognize individuals who distinguished themselves through their philanthropy, public service or personal or professional service, and who have enhanced the lives of Florida's citizens. His Great Floridian 2000 plaque is located in the Park Manager's Office at Fort Zachary Taylor Historic State Park in Key West.
