= England captain =

England captain and similar terms normally refer to the head player in a sports team that represents England.

Lists of England captains include:

- List of England cricket captains
- List of England national football team captains

For captains in other sports, see the corresponding articles on those sports.
