= Thomas Richard England =

Irish biographer

- Born: 1790
- Died: 1847 (aged 56–57)
- Occupations: Priest; non-fiction writer

Thomas Richard England (1790–1847), was an Irish priest and biographer.

== Life ==
England was the younger brother of John England, bishop of Charleston. He was born at Cork in 1790, and after taking holy orders in the Roman Catholic Church was appointed curate of the church of St. Peter and St. Paul in his native city. He became parish priest of Glanmire, and afterwards of Passage West, County Cork, where he died on 18 March 1847.

== Works ==
He published:

- 'Letters from the Abbé Edgeworth to his Friends, with Memoirs of his Life, including some account of the late Roman Catholic Bishop of Cork, Dr. Moylan, and letters to him from the Right Hon. Edmund Burke and other persons of distinction,’ London. 1818, 8vo.
- 'A Short Memoir of an Antique Medal, bearing on one side the representation of the head of Christ and on the other a curious Hebrew inscription, lately found at Friar's Walk, near the city of Cork,’ London. 1819, 8vo. 3. 'The Life of the Rev. Arthur O'Leary, including historical anecdotes, memoirs, and many hitherto unpublished documents illustrative of the condition of the Irish Catholics during the eighteenth century,’ London. 1822, 8vo.
