= George England (divine) =

George England (fl. 1735), was an English divine and author. England was a member of the England family which flourished at Yarmouth, Norfolk, in the 16th and 17th centuries, and may have been a grandson of Sir George England.

== Career ==
He was chaplain to Lord Hobart, by whom he was presented in 1733 to the living of Hanworth, Norfolk. In 1737 he resigned Hanworth to become rector of Wolterton and Wickmere, a consolidated living in the same county.

== Writings ==
He was the author of ‘An Enquiry into the Morals of the Ancients,’ London, 1737, 4to, a work based on the belief that the ‘ancients,’ by whom is understood the Greeks and Romans, were much superior in the practice of morality to Christians in general.
