= Gordon England =

Gordon England may refer to:

- Gordon R. England (born 1937), American industrialist and government official
- Gordon England (coachbuilder), a British coachbuilding company
- Eric Gordon England (1891–1976), British pioneer aviator
