= Arthur England =

Arthur England may refer to:

- Arthur England (clergyman) (1872–1946), Anglican clergyman
- Arthur J. England Jr. (1932–2013), American jurist and lawyer

== See also ==
- Arthur English (1919–1995), English actor and comedian
- Arthur B. English (1869–1938), Canadian executioner
- Arthur Inglis (fl. 1960s), New Zealand former footballer
