= John Humphrey England =

- John Humphrey England c. 1870
- Born: 7 November 1817; Islington, London, England
- Died: 27 August 1887 (aged 69); Eastbrook Hall, Cathays, Glamorgan, Wales
- Occupations: Founder & director of England Potatoes Ltd.
- Spouse: Ann Rees (m. 1841)
- Children: 16, including Edward and Thomas

John Humphrey England (7 November 1817 – 27 August 1887) was a British merchant, businessman and entrepreneur, known for founding England Potatoes Ltd.; a successful potato importing business in Victorian Wales.

== Early life ==
John Humphrey England was born in Islington, London, on 7 November 1817, the second of seven children. His father was John Humphrey England (18 August 1792 – 1854), a shoemaker from Limehouse. His mother was Mary Gray Lilly (1791–1840), who was baptised in Britford, Wiltshire, England on 18 September 1791, daughter of William Lilly of Northumberland (5 April 1756 – 1825) and Sarah Eglon (c. 1761 – c. 1794). England received a private education in which he was trained to have a commercial career in business. England moved to Cardiff in 1840. His obituary explained that he decided to move to Cardiff as it was a town "which gave the most opportunities for the exercise of his undoubted business faculties."

== Marriage and family ==
England married Ann Rees (1821 – 25 September 1892), a daughter of "Mr Thomas Rees, late of Her Majesty's Customs", in Cardiff, in 1841. They would have a large family of 16 children, two of which England outlived:

- William Lilly England (1842–11 July 1930) emigrated in 1863 per ship "Annie Wilson" to New Zealand, where he married Clara Hill at Campbelltown (now Rongotea) in the Manawatu on 6 July 1872. They had 9 children together, one of whom died in infancy. William died in Auckland, New Zealand, on 11 June 1930, aged 88.
- Margaret England (1844–1907) spinster.
- John Humphrey England (1846–24 March 1928) bachelor. Followed his father into the Potato merchant trade.
- Thomas England (1847–1927) married Isabella Helena Budge on 29 September 1867 and had 10 children, 9 boys and 1 girl. Worked as a commercial traveller for the family business. His daughter was named Isabella Helena England and married Henry Thomas Hawkins.
- Mary Gray England (1850–14 April 1907) married George Thomas, an architect, in 1874 and had 5 children.
- Ann England (7 December 1851 – 1852) died in infancy.
- Anne England (1852 – 10 December 1876) died aged 24 after a "long and painful illness."
- Richard England (1854–1907) married Mary Jemima Travell in 1880 and had 5 children. Worked as a potato merchant.
- James England (1856 – 29 December 1947) married Margaret Constance Lingen in 1895 and had 1 child. Worked as a potato merchant
- Elizabeth England (1857 – 1 August 1922) married Cpt. Thomas Hesketh, a marine surveyor and shipbroker, on 4 June 1887 and had 7 children.
- Edward England (1859 – 30 August 1917) married Louisa Mary Lewis on 23 August 1887 and had 6 children. Worked as a potato merchant, and succeeded his father as head of the business.
- Fanny England (1861 – 2 July 1937) married Herbert Lewis, a manufacturer of Indian rubber, in 1888.
- Caroline England (1863–1919) married David Harries, a pharmacist, in 1908.
- Charles Douglas England (1865–1935) married Elizabeth Annie Carpenter in 1892 and had 7 children. Worked as a "wine and spirits commercial traveller.""
- Robert Rees England (1867 – 21 February 1952) married Jessie Morris on 4 July 1894. Worked as a potato merchant.
- Jessie England (21 July 1868 – 10 February 1954) married Nicholas Herbert Cory, a coal merchant, in 1908.

== Career ==
England and his wife moved into the house 1 Nelson Terrace, in Cardiff, soon after they married. England founded his potato business the following year, in 1842. His obituary describes his initial focus to be "supplying the stores in the hamlets that dotted the valleys between Cardiff and Merthyr Tydfil." In the first few years of the business, it was not particularly successful, and so was initially secondary to England's additional career as a hay dealer. Despite this, England's business was immediately well known for being the first to import potatoes from Germany. The scale of England's business grew parallel to the population. The completion of the Taff Vale Railway "increased facilities for transport of merchandise", which rapidly developed the business further. In 1852, England secured some large warehouses, that had been extended, in St Mary Street. England moved from Nelson Terrace to a house in St Mary Street, where he remained for the next 25 years. England also used various warehouses in connection with the West Bute Dock. In the early 1870s, England began dealing corn as well as potatoes. In the late 1870s, England retired and built Eastbrooke Hall, in Dinas Powys, where he lived "in quiet seclusion" for the rest of his life.

In June 1872, England bought The White Lion Inn, in Roath, from Mr. Joseph Trott. England converted the Inn into a hotel, then sold it on to Mr. Stephen Lacey in September 1872. In his obituary, England was also described as a "large landowner" in Cadoxton and Dinas Powys, and also had "considerable house property" in Cardiff.

England was described as "extremely philanthropic", who frequently donated to his local community and to other charities – particularly around the Christian holidays such as Christmas or Easter. In the Christmas season of 1878, England donated "two large boxes of oranges" from his orange business to the poor. Similarly, during Christmas 1883, a charity feast was held at the Cardiff workhouse and England was listed as among the benefactors who contributed to the feast. England's philanthropy made him a popular and respected figure in Cardiff.

England was known to be an "unobtrusive man" who did not like being the center of attention or attracting attention to himself. As a result, he did not involve himself in politics or local affairs, except for on a small number of occasions. However England was a very popular figure, and was "several times" pressed to enter the Cardiff City Council. After his retirement to Dinas Powys, England became somewhat of an "unofficial leader" of the community. His obituary described how "he was naturally a central figure, and he was regarded with great affection by the inhabitants of the little village." England's frequent donations to various projects around Dinas Powys to help the village was likely a main source of his popularity.

== Death ==
In his later years England was prone to "faintness and bleeding of the nose when excited", but remained in good health generally. At about 6:00 on the morning of 27 August 1887, England's wife was woken up by him having a violent coughing fit. She sent for a doctor, but by the time he arrived England had died. England was given a lengthy obituary in South Wales Daily News. An inquest was held into the cause of his death on 29 August by deputy-coroner Mr H. L. Grover. After reviewing evidence, it was decided that England had been suffering from late-stage heart disease. England was buried in Cathays Cemetery in a private funeral on 31 August 1887. The ceremony was conducted by Rev Canon Powell Edwards, and funeral arrangements carried out by Andrews and Son undertakers. His probate was executed by his sons Edward and James in Llandaff, on 9 December 1887. He left a personal estate of £3161 4s. 6d.

== Legacy ==
England was succeeded by his sixth son, Edward England. Edward re-branded the company it as "Edward England Potato Importers ltd." Under Edward, more family members would join the enterprise, whilst a firm was set up which also supplied potatoes grown in the Netherlands, Poland and Brittany. England's fourth son, James, and his family, moved into Eastbrook Hall after England's death. His wife, Ann, died five years later at the age of 70.
