= Robert England =

Robert England may refer to:

- Robert E. England, professor of political science at Oklahoma State University
- Robert England (architect) (1863–1908), New Zealand architect
