= Benjamin England =

English politician (1647–1711)

Member of Parliament for Great Yarmouth
- In office 1702–1709

Personal details
- Born: 1647
- Died: 1711 (aged 63–64)

Benjamin England (1647–1711) was an English politician who was a member of parliament for Great Yarmouth in Norfolk from 1702 to 1709.
