= Richard England =

Richard England may refer to:

- Richard England (architect) (born 1937), Maltese architect, writer, artist and academic
- Richard England (cyclist) (born 1981), Australian racing cyclist
- Richard G. England (1750–1812), British Army officer and Lieutenant-Governor of Plymouth
  - Sir Richard England (British Army officer, born 1793) (1793–1883), British Army general, his son

== See also ==
- King Richard (disambiguation)
