= Eric England =

Eric England may refer to:

- Eric England (director) (born 1988), American film director, writer, and producer
- Eric England (gridiron football) (born 1971), American former gridiron football defensive end
- Eric England (sniper) (1933–2018), United States sniper during the Vietnam War
- Eric Gordon England (1891–1976), British aviator, racing driver, and engineer
