= Justice England =

Justice England may refer to:

- Arthur J. England Jr. (1932–2013), associate justice and chief justice of the Florida Supreme Court
- John H. England (born 1947), associate justice of the Supreme Court of Alabama

== See also ==
- Justice English (disambiguation)
