= Edward England (potato importer) =

- Born: December 1859; Charles Street, Cardiff, Wales
- Died: 30 August 1917 (aged 56); Parc, Llanishen, Cardiff, Wales
- Occupation: Director of England Potatoes Ltd.
- Spouse: Louise Mary England (née Lewis) (1865–1944)
- Children: Captain John Humphrey England; Arthur England; Kathleen Mary England; Doris Louise England; Edward England; Harry Smith England

Edward England (December 1859 – 30 August 1917) was a Welsh businessman, entrepreneur and merchant, who was the director of Edward England Potato Importers Ltd from 1887, until his sudden death three decades later.

== Early life ==
Edward England was born in 1859, around December, in Cardiff. He was the 8th child, and 6th son, of English-born John Humphrey England, a potato merchant, and Ann Rees. England's maternal grandparents, Thomas and Margaret Rees, were both farmers from Lisvane. Edward had a privileged upbringing - his father was the founder of a successful potato importing company, and so the family were able to afford a large house and several servants.

== Marriage and issue ==
Edward married Louise Mary Lewis in July 1887 - one month before the death of his father. They had six children, three of which survived to adulthood:

- Captain John Humphrey England (1888–1976) married Lilian Elizabeth Noyes and had 3 children:
  - Elizabeth Joan England (1917–2010) married Colonel Dudley Thornton and had 3 children.
  - Rosalind England (1919–2013) married Robert Norris and had 3 children.
  - Audrey Lilian England (1920–2020) married John Rowland Payne and had 3 children.
- Arthur England (1890–1890) died in infancy.
- Kathleen Mary England (1893–1971) spinster.
- Doris Louise England (1894–1979) married Lt Comdr Adrian Henry James Stokes, son of Sir Gabriel Stokes, and had 2 children:
  - Pamela Mary Stokes (1918–2011) married Brigadier Vincent Alexander Prideaux Budge and had 3 children.
  - Terence Edward Gabriel Stokes (1921–2000) married Eve Slezenger and had 1 child.
- Edward England (1900–1901) died in infancy.
- Harry Smith England (1900–1901) died in infancy.

== Career ==
Edward joined the family business, alongside his father and older brothers, as soon as he finished school. He succeeded his father as owner of the business in 1887, and rebranded it as "Edward England Potato Importers Ltd", more commonly known simply as "Edward England." Under Edward's leadership, the company began importing potatoes from Holland, Poland and Brittany. Importing the potatoes from Brittany became so prestigious, that the company was able to acquire its own steam ship, the SS Cardiff City, in 1909. Despite the decimation of the countryside during the First World War, the company continued to flourish. After the end of hostilities, and prompted by a disease outbreak in Northern France, it began to encourage the growing of early potatoes on the Southern Irish coast.

=== Freemasons ===
Edward became part of the Freemasons in 1897, signing up to the United Grand Lodge of England on 4 March.

== Death ==
England died, suddenly, on 30 August 1917 – 3 days after the 30th anniversary of his father's death - at his home in Llanishen. He was succeeded by his son, John Humphrey "Jack" England.
