= Sandhurst England =

Australian cricketer and businessman (1856–1903)

Personal information
- Full name: Sandhurst Pearce England
- Born: 4 June 1856; Sandhurst, Victoria, Australia
- Died: 20 April 1903 (aged 46); Port Phillip, Victoria, Australia
- Role: Batsman

Domestic team information
- Years: Team
- 1879/80: Wellington

Career statistics
Competition	First-class
Matches	2
Runs scored	37
Batting average	12.33
100s/50s	0/0
Top score	29
Catches/stumpings	0/–
- Source: Cricinfo, 21 October 2020

Sandhurst Pearce England (4 June 1856 – 20 April 1903) was an Australian cricketer who played two matches of first-class cricket for Wellington in New Zealand in 1879.

== Life and career ==
England was born in 1856 in the Victorian goldfields town of Bendigo, when it was still called Sandhurst. He was the fourth of six children of Elizabeth (née Pearce) and Alfred England, a lawyer, who had arrived in Sandhurst from England in 1852.

In late 1879, England was working as a teller for the Bank of New Zealand in Wellington when he was selected to play for the provincial cricket team. In his second match for Wellington, an extremely low-scoring match in which 210 runs were scored for the loss of 40 wickets, England opened the innings and was the top scorer in the match on either side, with 29 in Wellington's first innings total of 51. He was ninth out and was praised for his "exceedingly fine play".

England married Matilda Zander in Melbourne in April 1886, and a daughter was born to them in April 1887. They lived in Flower Street, in the suburb of Essendon. The Zander family gave them one of their warehouses in King Street in the centre of Melbourne. In 1889 he was awarded a Certificate of Merit by the Royal Humane Society of Australasia for rescuing a three-year-old boy from drowning in a flooded quarry.

Matilda died in April 1890. England died suddenly of a heart attack aboard the SS Pilbarra in April 1903, just after the ship entered Port Phillip as he was returning from a business trip to Sydney. In his will he left his estate of more than £12,000 in trust to his daughter.
