= Peter Cross (rugby union) =

English rugby union supporter

Peter Cross (also known as Mr. England) is an English rugby union supporter from Dawlish, Devon, who follows the England national rugby union team.

== Personal life ==
Cross is married and lives in Dawlish. Cross previously worked in tourism and owned a number of souvenir shops in Devon. He had also made business deals with other shops in the United Kingdom before retiring to work on a part-time basis.

== Rugby history ==
Cross had previously played rugby for Teignmouth R.F.C. and Torquay RFC. In 1996, Cross attended the Olympics in Atlanta, United States while wearing a Union Flag costume; he received a measure of publicity for it. Later in the year, he wore the costume to an England match at Twickenham Stadium in London. Two years later, he changed the costume to be based on the Flag of England as he felt that the Union Flag was not right for use at Twickenham. The year afterwards, he received a phone call from the Rugby Football Union inviting Cross to become the first official mascot of the England team because they had seen him in his costume. He made his official debut in 2000 against Australia.

In 2006, the RFU commissioned a teddy bear based on Cross to be sold as official England merchandise. 5,000 were produced and they sold out within a season. Cross uses his position to compete in charity fundraisers. In 2007, Cross later acted in a Greene King IPA advert for the RFU.

== Costume ==
When at England matches, Cross wears a top hat with the St. George's Cross on it as well as a white and red tail coat with a red rose and lapel pins on the lapel. Cross also carries a bulldog toy which is placed on the touchline at matches at Twickenham.
