= List of Great Floridians =

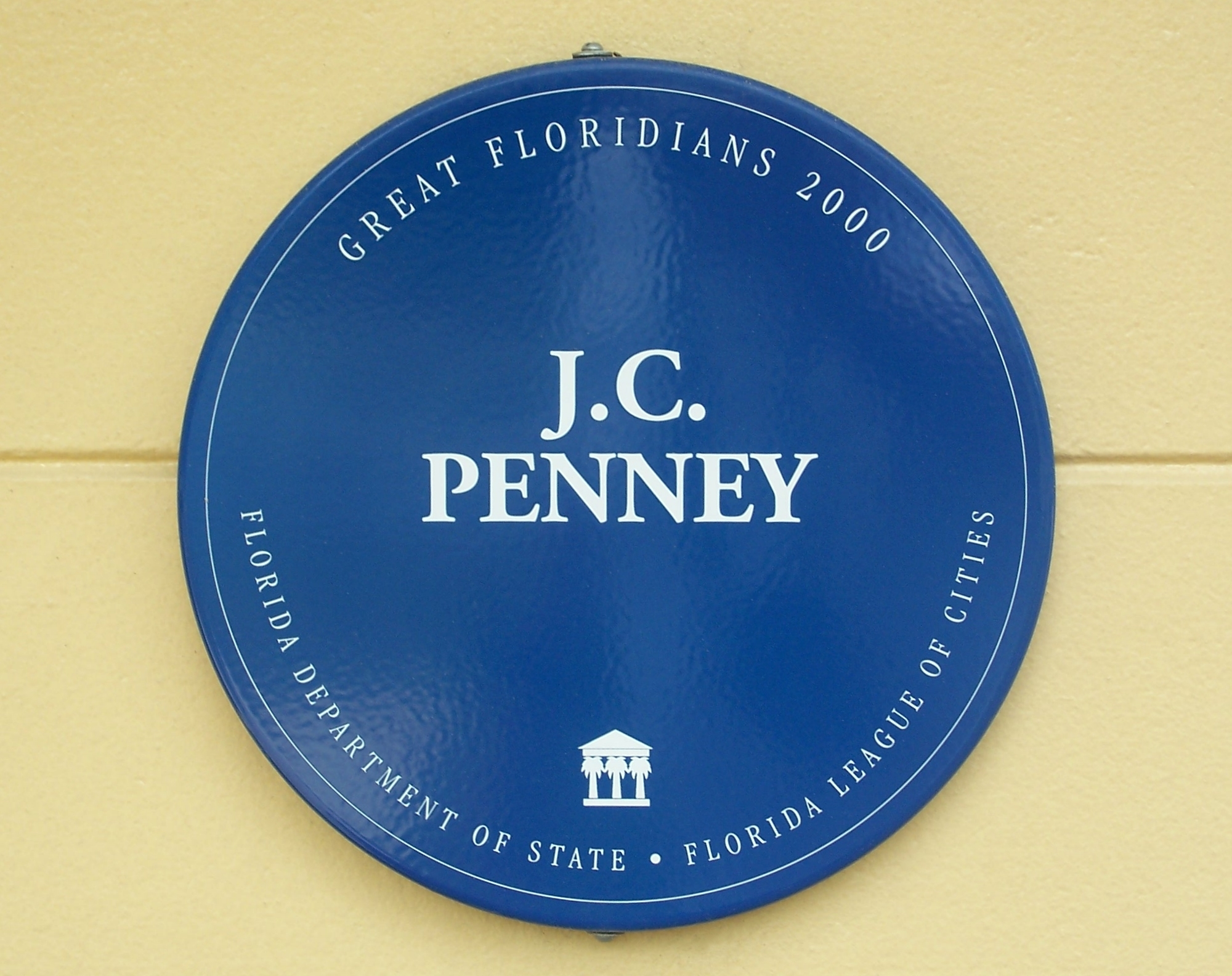
Great Floridian panel for James Cash Penney

Great Floridian is a title bestowed upon notable citizens in the state of Florida by the Florida Department of State. There were two formal programs.

== Great Floridians 2000 ==
The Florida Department of State and the Florida League of Cities created the program in 1998 to help celebrate the approaching end of the millennium. The process dedicated a special series of commemorative panels in cities throughout the state recognizing deceased individuals who made significant contributions to the history and culture of Florida. A total of 385 persons were honored.

== Great Floridians Program ==
In 2007, the legislature resurrected, revised and formalized Great Floridians in Florida law as Florida Statute 267.0731. A defined committee consisting of the top members of the Executive and Legislative branches of government meets each year to nominate citizens for designation. The Florida Secretary of State then selects at least two nominees for the honor. As of 2011, 58 people had been included.

Governor Rick Scott added 22 names in 2013, including former Miami Dolphins Coach Don Shula, former University of Florida Gators football player and coach Steve Spurrier, 2012 Masters golf champion Bubba Watson Jr., former Florida Supreme Court Chief Justice Richard Ervin, and Dr. Pedro Jose Greer Jr., an advocate for homeless and the disadvantaged in Miami, as well as Betty Sembler of St. Petersburg, who championed drug treatment efforts, former Tampa Bay Buccaneers coach Tony Dungy, General Norman Schwarzkopf, who led U.S. forces in Iraq, former state agriculture commissioner Charles Bronson, former state treasurer Bill Gunter, Walt Disney, Patrick D. Smith, agricultural leader Ruth Springer Wedgworth, former Buccaneers linebacker Derrick Brooks, Hall of Fame running back Emmitt Smith, former Florida Supreme Court Justice Alto Adams, Spanish explorer Juan Ponce de León, retired General Craig McKinley, clothing designer Lilly Pulitzer, entrepreneur H. Wayne Huizenga, and James Robert Cade, an American physician, university professor, research scientist, and inventor who led research efforts that developed Gatorade.

=== Great Floridians Program ===
(on-going)

Full Name	Attribute	Year
Bob Graham	Florida Governor and U.S. Senator	2016
Alto Adams	Florida Supreme Court Justice	2013
Derrick Brooks	Outstanding Linebacker for the Florida State University Seminoles and Tampa Bay Buccaneers	2013
Charles Bronson	Florida Agriculture Commissioner (2001-2010)	2013
Robert Cade	Inventor of Gatorade	2013
Walt Disney	Co-founder of Walt Disney World Resort, which changed Florida forever	2013
Tony Dungy	former NFL Player and Coach	2013
Richard W. Ervin Jr.	Florida Attorney General from 1948–64; Florida Supreme Court Justice 1964-75	2013
Pedro José Greer, Jr.	Florida International University School of Medicine chairman; founder, Camillus Health Concern & St. John Bosco Clinic	2013
Bill Gunter	Florida State Senator 1966-72; United States House of Representatives from 1973–75; Florida insurance commissioner, treasurer and fire marshal 1976-88.	2013
Wayne Huizenga	Founder of Waste Management, Blockbuster Video and AutoNation; owner of Florida Marlins and Florida Panthers	2013
Juan Ponce de León	Spanish founder of Florida	1508
Charlotte Maguire	Mother of the FSU Medical School	2013
Craig McKinley	Four-star general	2013
Lilly Pulitzer	Clothing designer	2013
Norman Schwarzkopf, Jr.	Four-star general	2013
Betty Schlesinger Sembler	Drug treatment advocate	2013
Don Shula	Miami Dolphins head coach	2013
Emmitt Smith	University of Florida Gators running back; NFL Hall of Famer	2013
Patrick D. Smith	Novelist	2013
Steve Spurrier	1966 Heisman Trophy winner and former head football coach of the University of Florida Gators	2013
Tim Tebow	Heisman Trophy winner (2007), College & Professional Football player, Motivational speaker, Role model	2013
Gerry Lester "Bubba" Watson, Jr.	PGA golfer	2013
Ruth Springer Wedgworth	Distinguished figure in Florida agriculture	2013
Albert H. Blanding	Business & Civic leader, Army officer awarded the Distinguished Service Medal	2012
Bobby Bowden	Florida State University Seminoles football head coach (1976–2009)	2012
Caroline Mays Brevard	Educator, Historian and Author	2012
Jeb Bush	Florida's 43rd Governor 1999-2007	2012
Bernardo de Gálvez	Spanish military leader who helped drive the British from the Gulf Coast following the American Revolution	2012
James M. Gavin	US Army Lieutenant general during World War II	2012
Frederick B. Karl	Lawyer, State Representative, State Senator, Florida Supreme Court Justice	2012
Thomas Alva Edison	Inventor, Scientist & Businessman	2011
Bob Graham	Florida's 38th Governor 1979-1987 and United States Senator 1987-2005	2011
George W. Jenkins	Founder of Publix Supermarkets	2011
Toni Jennings	Teacher, Florida State Representative, Florida State Senator, Senate President and Lieutenant Governor	2011
Harrison Reed	Florida's 9th Governor 1868-1873	2011
Nathaniel Pryor Reed	Assistant to Governor Kirk 1967-1971, Assistant United States Secretary of the Interior 1971-1977	2011
Marshall E. "Doc" Rinker, Sr.	Founder, Rinker Group	2011
Jim Smith	Lawyer, Florida Attorney General, Florida Secretary of State, Chairman of the Florida State University Trustees	2011
Park Trammell	Florida's 21st Governor 1913-1917 and United States Senator 1917-1936	2011
Sandy D'Alemberte	American Bar Association president & Florida State University president (1994–2003)	2010
Paula Hawkins	Consumer Advocate and US Senator from Florida 1981-1987	2010
Joseph Patrick Hurley	Roman Catholic Archbishop	2010
Tony Jannus	First commercial airline pilot & parachutist	2010
David McCampbell	World War II Ace Navy Pilot	2010
Sarah D. McKay	Lakeland Philanthropist	2010
Eddie Rickenbacker	World War I Ace Pilot & Medal of Honor recipient	2010
Pedro Menendez de Aviles	Spanish Admiral and explorer	2009
Bob Martinez	Florida's 40th Governor 1987-1991	2009
Mae McMillan	Educator and founder of Pine Crest School	2009
Eugene Patterson	Newspaperman & Civil Rights Advocate	2009
Charlie W. Pierce	Early Florida Settler	2009
Marjorie Kinnan Rawlings	Author of The Yearling	2009
E. Clay Shaw, Jr.	US Representative 1981-2007	2008
May Mann Jennings	Women's Rights activist, Environmentalist & children's welfare advocate	2008
Harry T. Moore	Civil rights activist	2007
Connie Mack III	US Senator 1989-2001 & US Representative 1983–1989	2007
Richard Keith Call	Florida's 3rd & 5th Territorial Governor	2006
Julia DeForest Sturtevant Tuttle	"Mother of Miami"	2006
William Pope Duval	Florida's 1st Territorial Governor 1822-1834	2005
Al Hoffman	Philanthropist & Civic Leader	2005
Spessard Holland	Florida's 28th Governor 1941-1945	2004
Fuller Warren	Florida's 30th Governor 1949-1953	2004
Mary Call Darby Collins	Lifelong Preservationist	2003
Henry Morrison Flagler	Industrialist and Developer	2003
Zora Neale Hurston	Writer and Folklorist	2003
Henry Plant	Industrialist and Developer	2003
James Alward Van Fleet	Combat Commander & Four-Star General	2002
Mary McLeod Bethune	Educator and Activist	2002
John Gorrie	Physician, Scientist and Inventor	2002
William Henry Getty (Bill) France	NASCAR Founder and Motor Sports Promoter	2002
Richard (Dick) Pope	Cypress Gardens Founder & Tourism Promoter	2002
Mallory E. Horne	Florida House Speaker and Senate President	2002
Horacio Aguirre	Publisher, Journalist & Editor of Diario Las Americas	2001
Lawton M. Chiles	Florida's 41st Governor 1991-1998 & US Senator 1971-1989	2001
Reubin O'D. Askew	Florida's 37th Governor 1971-1979	1998
William Patrick Foster	Bandleader, Florida A&M "Marching 100"	1998
Chesterfield Smith	Justice Advocate & Florida's First American Bar Association President	1997
E. T. York	Florida University System Chancellor & IFAS Founder	1997
Cecil Farris Bryant	Florida's 34th Governor 1961-1965	1994
George A. Smathers	US Senator 1951-1969	1994
Stephen C. O'Connell	Florida Supreme Court Justice 1966-1967 & UF President 1967-1973	1993
B. K. Roberts	Three-Time Chief Justice of the Florida Supreme Court	1990
Chester Howell Ferguson	Attorney, Business & Civic Leader	1988
Claude Denson Pepper	US Senator 1936-1951 & US Representative 1963-1989	1988
Ben Hill Griffin, Jr.	Citrus Baron, Civic Leader & Benefactor	1987
Marjory Stoneman Douglas	Writer and Environmental Activist	1987
Alonzo "Jake" Gaither	Head Football Coach, Florida A&M University	1984
Thomas LeRoy Collins	Florida's 33rd Governor 1955-1961	1981

=== Great Floridians 2000 (program ended in 2000) ===
Full Name	Attribute	Sponsoring City	Plaque Location
Alvan Wentworth Chapman	Physician and Botanist; author of Flora of the Southern United States	Apalachicola	
John Gorrie	Physician, Scientist and Inventor	Apalachicola	
Mahulda Gussie Brown Carrier	Teacher, first Black Principal in Florida, Rosewood massacre survivor	Archer	
William Emory Maddox	founder of Maddox Foundry & Machine Works and photographer/historian	Archer	
Ephriam Mikell Baynard	Landowner, Cattle Rancher, Farmer, Financier, Real Estate Developer	Auburndale	
Albert H. Blanding	Distinguished Soldier, National Guardsman & Civic leader	Bartow	
Lawrence Bernard (L.B.) Brown	Former Slave, Bible Salesman, Furniture maker, Church founder	Bartow	
Lillian Carpenter	Polk County Historical and Genealogical Library founder, Researcher & Civic leader, Historian & Librarian	Bartow	
E.W. Codington	Banker, Landowner, Mayor, Ice Plant builder, Home Building & Loan Association founder, Board of Trade organizer	Bartow	
Bruce Barkley Downs, Sr	Florida Department of Transportation Director & Hillsborough director of Public Works	Bartow	
Louise Kelley Frisbie	Newspaper Columnist, Author and local Historian	Bartow	
Roy Trent Gallemore	40-year Navy man, 10 years U.S. Department of Interior in Micronesia, owner of Benjamin Franklin Holland House	Bartow	
George Gause	Mortician, First Black City Commissioner, Mayor, School Board member	Bartow	
Samuel Sharpless Green	Public library volunteer & supporter	Bartow	
Jeremiah M. Hayman	Baptist Minister & Missionary; Polk County Clerk of Court	Bartow	
Spessard Holland	Florida's 28th Governor 1941-1945	Bartow	
Evander McIvor Law	Author, Teacher, and Confederate general in the Civil War	Bartow	
E. Louise Marquis	Assistant to five city managers of over more than 40 years while earning Bachelors, Masters and Juris Doctor degrees	Bartow	
Mary Stewart McLeod	established & funded bible study program in Bartow schools for almost 50 years	Bartow	
William Franklin Peacock	physician & surgeon, hospital chief of staff and civic leader	Bartow	
George E. Pittas	restaurateur for 40 years, youth baseball president & national director and civic leader	Bartow	
Edward Crosland Stuart	phosphate land owner, bank director and church founder	Bartow	
Jacob Summerlin	King of the Crackers, Cattle Baron; wealthiest man in Florida prior to Civil War	Bartow	
James Alward Van Fleet	Combat Commander & Four-Star General	Bartow	
Charles Cooper Wilson	lawyer, Florida Constitution framer, prosecuting attorney and state senator	Bartow	
Thomas F Fleming Jr	bank founder, campaigned for bond issue for higher education and establishment of Florida Atlantic University	Boca Raton	
Charles W. Pierce	Barefoot Mailman, hunting/fishing guide & explorer of SE FL interior; postmaster	Boynton Beach	
Bernard Preston Thomas	Artist and painter of Western scenes	Boynton Beach	
Beulah Rebecca Hooks Hannah Tingley	Democratic National Committee member, Florida Democratic Party chairperson, Bradenton Beach Library benefactor	Boynton Beach	
Eldridge F. McLane	Educator, Administrator and Teaching advocate	Brandon	
John Law Ayers	Rancher, Citrus & Timber grower; county commission chairman, state representative, chairman of Livestock Commission & Citrus Commission; district supervisor for Soil Conservation District; bank director	Brooksville	
James E. "Nick" Connor	City & County Clerk, State Senator, County Judge; obtained land & funding for local government, health & education	Brooksville	
Lena Culver Hawkins	first woman mayor and woman's club president	Brooksville	
May Mann Jennings	Women's Rights activist, Environmentalist & advocate for the welfare of children	Brooksville	
William Sherman Jennings	Florida's 18th Governor 1901-1905	Brooksville	
Frank Elmore Saxon	Civil war veteran, tax assessor, postmaster, police chief, clerk of the court and state representative	Brooksville	
St. Clair Whitman	musician, inventor, artifact collector and historian	Cedar Key	
Solomon Smith (S.S.) Coachman	Citrus grower & sawmill operator, mercantile business & packing house, first county commission chairman, helped Pinellas County form from Hillsborough county	Clearwater	
Marie Ringo Holderman	Cocoa Tribune founder and publisher for 50 years	Cocoa	Catherine Schweinsberg Rood Central Library, Cocoa
Gus Callaway Edwards	lawyer, city attorney, mayor and founder of first community church	Cocoa Beach	
A. Philip Randolph	organized and was first President of the International Brotherhood of Sleeping Car Porters, organized 2 marches on Washington, first Black International Vice President of the AFL-CIO	Crescent City	
Marjorie Kinnan Rawlings	Pulitzer Prize winning Author for fiction in 1939, The Yearling	Cross Creek	
Ripley Bullen	Archaeologist	Crystal River	
Francis L. Dade	Military Major in Florida Territory	Dade City	
William M. Larkin	Lawyer, prosecutor, cattleman	Dade City	
Frank "Tootie" Adler	city commissioner, mayor, county commissioner and city attorney	Dania Beach	
Mary McLeod Bethune	co-founder of Bethune-Cookman College, director of federal Office of Minority Affairs, VP of NAACP	Daytona Beach	
Charles Grover Burgoyne	wealthy NY printer, philanthropist	Daytona Beach	
Matthias Day, Jr.	founder of Daytona Beach	Daytona Beach	
George W. Engram, Sr.	electrical engineer, founder of electric company, general manager of African-American Bethune Beach	Daytona Beach	
William (H.G.) France & Annie B. France	NASCAR founders	Daytona Beach	
Jeanne M. Goddard	co-founder & trustee of Daytona Beach Community College, school board chairman and volunteer extraordinaire	Daytona Beach	
J. Griffen Greene	president of African-American Volusia County Community College, dean of Daytona Beach Junior College	Daytona Beach	
Lorenzo Dow Huston	first mayor of Daytona, justice of the peace, school superintendent & county commissioner	Daytona Beach	
Dr. Richard Vernon Moore Sr.	Civic leader	Daytona Beach	
Jack Roosevelt "Jackie" Robinson	first African-American to integrate modern organized baseball, MVP	Daytona Beach	
David Dunham Rogers	co-founder and first surveyor of Daytona, built the first ice plant and first bridge across the Halifax River	Daytona Beach	
Dr. Josie Rogers	first female doctor, chairman of Florida State Health Department, commissioner & only female mayor	Daytona Beach	
Chapman Shaw Root	largest independent Coca-Cola bottler, artifact collector and philanthropist	Daytona Beach	
Dr. Joseph Taylor	Professor of History, chairman of the Daytona Beach Historic Preservation Board	Daytona Beach	
Dr. Howard W. Thurman	author and college dean at Morehouse College, Howard University & Boston University	Daytona Beach	
Frederick deBary	Wine merchant who built DeBary Hall, hunting & fishing estate on the St. Johns River; planted 10,000 citrus trees on 4,000 acres (16 km^{2}); his steamships transported fruit and travellers north to Jacksonville	DeBary	
George Emory Butler	Mayor, Judge, helped establish "Deerfield Locks" for transport via Lake Okeechobee to the Atlantic; helped found Irrigation Association co-op and owned Butler Packing House	Deerfield Beach	
James Dallas Butler	Mercantile store owner, then Butler Brothers Farms owner; children's program supporter	Deerfield Beach	
Emily Mildred Olson Dietrich	Teacher, library supporter and historic preservationist	Deerfield Beach	
Branhilda Knowles	Midwife and advocate for Migrant workers	Deerfield Beach	
Odas Lee Tanner	Construction company owner, city commissioner, vice mayor, expanded parks and implemented beach renourishment	Deerfield Beach	
John Bartow Wiles, Jr.	city commissioner who promoted irrigation control, road building & improvement, medical services, historical society founding member	Deerfield Beach	
Earl W. Brown	Hotel operator, citrus producer & cattle rancher; city manager & mayor; Stephen Foster Memorial Commission chairman & Florida State Chamber of Commerce president	DeLand	
Charles H. Campbell, Jr.	Mayor, fire chief, Rotary Club and auto racing supporter	DeLand	
Hawtense Conrad	Philanthropist and museum founder	DeLand	
Robert Conrad	Philanthropist	DeLand	
Dr. George Augustus Davis	City and county health officer, physician for the Florida East Coast and Atlantic Coast Line Railways, chamber of commerce president	DeLand	
Henry Addison DeLand	founded DeLand, Florida; established DeLand Academy which became Stetson University, founded Lake Helen	DeLand	
Bert Fish	lawyer, school superintendent, county solicitor, judge; US diplomat to Egypt, Saudi Arabia & Portugal	DeLand	
Arthur George Hamlin	Prominent attorney, represented Henry Flagler, citrus grower who developed the Hamlin Orange	DeLand	
Lue Gim Gong	AKA "The Citrus Wizard", created sweet & frost resistant variety of Valencia orange	DeLand	
John B. Stetson	Hatmaker, created practical, durable hats for Western settlers & cowboys	DeLand	
William Amory Underhill	Lawyer, public servant, lobbyist and philanthropist	DeLand	
Calhoun Yancey "C.Y." Byrd	Lawyer, City Councilman, City Attorney, County Commissioner and Bar Association President	Delray Beach	
Dr. John Robert Cason, Jr.	Minister who founded the Methodist Children's Home, School Board member and Municipal Judge	Delray Beach	
Marshall DeWitt	farmer, agricultural leader, City Councilman, mayor, member, then Board Chairman of the First National Bank, Delray Beach Historical Society founder	Delray Beach	
Barbara Dodge Smith	Chamber of Commerce president, City Commissioner, supported city's After School Program and Sandoway Nature Center, was president of the Delray Beach Community Child Care Center	Delray Beach	
Solomon David Spady	School teacher and principal for 34 years who inspired children to learn and go to college	Delray Beach	
Myrtle Scharrer Betz	Fisherwoman for 40 years, conservationist, and writer.	Dunedin	
Bronson Cushing Skinner	Developed the first acceptable process to make concentrated Orange Juice	Dunedin	
Martin A. "Marty" Kellner	Councilman, Mayor & Civic leader	Eagle Lake	
Ora Belle Starling	Volunteer & Civic leader	Eagle Lake	
Zora Neale Hurston	Writer and Folklorist	Eatonville	
Dr. John Milton Hawks	Physician, Author, Historian, Teacher, Newspaper Publisher, Army Officer, Orange Grower, first superintendent of Volusia County Schools and founder of Hawks Park—renamed Edgewater	Edgewater	
Cyrus Teed	Originated Hollow Earth theory and founded Koreshan Unity	Estero	
S.T.E. Pinkney	School Administrator & City Commissioner/Mayor	Eustis	
Deaconess Harriet Bedell	Episcopalian missionary to Everglades Indians	Everglades City	
David Graham Copeland	Manager of 40 Barron Collier businesses & County Commissioner	Everglades City	
Gilbert Edward Barkoski	Rancher, imported English cattle to crossbreed Spanish cows; school board member, county commissioner, World War II Ration Board and Drainage Board member; cattlemen's association president	Fellsmere	
Liberty Billings	Civil war veteran, conducted the U.S. Census in Nassau County, president pro-tempore of the state senate	Fernandina Beach	
Emma B. Delaney	first African-American female missionary sent to Africa	Fernandina Beach	
George Rainsford Fairbanks	lawyer, Clerk of the Circuit Court, state Senator, president of Florida Fruit Growers Association and the Florida Fruit Exchange; editor of the Florida Mirror, authored book on Florida history used in schools, founder and president of Florida Historical Society	Fernandina Beach	
Louis G. Hirth	founder and proprietor of Palace Saloon, open since 1901	Fernandina Beach	
Amos Latham	lighthouse keeper at Amelia Island	Fernandina Beach	
Chloe Merrick	opened a Freedmen's School on Amelia Island; married governor Harrison M. Reed	Fernandina Beach	
William Henderson Peck	Principal of Nassau Colored School Number 1 for 50 years; expanded curriculum to a full high school	Fernandina Beach	
Solicito "Mike" Salvador	leader and innovator in the Florida shrimping industry	Fernandina Beach	
Sisters of St. Joseph	Humanitarians who assisted all people through yellow fever epidemics; founded St. Joseph Academy	Fernandina Beach	
Samuel A. Swann	Accountant and assistant secretary and treasurer of the Florida Railroad Company; land agent	Fernandina Beach	
Marcellus Alphonso Williams	Surveyor and land agent	Fernandina Beach	
David Levy Yulee	Lawyer, Florida Statehood leader, US Senator, Plantation owner, Railroad builder	Fernandina Beach	
Evelyn Fortune Bartlett	renovated the Bonnet House and 35-acre (140,000 m^{2}) estate on Fort Lauderdale beach, preserving one of the last mangrove swamps and coastal hammocks on the South Florida coast	Ft. Lauderdale	
Frederic Clay Bartlett	Noted artist and art collector; designed and built the Bonnet House	Ft. Lauderdale	
George W. English, Jr.	after 1926 hurricane, worked with the city to exchange delinquent taxes for land, established a Savings and Loan Association to fund real estate development, established First National Bank, city attorney, drafted the city's first comprehensive plan and helped establish Broward General Hospital	Ft. Lauderdale	
Dr. Von Delany Mizell	second Black physician who helped establish Provident Hospital; staged sit-ins, protests and started the first NAACP chapter in South Florida, boycotted Fort Lauderdale's "Colored School", sued Medical Association for admittance	Ft. Lauderdale	
Estelle Rouse Pinkett	teacher who motivated her students to attend college, founded first "colored" USO, founded an initiative to train teachers	Ft. Lauderdale	
Margaret Blake Roach	Broward County School administrator, Women in Distress Shelter and United Way supporter, president of the Broward Urban League, Broward Community College Trustee and civic leader	Ft. Lauderdale	
Dr. James F. Sistrunk	first Black physician who helped establish Provident Hospital and was chief of staff, delivering 5,000 babies	Ft. Lauderdale	
Frank Stranahan and Ivy Stranahan	trading post operator, postmaster, ferryboat owner, real estate developer who donated land for hospital, school, park and woman's club; schoolteacher who convinced Seminoles to move to a reservation, hospital supporter	Ft. Lauderdale	
Leon Watts	Teacher, counselor, civil rights activist, community advocate and Broward Community College Trustee	Ft. Lauderdale	
Nathaniel "Nat" J. Patterson	Lawyer, City Attorney, Mayor, State Representative and civic leader	Fort Meade	
Thomas Alva & Mina Miller Edison	prolific Inventor	Fort Myers	
Henry Ford	Founder of Ford Motor Company & Assembly Lines	Fort Myers	
William Thomas Howard	Instrumental in establishing Florida Gulf Coast University	Fort Myers	
Albert E. "Bean" Backus	Self-taught Painter, Charitable Benefactor	Fort Pierce	
Dr. Clem C. Benton	Physician, Founder of Fort Pierce Memorial Hospital, College Trustee and Civic Leader	Fort Pierce	
Zora Neale Hurston	Writer and Folklorist	Fort Pierce	
Daniel T. McCarty	Florida's 31st Governor 1952-1953	Fort Pierce	
Willie H. Blankston	Civil Rights Advocate	Fort Walton Beach	
John Thomas Brooks	Founder of Fort Walton Beach, Civil War veteran, area "Doctor" & Hotel owner	Fort Walton Beach	
Adam J. Gerlach	Owner of Gulfview Hotel and Catholic Church supporter	Fort Walton Beach	
Liza Jackson	Hotel Proprietor, Women's & Garden Club founder, Donated Land for numerous Civic Projects	Fort Walton Beach	
William C. Lazarus	Pilot, Aeronautics Instructor & Research Engineer, Project Manager of Indian Temple Mound Museum	Fort Walton Beach	
Chester Pruitt	First Black FWB Police Officer, Youth Mediator	Fort Walton Beach	
Ben Hill Griffin, Jr.	Citrus Baron, Civic Leader & Benefactor	Frostproof	
Latimer Maxcy	Citrus Grower & Processor, Cattle Rancher and Civic Leader	Frostproof	
Albert H. Blanding	Distinguished Soldier, National Guardsman & Civic leader	Gainesville	
Sarah Matheson	Missionary and Presbyterian Religious leader at Local, State & National levels	Gainesville	
Sarah Lucretia Robb	Alachua County's first female physician in the 1880s, making housecalls and authored book on "common sense" medicine for public use	Gainesville	
Jesse Earl Franklin	Postmaster, Church leader and Historic Preservationist	Glen St. Mary	
Alverdo Adair Geitgey	Baker County landowner & developer, Glen St. Mary founder, citrus & pecan grower	Glen St. Mary	
Isaiah Sherman Mikell	Railroad depot agent, farmer and community supporter during the depression	Glen St. Mary	
George Lindley Taber, Sr.	founded Glen Saint Mary Nursery, Florida State Horticulture Society president, developed cold-tolerant plants	Glen St. Mary	
Karlie Tyler	teacher, traveling librarian and volunteer librarian	Glen St. Mary	
John Preston Hall, Sr.	bank president & chairman of the board; sheriff for 36 years; director, treasurer & president of Florida Sheriffs Association; founder and treasurer of the Florida Sheriffs Boys Ranch	Green Cove Springs	
John Preston Hall, Jr.	deputy sheriff & bank president; ran family-owned land & timber company and children's charity, major donor to Florida Sheriffs' Youth Ranches	Green Cove Springs	
Ed Stansel	health department administrator; expanded services, built clinics, implemented first Health Department computer system, recruited doctors to donate time	Green Cove Springs	
Richard Reid Wagner	organized the fire department in 1930 and served as the unpaid fire chief for 62 years; often gave personal funds to fire victims	Green Cove Springs	
Catherine Powell Hickman	founded Gulfport Historical Society and museum; published Gulfport history; founded Gulfport Community Players & Girls Softball League and other youth activities	Gulfport	
Arnold S. White, Sr.	deputy director at veterans medical center, volunteer & employee of Little League Baseball for more than 40 years	Gulfport	
Donald Ray "Billy" Matthews	US Representative 1953–1967 & Teacher	Hawthorne	
Chester Shell	Hunting & fishing guide, Raised funds for 1st Black school in Alachua County	Hawthorne	
William Flemming	Founder of Holly Hill	Holly Hill	
Robert Anderson	Bank founder, president & director and City Commissioner	Hollywood	
Dorothy Walker Bush	Civic leader & wife of a US Senator, mother of a POTUS and grandmother of 2 governors & a POTUS	Hollywood	
Clarence P. Hammerstein	Citrus authority, tourism promoter, Broward Kiwanis founder	Hollywood	
Joseph Wesley Young	Founder & Developer of Hollywood, Florida	Hollywood	
Anne Kolb	Environmental preservationist and 1st female Broward County Commissioner	Hollywood	
Preston B. Bird	City Politician and Civic leader	Homestead	
Lily Lawrence Bow	Homestead Library Supporter and Book provider	Homestead	
May Mann Jennings	Women's Rights activist, Environmentalist & advocate for the welfare of children	Homestead	
William J. Krome	Railroad Surveyor & Engineer, Agriculture and Horticulture enthusiast	Homestead	
Max Losner	Bank President, Federal Reserve Board member, City Councilman and Civic leader	Homestead	
James Daniel Redd	Homestead founder and developer, City Councilman 1913-24, Dade County Commissioner 1921-41	Homestead	
James Archer Smith	World War I Army Doctor, Physician and Chief Surgeon of Dade County Hospital	Homestead	
David Levy Yulee	Lawyer, Florida Statehood leader, US Senator, Plantation owner, Railroad builder	Homosassa	
Napoleon Bonaparte Broward	Florida's 19th Governor 1905-1909, Duval Co. Sheriff & State Representative	Jacksonville	
J.J. Daniel	Businessman and Civic leader	Jacksonville	
Alfred I. du Pont	Philanthropist	Jacksonville	
David H. Dwight	Racial activist	Jacksonville	
Lex Hester	Government administrator	Jacksonville	
James Weldon Johnson	Educator, lawyer, diplomat & racial activist	Jacksonville	
Henry John Klutho	Architect	Jacksonville	
Abraham Lincoln Lewis	Insurance executive, Philanthropist & founder of American Beach	Jacksonville	
Eartha M. M. White	Clara White Mission founder, teacher, Nursing Home founder	Jacksonville	
Doris Whitmore	Jacksonville Museum of Science & History supporter/promoter	Jacksonville	
R.R. Ricou	Fishing business owner & Civic leader	Jensen Beach	
Bessie Wilson DuBois	Historian	Jupiter	
Joseph Verner Reed	Wildlife & Nature Conservationist and charitable benefactor	Jupiter Island	
Permelia Pryor Reed	Wildlife & Nature Conservationist and charitable benefactor	Jupiter Island	
William M. Beam	City Politician & man of action	Keystone Heights	
John Edward Larson	Local & State Politician, IRS Head for Florida	Keystone Heights	
Howard S. England	Benefactor of Fort Zachary Taylor	Key West	
Mel Fisher	Scuba Diver & Treasure Hunter	Key West	
Ernest Hemingway	Writer & Adventurer	Key West	
Walter Sayers Lightbourn	Tobacco grower and Cigar maker	Key West	
Harry S. Truman	POTUS	Key West	
Captain Melville Emory Forrey	farmer, dredge boat captain, general store owner & fur trader, city councilman, mayor and county commission chairman	LaBelle	
Francis A. Hendry	cattle rancher, Civil War Captain; helped establish Polk & Lee counties and Fort Myers; served as county commissioner & state representative; founder, mayor, town clerk, marshal, alderman and minister of LaBelle	LaBelle	
Rosabelle Blake	School teacher and administrator	Lakeland	
Thomas W. Bryant	lawyer, state representative, Board of Control member, University of Florida advocate	Lakeland	
Lawton Mainor Chiles	Florida's 41st Governor 1991-1998 & US Senator 1971-1989	Lakeland	
John Franklin Cox	mercantile owner, state representative, mayor, city treasurer and real estate developer	Lakeland	
Herbert J. Drane	real estate, insurance, railroad and citrus businessman; co-founder of Lakeland, clerk, treasurer and mayor, newspaper editor, state representative & senator, US representative and Federal Power Commission member	Lakeland	
Clare Henley	pharmacist, helped establish spring major league baseball training in Lakeland, Florida State League team owner and league manager	Lakeland	
Dr. John Sidney Jackson	Surgeon, City Commissioner & Mayor	Lakeland	
Paul Scott Linder	founded heavy construction machinery company, leader of several Florida business organizations	Lakeland	
J. Hardin Peterson	Congressman	Lakeland	
Park Trammell	Florida's 21st Governor 1913-1917	Lakeland	
Lassie Goodbread-Black	Teacher & Civic Leader	Lake City	
Fred P. Cone	Florida's 27th Governor 1937-1941	Lake City	
McKinley Jeffers	Educator & Civic Leader	Lake City	
May Vinzant Perkins	Writer, Historian	Lake City	
Betsy Hopkins	Philanthropist	Lake Helen	
John P. Mace	Architect/builder	Lake Helen	
Edward W. Bok	Editor, Philanthropist & founder of Bok Tower Gardens	Lake Wales	
Bertha Louise Hinshaw	Innkeeper	Lake Wales	
Delbert Lorenzo Layton	City Benefactor	Layton	
Hubert O. Dabney	Athlete & educator	Leesburg	
Joseph M. Tardugno, Jr.	Utility innovator	Leesburg	
Pat Thomas	city manager & Benefactor	Leesburg	
Porter Claude Crapps, Jr.	bank owner, large timberland owner, promoted advanced forestry practices, helped build vo-tech school, supported 4-H and FFA	Live Oak	
Thomas Dowling	established several lumber companies, built railroad to transport wood, funded Live Oak waterworks, helped build & rebuild Advent Christian Church, founded Advent Christian Village in Dowling Park	Live Oak	
Cary A. Hardee	Florida's 23rd Governor 1921-1925	Live Oak	
Brantly Walker Helvenston	Insurance agent, teacher, banker	Live Oak	
John Parshley	Civic leader	Live Oak	
Josiah B. Clouser	Hotelier and civic leader	Longwood	
Edwin B. Browning, Sr.	Teacher & Superintendent, Historical Society founder, newspaper columnist & radio show host	Madison	
Tommie Camilla Stephens Barfield	Confectionery operator, lobbied for infrastructure, worked to create Collier County; first superintendent of schools and board member	Marco Island	
William David Collier	mercantile store operator, discovered & donated fantastic trove of Indian artifacts, assisted clam farmers	Marco Island	
Theophilus West	Civil war surgeon, local physician & druggist, school superintendent, mayor and state senator	Marianna	
James Hartley Beal	scientist & pharmacist who collected plants & shells, donated them to museums; donated land & artesian well for first public water and sewer system	Mary Esther	
Thomas Jefferson Pryor, Jr.	general store manager, city councilman & mayor	Mary Esther	
Joe Wickham	surveyor with U.S. National Geodetic Survey, construction company owner, city councilman & county commissioner	Melbourne	
Dana A. Dorsey	first Black millionaire, established Mount Zion Baptist Church, bank, hotel & rental property owner, donated land for school & library	Miami	
David Grandison Fairchild	horticulturist with United States Department of Agriculture, 75,000 new plants to the US for cultivation	Miami	
Catherine Hauberg Sweeney	botanist, philanthropist & preservationist, especially the Coconut Grove estate, The Kampong, which contained rare and exotic tropical plants	Miami	
Barbara Baer Capitman	Art Deco design preservationist and author	Miami Beach	
John Stiles Collins	Horticulturist & avocado grower, dredged Collins Canal and started Collins Bridge, built Hotel, Casino & began residential development	Miami Beach	
Stephen J. Cranman	Director of the Perrine-Cutler Ridge Council: redevelop area following Hurricane Andrew by attracting business with 3,000 jobs, US 1 Beautification, Community & Cultural Centers	Miami Beach	
L. Murray Dixon	architect who developed Miami Beach's Tropical Art Deco style of architecture	Miami Beach	
John J. Farrey	Chief Building, Plumbing and Electrical Inspector who initiated & enforced first Building Code, copied by 5,000+ communities	Miami Beach	
Carl Graham Fisher	Miami promoter & real estate developer, completed Collins Bridge, dredged Biscayne Bay, built Lincoln & Dixie Highways	Miami Beach	
Henry Hohauser	Prolific architect who promulgated modernism in Miami Beach architecture	Miami Beach	
Anna Brenner Meyers	Integration leader for Miami schools, helped found Miami Dade College, started first educational TV station in Florida, WPBT	Miami Beach	
Glenn Hammond Curtiss	Aircraft Motor builder, aviator and developer of Hialeah, Miami Springs & Opa-locka	Miami Springs	
Chief Micanopy	Leader of the Seminole Nation at Cuscowilla during the Second Seminole War	Micanopy	
Archie Carr	International biologist & environmentalist, honored nature author	Micanopy	
Marjorie Carr	First female wildlife specialist at US Fish & Wildlife Service, founder of Florida Defenders of the Environment	Micanopy	
Bennett C. Russell	Teacher, Administrator & Superintendent, using technology as educational tool	Milton	
Reuben Wyatt Harper	Citrus grower, broker & industry leader, City Councilman	Montverde	
Henry B. Watkins, Sr.	real estate developer for most of Naples, donated 10 acres (40,000 m^{2}) for downtown park	Naples	
Henry B. Watkins, Jr.	built first low-income housing in Naples, Edison Community College trustee, founded youth shelter, aa facility for mentally ill and local YMCA	Naples	
Henry Nehrling	ornithologist and horticulturist; introduced caladiums, palms, bamboo, and amaryllis to the US	Naples	
Elroy M. Avery	Mayor, Author, Businessman, Bank Chairman & Civic leader	New Port Richey	
Gene Sarazen	first golf professional to win all four Grand Slam events; invented sand wedge, founded charitable foundation	New Port Richey	
George E. Musson	civic leader and mayor who promoted road & bridge projects and revitalized downtown area	New Smyrna Beach	
Al E. Fellner	Mayor, Civic leader, Businessman	North Redington Beach	
Peter Raulerson	postmaster, mayor, county commissioner and school trustee	Okeechobee	
Ransom Eli Olds	Oldsmobile inventor; purchased land, platted & founded Oldsmar; built a sawmill & foundry	Oldsmar	
Dr. Francis Dickinson	Surgeon, Benefactor, Philanthropist & champion of Women's Suffrage	Orange City	
Dr. Seth French	Physician, Florida: Promoter, Senator & Commissioner of Immigration	Orange City	
Alfred Benjamin "A. B." Michael	ship captain, successful citrus grower known as "Dean of the Florida Citrus Industry"	Orchid	
Martin Andersen	newspaper owner & editor, used paper to influence politicians & public to build roads, an airport and develop nearby Port Canaveral	Orlando	
William A. (Bill) McCree, Jr.	civil engineer & general contractor; chairman of planning board that developed the first comprehensive development plan & capital improvements program	Orlando	
Walter C. Meloon	founded the Florida Variety Boat Company which became Correct Craft; built Army boats in World War II, Ski Nautique in 1951	Orlando	
Oakes Ames	founding director of the American Orchid Society, prolific author, museum curator & director	Ormond Beach	
John Anderson	county tax assessor, built a plantation, Ormond Hotel & area's first golf course; organized first auto race on the beach & professional baseball team	Ormond Beach	
Eileen Butts	botanical specimens collector; helped create state parks & an art gallery; raised money to restore The Casements; civic leader	Ormond Beach	
James Carnell	citrus grower, jelly factory owner, real estate agent, city councilman, postmaster & yachtsman	Ormond Beach	
Charles McNary	alderman, councilman, mayor and justice of the peace	Ormond Beach	
Joseph Price	county commissioner & mayor; built & managed Ormond Hotel; organized first auto race on the beach	Ormond Beach	
John D. Rockefeller	Industrialist & Philanthropist	Ormond Beach	
Edith Stanton	teacher, newspaper & magazine writer; book author	Ormond Beach	
Elsa Scherer Burrows	created & preserved Oscar Scherer Park and donated it to the state	Osprey	
Francis Stephen Huggins	World War II Navy Veteran, retired government employee, tireless civic leader	Palm Bay	
Henry Morrison Flagler	Industrialist and Developer	Palm Beach	
Francis MacKay Howze	teacher, "the Mother of Education in Manatee County", coach, financial sponsor, civic leader	Palmetto	
Francis F. Taylor	realtor, land developer & city promoter; benefactor of youth programs & young adults; donated land for parks	Palmetto	
George Mortimer West	land developer, newspaper founder, author, town councilman and public library founder	Panama City	
Delbert Davis	Schoolteacher, Scoutmaster, surveyor, musician and photographer	Parker	
Captain Ed Parker	Boat captain, environmentalist and seafood industry founder	Parker	
Charles W. Flanagan	City commissioner, mayor and civic leader	Pembroke Pines	
James Cash Penney	Businessman and philanthropist, created Penney Farms Retirement Community in Clay County	Penney Farms	
H. Clay Armstrong	Founder of the Pensacola Classical School, mayor and author	Pensacola	
William Dudley Chipley	County commissioner, City councilman and mayor, state senator; financed Pensacola & Atlantic Railroad	Pensacola	
Occie Clubbs	teacher and principal; Pensacola Historical Society and Florida Historical Society president	Pensacola	
Mayhew W. (Pat) Dodson III	Florida Board of Regents member and promoter of University of West Florida; historic preservationist	Pensacola	
Daniel "Chappie" James	Four-star general in the U.S. Air Force from Eglin Air Force Base who served in World War II, Korea and Vietnam	Pensacola	
Lillie Anna "Mother" James	established private colored school whose graduates became Doctors, Lawyers, Teachers and Military officers	Pensacola	
Stephen Russell Mallory	Lawyer, State Representative & Senator, United States Congressman & Senator	Pensacola	
Edward A. Perry	Florida's 14th Governor 1885-1889; teacher, lawyer, Civil War Brigadier General	Pensacola	
Mary Turner Rule Reed	Historic Restoration and Preservationist	Pensacola	
Oliver J. Semmes, Jr.	City engineer and Manager noted for paving 150 miles (240 km) of streets, purchased the municipally owned gas company and negotiated a favorable franchise agreement with the local power company	Pensacola	
Joyce Garrett Turner	Teacher and Historic Preservationist	Pensacola	
T. T. Wentworth, Jr.	Founder of Pensacola Historical Society, Pensacola Historical Museum & Wentworth Museum in Ensley; helped establish Pensacola Public Library	Pensacola	
P.K. Yonge	Businessman & civic leader who served almost 30 years as a member and chairman of Florida Board of Control	Pensacola	
William Thomas Cash	Educator, State Representative, author, campaign financial disclosed law sponsor and First State Librarian: 1927-51	Perry	
Edwin F. Deicke	Agricultural pioneer & author, Philanthropist	Plantation	
Lois Deicke	Philanthropist and Civic leader	Plantation	
Helen B. Hoffman	Original resident of Plantation. With husband, Dr. Abram Hoffman, started the Plantation Homeowners Association; PHA secretary for 40+ years. Founded the Plantation Library and local Agency on Aging.	Plantation	
Frederick C. Peters	Everglades Rancher & Farmer, Agricultural pioneer and donated land to church, city, county & state agencies	Plantation	
Jessie Ball du Pont	Spouse of Alfred I. du Pont, Benefactor & Philanthropist, brother of Edward Ball	Port St. Joe	
David W. Jones	Head coach at Washington County High School who personally visited his students' homes and their churches, teaching them respect, responsibility, perseverance, initiative, kindness, fairness, honesty and cooperation.	Port St. Joe	
Witt A. Campbell	Educator and Civil Rights worker	Quincy	
Dr. William Spencer Stevens	First Black Physician, pharmacist, Built "Colored" Hospital & Supervisor of City Schools	Quincy	
Judge Hugh M. Taylor	Lawyer, State Representative, Judge & Florida Constitutional Revision Commission Chairman	Quincy	
Odet Philippe	Early citrus grower who introduced grapefruit to Florida; first cigar maker in Tampa	Safety Harbor	
Peter Demens	Russian immigrant citrus grower, constructed railroad stations and supplied crossties; took over bankrupt Orange Belt Railway and named St. Petersburg, Florida, for Saint Petersburg, Russia	San Antonio	
Judge Edmund F. Dunne	western judge forced to resign due to mixing church and state; founder of San Antonio	San Antonio	
James J. Horgan	History professor at St. Leo College; historical society president, Florida Historical Society board member, prolific author and NAACP chapter founder	San Antonio	
Frank P. Bailey	Farmer, general store owner, started Sanibel Packing Company; founded the Sanibel Community Church, helped build Sanibel Community House, setup telephone system, served as justice of the peace	Sanibel	
Owen Burns	established the Burns Realty and Burns Dredging companies; Burns Construction built Ringling Causeways, laid out and paved streets, built seawalls, first co-op subdivision and El Vernona Hotel	Sarasota	
John L. Early	Lawyer, school board attorney, school trustee, state representative and mayor	Sarasota	
Arthur Britton Edwards	sold real estate & insurance; tax assessor, mayor, established county tax assessor and bank VP	Sarasota	
John Hamilton Gillespie	Scottish head of the Florida Mortgage and Investment Company, attorney & real estate agent, justice of the peace, built DeSoto Hotel, mayor and councilman; built one of the first golf courses in US, laid out courses in Jacksonville, Tampa, Kissimmee and Bellair	Sarasota	
Dr. Joseph Halton	Surgeon who did many free operations, town councilman and council president	Sarasota	
Harry Lee Higel	General store owner, boat owner, land developer, bank director, town councilman and mayor	Sarasota	
David and George Lindsay	Father & Son editor and publisher of the Sarasota Herald-Tribune	Sarasota	
Andrew McAnsh	Builder of the Mira Mar Hotel	Sarasota	
Thomas Reed Martin	prolific architect	Sarasota	
Charles Ringling	Circus founder, real estate investor who developed downtown; chamber of commerce president and bank founder	Sarasota	
John Ringling	Circus founder, real estate investor who developed beaches; art collector who willed his art, museum and home to the state of Florida	Sarasota	
Marie Selby	Created botanical garden at her residence; willed to the community; established a Foundation which gave 3,000 grants worth $50 million for education and scholarships	Sarasota	
Ernest Arthur Smith	real estate investor and abstract company president; chamber of commerce organizer and mayor; improved water service and fire protection; acquired land for future civic projects	Sarasota	
Karl Wallenda	family patriarch of a circus high wire act for 50 years	Sarasota	
Percy L. Hedgecock	First mayor, school board member, helped build first local school and acquire only oceanfront park; helped found Brevard Engineering College and served as trustee	Satellite Beach	
Paul Kroegal	Ship Captain, first County commissioner and chairman; built the first paved road from Micco to Stuart and the first Sebastian River bridge; first National Wildlife Refuge warden in America	Sebastian	
Margaret Shippen Roebling	Donated money to acquire land for the 8,140-acre (32.9 km^{2}) Highlands Hammock State Park when the National Park Service declined and the state had no money at height of depression	Sebring	
Dr. Andrew Anderson, Jr.	Physician, Philanthropist & Benefactor	St. Augustine	
Frank B. Butler	Businessman, civic & political leader; founder of "colored" Butler Beach	St. Augustine	
Felix deCrano	Accomplished portrait, landscape, genre and still life painter in Henry Flagler's artist colony	St. Augustine	
Earl Cunningham	self-taught American folk artist who painted schooners and portrayals of Seminole Indian life that he infused with images of Viking ships	St. Augustine	
Anna Maria Dummett	Boarding house owner, Civil War nurse, spy and caregiver; president & founder of Ladies Memorial Association, established a Confederate memorial	St. Augustine	
Louisa Fatio	owner/operator of several boarding houses; Fatio House was among city's best	St. Augustine	
Henry Morrison Flagler	Industrialist and Developer	St. Augustine	
Walter B. Fraser	City commissioner & mayor, state senator, organized city's first formal restoration movement, Colonial St. Augustine; donated the statues of Ponce de León & Pedro Menendez at the North City Gate	St. Augustine	
Nina Hawkins	Newspaper reporter & editor; founded the Florida Women's Press Club; founded the St. Augustine Art Association; included much local history in paper to encourage historic preservation movement	St. Augustine	
Martin Johnson Heade	portrait and genre painter early, then focused on landscapes, especially salt marshes; Henry Flagler was his wealthy patron	St. Augustine	
Lawerence Lewis, Jr.	Chairman of the Flagler Systems, established Flagler College and provided scholarships, endowments and new buildings; president of the Historic St. Augustine Preservation Board and the St. Augustine Foundation	St. Augustine	
William Wing Loring	Florida militiaman, lawyer and governor of the Florida Territory; first US Congressman from Florida; U.S. Army officer; Confederate Brigadier General; led contingent of Union & Confederate officers in Egypt setting up that country's defense	St. Augustine	
Dr. Luella Day McConnell	Physician, Yukon Gold Rush participant, created Fountain of Youth tourist attraction, eloquent story teller and local character known as Diamond Lil	St. Augustine	
Albert Manucy	Authority on St. Augustine history & architecture; worked for National Park Service, studied Spanish architecture on Fulbright Scholarship; authored two books on St. Augustine	St. Augustine	
Pedro Menendez de Aviles	Spanish Captain and Explorer	St. Augustine	
Prince Napoleon Achille Murat	Crown prince of Naples; authored several works, studied law and government	St. Augustine	
Francisco Pellicer	Successful early carpenter, moved south on Matanzaz River; Pellicer Creek is named after him	St. Augustine	
Xavier Lopez Pellicer	Bank VP, Flagler Hospital trustee & president; historical society president & director; president of the Florida Bankers Association, president of Florida Forestry Association; Civic leader	St. Augustine	
Verle Pope	businessman and large landowner, elected to Florida House of Representatives, but went into Army in World War II; elected to Senate, served as president; approved the Florida Constitutional revision of 1968, established the community college system, created the Historic St. Augustine Preservation Board and supported the Florida School for the Deaf and the Blind.	St. Augustine	
Robert Ripley	Cartoonist, Entrepreneur and amateur Anthropologist; creator of Ripley's Believe It or Not!	St. Augustine	
Edmund Kirby Smith	Career US Army officer, educator, and a general in the Confederate Army during the American Civil War	St. Augustine	
Frances Kirby Smith	most successful Confederate spy	St. Augustine	
Franklin W. Smith	Built Villa Zorayda using cement mixed with coquina; encouraged Flagler to use Spanish architecture for his hotels; built the Casa Monica Hotel; historic preservationist	St. Augustine	
Thomas Buckingham Smith	Lawyer, city councilman, territorial legislator, worked for US State Department in Mexico and Spain, researched Spanish settlement in Florida and translated documents from Spanish or Portuguese to English; authored several works; Florida Tax Commissioner	St. Augustine	
Elizabeth Morley Towers	lifelong historic preservationist; served on the St. Augustine Preservation Board and the Florida State Park Board	St. Augustine	
Henry L. Twine	NAACP chapter president, city commissioner and vice mayor; Democratic Party Executive Committee member	St. Augustine	
F. Charles Usina	state representative who worked for a state mental health program and supported the Florida School for the Deaf and the Blind, serving on the school's Board of Trustees; member and leader of Kiwanis, Chamber of Commerce, Knights of Columbus, Elks, Moose, the St. Augustine Historical Society and the Committee of 100	St. Augustine	
Father Felix Varela	priest and Professor of Philosophy; established church ministry in New York City where he founded schools for children, built churches and evangelized the poor; on the road to sainthood	St. Augustine	
Emily Lloyd Wilson	Artist who purchased a residence in Henry Flagler's artist colony; researched St. Augustine's history in Tallahassee and Washington, D.C.; her notes and copies of maps, documents and Spanish records became the St. Augustine Historical Society's library; she served as librarian and historian for the society	St. Augustine	
Frank T. Hurley	World War I & World War II Army Staff Officer, Real Estate & Mortgage Executive, Civic leader	St. Pete Beach	
Thomas J. Rowe	Beachfront Hotel owner	St. Pete Beach	
Earl Morrow Clark	Teacher & Headmaster, School Accreditation Leader	St. Petersburg	
Dr. Paul R. Hortin	Methodist Minister, Hunter, Fisherman	St. Petersburg	
Morris Raiford Johns	Pineapple grower, Businessman & Deputy Sheriff	Stuart	
Walter Kitching	Businessman, Banker, Justice of the Peace & Philanthropist	Stuart	
George W. Parks	Businessman, Bank founder, Councilman & Mayor	Stuart	
James R. Pomeroy	Educator, County Politician, Postmaster & Businessman	Stuart	
Dan Pearl	Politician & Civic leader	Sunrise	
J. Broward Culpepper	FSU Dean and Secretary/Director of the Florida Board of Control	Tallahassee	
B. Calvin Jones	Archaeologist and Discoverer of multiple Historic sites	Tallahassee	
William Valentine Knott	State Auditor, Treasurer, Comptroller	Tallahassee	
Catherine Murat	Historic Preservationist, Civil War supporter	Tallahassee	
James Page	Florida's first Black minister, church founder, County Commissioner, Senate Chaplain and Justice of the Peace	Tallahassee	
Romulus Hunter Thompson	Band Director	Tallahassee	
Curtis L. Waller	Attorney, State Legislator, State Attorney, Circuit Judge and Federal Court of Appeals Judge	Tallahassee	
Cesar Gonzmart	Expanded Columbia Restaurant, Ybor City Historic District promoter, Civic leader	Tampa	
Celestino Vega	Cigar maker, President of Centro Español and promoter of Spanish arts & culture	Tampa	
Vicente Martinez Ybor	Founder & Developer of Ybor City, Cigar maker and Labor supporter	Tampa	
Peter Themis Assimack	CPA, Chamber of Commerce President and Civic leader	Tarpon Springs	
John K. Cheyney	Sponge Company & Sponge Exchange founder, local politician and Sponge Industry promoter	Tarpon Springs	
Thomas Craig	Businessman, City Commissioner & Mayor	Tarpon Springs	
George Frantzis	Greek Lawyer who helped liberate Dodecanese Islands from Italy & reunite with Greece; School Principal & Sponge Industry saviour	Tarpon Springs	
George Inness, Jr.	Successful Landscape and Figure Artist; spouse Julia Inness founded the Tarpon Springs Library	Tarpon Springs	
Demos A. Megaloudis	Business and Civic leader	Tarpon Springs	
Anson Peasely Killen Safford	Nevada Surveyor General, Governor of the Arizona Territory, Land Developer and Tarpon Springs Founder	Tarpon Springs	
Mary J. Stafford	Teacher at Boston University College of Medicine and first practicing woman physician in Florida	Tarpon Springs	
Colonel Henry McKie Salley	Army Engineer, Airport & Bridge builder and city manager	Tarpon Springs	
Alexander St. Clair-Abrams	Lawyer and Founder/Developer of Tavares	Tavares	
James Hudson Baker	Building contractor	Vero Beach	
Merrill P. Barber	Politician & Banker	Vero Beach	
Alex MacWilliam, Sr.	Politician & Builder	Vero Beach	
Garnett L. Radin	Nurse & founder of Indian River Memorial Hospital	Vero Beach	
Waldo E. Sexton	Citrus Grower & Processor, Dairy farmer	Vero Beach	
Sherman N. Smith, Jr.	Lawyer, Prosecutor, Politician & Judge	Vero Beach	
Herman Julius Zeuch	Developer and Citrus farmer	Vero Beach	
Edward Ball	du Pont Trust Manager & Philanthropist	Wakulla Springs	
W. Curtis Ezelle	Local politician & Civic leader	Wauchula	
Edward R. Bradley	Philanthropist	West Palm Beach	
Dr. Joseph Wiley Jenkins	Pharmacist & Society Host	West Palm Beach	
Marvin U. Mounts	Agricultural leader	West Palm Beach	
Dr. Thomas Rudolph Vickers	African-American Healthcare provider	West Palm Beach	
Nellie A. Grice	Businessperson & Civic leader	Windermere	
Dr. John Howard Johnson	Philanthropist	Windermere	
John Calvin Palmer	Politician & Philanthropist	Windermere	
Dick Pope, Sr.	Cypress Gardens Founder & Tourism Promoter	Windermere	
Loring A. Chase	Winter Park Founder	Winter Park	
Jeannette Genius McKean	Painter and Rollins College benefactor	Winter Park	
Albin Polasek	Sculptor and Cultural Leader	Winter Park	
Alice Fryer Hall	Teacher, Journalist & Civic leader	Zephyrhills	
