= Robert Anderson (banker) =

Robert Anderson (1912–1998) was a banker and community leader in Hollywood, Florida. He is on the List of Great Floridians.

Anderson came to Miami from New York in 1922 with his family and, responding to marketing by Joseph W. Young, soon settled in Hollywood. The family survived the 1926 hurricane that hit the area.

Anderson was a founder of the Bank of Hollywood in 1950. He served on the Hollywood City Commission for five years from 1966. Cathy Anderson, his wife, served on the commission from 1975. Cathy and Bob Anderson Park was named in their honor in 1991. Anderson, an Eagle Scout, also served with the Boyscouts throughout his life.

The Anderson's experiences with segregation and the Ku Klux Klan, after Robert hired a black teller, are chronicled in Race and Change in Hollywood Florida.

Anderson's Great Floridian plaque is located at the Hollywood Railroad Station Museum Civic Center at 2940 Hollywood Boulevard.
