= George Frantzis =

American lawyer

- Born: George Theodosios Frantzis; January 13, 1911; Greece
- Died: May 30, 1970 (aged 59); Pinellas, Florida
- Occupations: Lawyer, school principal, community leader and writer
- Children: Theodosios "Ted" Frantzis; Fanitsa Meehan

George Theodosios Frantzis (January 13, 1911 – May 30, 1970) was a Greek-American lawyer, school principal, community leader and supporter of the sponge industry in Tarpon Springs, Florida.

== Career ==
He was involved in war-relief efforts during World War II. Frantzis founded the Kalymnian Island Refugee Relief Committee for war relief in 1942.

In January 1943, Frantzis helped Tarpon Springs obtain a 70-ton marble altar from Mount Pentele, in Athens, Greece, that was part of Greece's entry into the 1939 New York World's Fair, held in Queens, New York. Frantzis was a special secretary to the Greek community of Tarpon Springs and written to the Greek Embassy in Washington, D.C., for the marble to be used in the community's new St. Nicholas Greek Orthodox Church.

When the Tarpon sponge industry was in trouble in the 1950s he led efforts to restore it. Frantzis also organized the Committee for Reorganization of the Sponge Industry in 1955, serving as the group's first president.

Frantzis owned several local businesses. His family has been active in the community for generations.

=== Writing ===
Frantzis wrote Strangers at Ithaca: The Story of the Spongers of Tarpon Springs (St. Petersburg, FL: Great Outdoors Association, 1962; OCLC 1687861), an account of the sponge divers and development of the Greek community in Tarpon Springs.

== Award ==
Frantzis is listed as a Great Floridian as part of the Great Floridians 2000 program sponsored by the Florida League of Cities and the Florida Department of State. The Great Floridian plaque for him is located at the site of his retail building at 715 Dodecanese Boulevard.

== Personal life ==
Theodosios "Ted" Frantzis is his son and Fanitsa Meehan his daughter.

== See also ==
- List of American writers
- List of Great Floridians
- List of Greek Americans
- List of non-fiction writers
- List of people from Florida
