= Edith Stanton =

Edith P. Foulke Stanton (1875–1962) was an American teacher, writer for newspapers and magazines, and author. She lived in Ormond Beach, Florida and is listed as a Great Floridian. Her son shared her interest in history.

== Bibliography ==
- “Ruins of Early Plantations” by Edith P. Stanton, Ormond Beach, Flagler Library Collection.
- A History of the Ormond Union Church: Ormond Beach Florida 1943 - Ormond Beach (Fla.)
- Early Plantations of the Halifax: Concerning the Ruins 1949 Ormond Village Improvement Association 1949
