= Marie Holderman =

American newspaper editor

Marie Ringo Holderman
- Born: Ella Marie Ringo; July 28, 1884; Brazil, Indiana, U.S.
- Died: February 21, 1968 (aged 83); Cocoa, Florida, U.S.
- Education: Indiana State University
- Occupations: Newspaper editor, publisher, owner
- Spouse: Chauncey Harcourt Holderman
- Children: 1

Marie Holderman was an American newspaper owner, editor and publisher of the Cocoa Tribune for almost 50 years, known as the "First Lady of Florida Journalism".

== Early life ==
Holderman was born in Brazil, Indiana, near Terre Haute in west central Indiana. She was the eldest of four children and her father worked in a tile factory. She attended Indiana State University then married Chauncey Holderman on October 12, 1905. The couple moved to Bradenton on Florida's west coast, where he was general manager of the Bradenton Light & Power Company. In 1913 an injury to his spine left Chauncey as a wheelchair user. With her husband's physical limitations, she purchased the weekly Manatee Record and went to work.

== Career and work ==
After she saw an ad seeking a publisher for a local newspaper in Brevard County on Florida's east coast, she sold the Manatee and moved her daughter and husband to Cocoa, a fishing community of about 900 residents. Holderman founded the Cocoa Tribune in 1917 with a couple of employees. The publication grew as did the community. She was known as a savvy businesswoman whose newspaper swayed public opinion on issues including women's suffrage and the opening of the Sebastian Inlet. She became one of the most influential publishers in Florida leading to her selection as president of the Florida Press Association in 1930. "She was a relentless voice urging community improvement, from roads to schools," wrote historian Roy Laughlin in Good to Hear from You Again, a historical memoir of the Cocoa area. According to her obituary, Holderman was a member of the state's library board, a charter member of the Cocoa Women's League, a committeewoman for the Florida Democratic party and was named honorary Lieutenant Colonel of governor David Sholtz's staff in 1933.

== Sale of newspaper ==
Paul Miller became president and CEO of Gannett in 1957 when the group held 19 newspapers over four states; Florida not among them. He became frustrated after repeated unsuccessful attempts to acquire a foothold in Florida, then targeted Brevard County. He spoke to Marie Holderman and shared his plan for a morning daily paper in Brevard. Holderman wasn't interested. Over the next few years, several Gannett representatives attempted to negotiate a purchase, without success. In the late 1950s, Al Neuharth was assistant managing editor at the Miami Herald and became acquainted with Marie Holderman. In 1963 he was hired by Miller to manage the Democrat and Chronicle in Rochester, New York, Gannett's headquarters. He asked Miller for an opportunity to persuade Holderman. In their meeting, Neuharth complimented the Tribune, but told Holderman that she lacked the resources to win a competition. Holderman was invited to Rochester for a meeting to talk with Gannett executives. The Gannett corporate airplane flew four people from Florida to New York. John Pound, managing editor joined Holderman and her two granddaughters on the trip in May 1965. Convinced of Gannett's determination and at age 81, Holderman decided to sell, and Pound told the executives they wanted $1.9 million in compensation. Neuharth's response: "We told them that was a fair price and we certainly paid her more than she expected to get."

== Residence ==
Marie Holderman and her husband built the "Haywire House" in 1918 at 61 Mulberry Street in Cocoa. The 3,700 ft^{2} two-story home was constructed of old-growth pine from Merritt Island that has lasted over one hundred years through multiple hurricanes including Charley in 2004 and Nicole in 2022. The structure contains four bedrooms upstairs, three baths and hosted innumerable parties over the years. The dining room still contains a 1930s hand-painted mural of Florida wildlife on all four walls. After her family and her paper, her house was her life. Dinners and "evening socials" were routine. Brown rice and shrimp was the signature dish, thanks to Holderman's talented cook. According to the architectural heritage book, Not to be Missed, "the Holderman home was often where visiting dignitaries, political officials and political candidates, businesspeople and her extensive social circle met for social affairs." The historic structure remained Mrs. Holderman's home until her death. She freely made her home library of Florida history books available to other readers and published stories of Cocoa's history in her newspaper, solicited from local pioneers in the community.

The original offices for the Cocoa Tribune were built across the street from her residence, which today houses the Catherine Schweinsberg Rood Central Library. Mrs. Holderman was named a Great Floridian in 2000 and her plaque is displayed there along with a meeting room named in her honor.

== Family ==
Of her three children, only one, Mary Jane, survived to adulthood, but died at age 49, leaving Holderman to raise two granddaughters. Chauncey Holderman died in 1928 at age 57. Marie was 83 when she died in 1968, two years after selling her newspaper.
