= J. Broward Culpepper =

American educator (1907–1990)

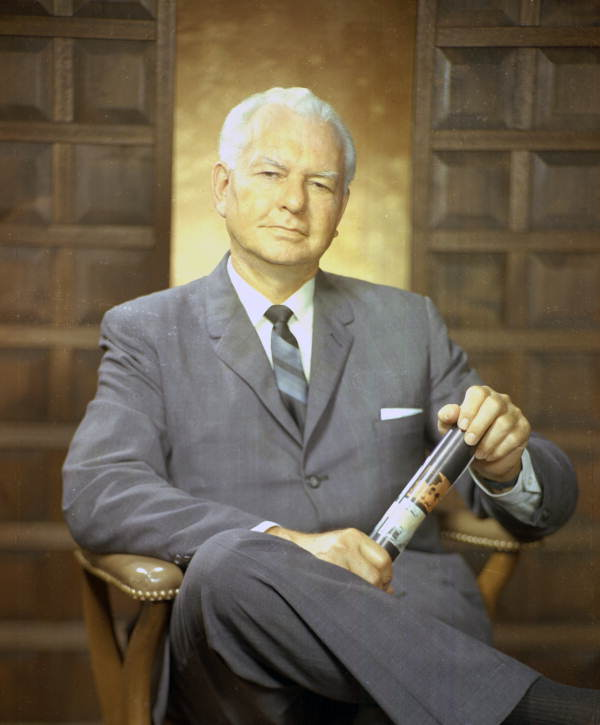
- Born: John Broward Culpepper; December 9, 1907; Perry, Florida
- Died: April 7, 1990 (aged 82); Denton, Texas
- Education: University of Florida; Ohio State University; Columbia University
- Known for: Director of the Florida Board of Control and first Chancellor of the State University System of Florida
- Spouse: Betty Dunn Culpepper
- Relatives: Brad Culpepper (grandson)

John Broward Culpepper (December 9, 1907 – April 7, 1990) was a leader in university education in Florida. He was designated a Great Floridan in 2000.

== Education ==
Culpepper was born in Perry, Florida. His undergraduate work was completed at the University of Florida in 1929 where he was a member of Theta Chi fraternity. He received a Master of Arts from the Ohio State University. then an educational doctorate from Columbia University. He married the former Betty Dunn and they had two sons, John Blair and Philip Bruce.

== Career ==
Culpepper was Principal at P.K. Yonge Developmental Research School in Gainesville, Florida from 1935-1938; Principal at Leesburg, Florida's High School from 1940-1941; Principal at Leon High School in Tallahassee, Florida from 1941-1944. He was Dean of Men at Florida State University from 1947-1954. In 1954, he became the first Chancellor of State University System of Florida, serving until 1968. The University of West Florida, University of South Florida and Florida Atlantic University were created by Culpepper before he took a position at Texas Woman’s University to be closer to family. He was designated a Great Floridian by the Florida Department of State in the Great Floridians 2000 Program. A plaque attesting to the honor is located at Leon High School in Tallahassee, Florida.
