= Celestino Vega =

Celestino Lester Vega was a cigar maker, President of Centro Español and a promoter of Spanish arts and culture. He is listed as a Great Floridian. Vega was born in Asturias, Spain November 27, 1897. He emigrated to Tampa. He faced labor protests and demands from strikers. Mrs. Celestino Vega (Carolina Sanchez Vega?) was on the board of the Tampa League of Women's Clubs.
