= Alverdo Adair Geitgey =

Alverdo Adair Geitgey Geitgey (1864–1932) was a Baker County, Florida landowner and developer who helped found Glen St. Mary. He was also a citrus grower and a pecan grower. Geitgey is listed as a Great Floridian.

Geitgey was born in Ohio. He worked in the natural gas business and spent winters in North Florida where he purchased more than 12,000 acres in Baker County. In 1916, he relocated to Glen St. Mary and began developing the town and agriculture.
