= George Gause =

American politician who served as mayor of Bloomington, Illinois

Mayor of Bartow, Florida
- In office 1971–1977

Personal details
- Died: 1986

George Henry Gause, Jr. (died in 1986) was a mortician and politician from Florida. He served as mayor of Bartow, Florida. and also served as a commissioner. He was an African American and was named as a Great Floridian. He also served on the Polk County School Board.

== Personal life and education ==
Gause's father was a naval architect and had a funeral home in Wilmington, North Carolina before moving to Florida for health reasons. Gause Jr. went to Union Academy High School in Bartow.

== Political career ==
He served two terms as Bartow's mayor from 1971 to 1977.

Gause was interviewed in 1975, for the Button Project.

== Honors ==
There is a George H. Gause Elementary school located in Bartow, Florida, while two streets are named after him. The Martin Luther King Day celebration in Bartow honors him in its name. In 2002, he was inducted into the Polk County Public Schools Hall of Fame.
