= James Horgan =

American historian

James J. Horgan (July 14, 1940 – May 3, 1997) was an American historian, academic and author. He was a history professor at Saint Leo University in St. Leo, Florida for 35 years, a historical society president, a Florida Historical Society board member, a prolific author and an NAACP chapter founder. He is listed as a Great Floridian.

He was head of the history department at Saint Leo University from the 1960s through the mid-1990s until just before his death due to cancer. Horgan was a member of the Tampa chapter of Mensa.

Born in Springfield, Massachusetts, Horgan received his Ph.D. in history in 1965 from Saint Louis University. In 1968, he was a founding officer of the Pasco County, Florida chapter of the NAACP, and the same year received a distinguished service award from the Florida NAACP.

Horgan authored Pioneer College: The Centennial History of Saint Leo College, Saint Leo Abbey, and Holy Name Priory, chronicling the founding of Saint Leo in 1889 as a boys' preparatory school and its evolution over the following century to university status.

== Legacy ==
The Florida Historical Society's James J. Horgan Award is named in his honor. Saint Leo University has a fund named in his honor, the James J. Horgan Heritage Society.

His "Great Floridian" plaque is installed at the James J. Horgan Home in San Antonio, Florida near Saint Leo University.

== Books ==
- Florida Decades: A Sesquicentennial History, 1845-1995 with Lewis N. Wynne (1995)
- The Historic Places of Pasco County (1992)
- City of Flight: The History of Aviation in St. Louis
- Social Justice: Teachings of Catholics, Protestants, Jews, and Muslims with Lucy Fuchs and Jeanine Jacob (1992)
- Pioneer College: The Centennial History of Saint Leo College, Saint Leo Abbey, and Holy Name Priory (1989)
- The Reagan Years: Perspectives & Assessments with Joseph A. Cernik (1988)
- Samuel Pasco of Pasco County (1987)
- Hail the Passing, Guard the Tomb: Voter Literacy Tests (1982)
