= Thomas F. Fleming Jr =

American businessman and civic leader

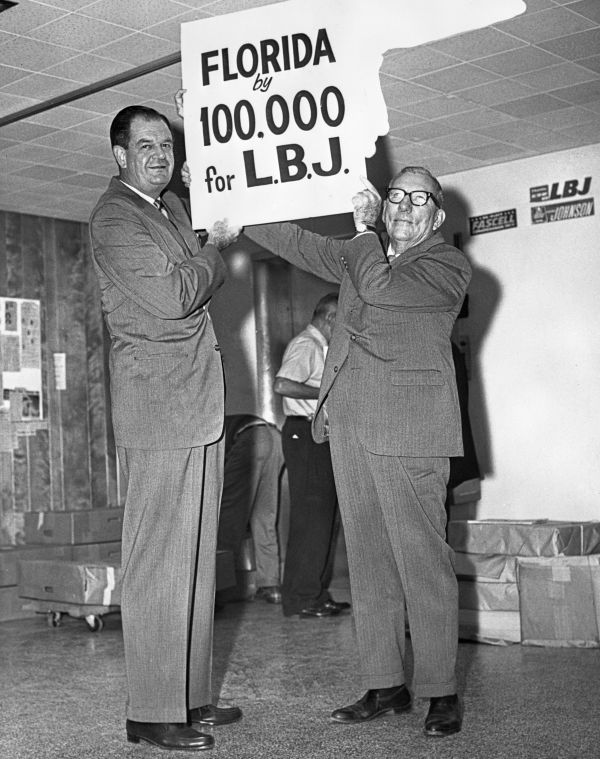
- Thomas F. Fleming, Jr. (left) with U.S. Representative Claude Pepper.

Thomas Farrar Fleming Jr. (1916–1976) was an American businessman and civic leader. He was instrumental in establishing Florida Atlantic University and his advocacy for higher education in the state of Florida.

Fleming was born in Sparta, Georgia. Fleming graduated from the University of Florida in 1938 and earned a master's degree from Harvard Business School. He moved to Boca Raton in 1940, where he founded and served as president of First Bank and Trust Company, the city's first permanent bank. Under his leadership, the bank pledged one percent of its profits before taxes to support higher education in Florida. In 1948 Fleming was a large proponent of Educational Bonds Amendment which would authorize the use of bonds to finance construction of state universities, community colleges, and vocational educational facilities. It failed to reach the minimum number of votes needed to pass.

Fleming was a central figure in the push to establish a university on 4,000 acres that once held the Boca Raton Army Air Field. Eventually 1,000 acres would be given for what would become Florida Atlantic University. After failing to get funding from state legislature, Fleming organized an Endowment Corporation which would ultimately raise $300,000.

Fleming managed President Lyndon B. Johnson's Florida campaign for the 1964 presidential election.

In 1975 he served as an economist in the Division of Economic Growth for the Bureau of Labor Statistics.

The College of Business building at Florida Atlantic University was named Fleming Hall in 1977, one year after his death. Fleming died of cancer in 1976.

In 2000 Fleming was listed as one of Florida's "Great Floridians" under the Great Floridians program.
