= Bronson Cushing Skinner =

American businessman (1889–1981)

Bronson Cushing Skinner (1889 – 1981) was an American businessman. He developed a process to make concentrated orange juice and constructed a manufacturing plant in Dunedin, Florida. He operated Skinner Machinery Corp and his plant was built in the 1940s and burned in 1945. He rebuilt and soon after sold operations to Snow Corp and the business eventually became part of Minute Maid. Skinner also built Skinner's Skyport in Dunedin. He was the son of orange grove owner L.B. Skinner. He is listed as a Great Floridian.
