= Florida Today =

Newspaper in Melbourne, Florida

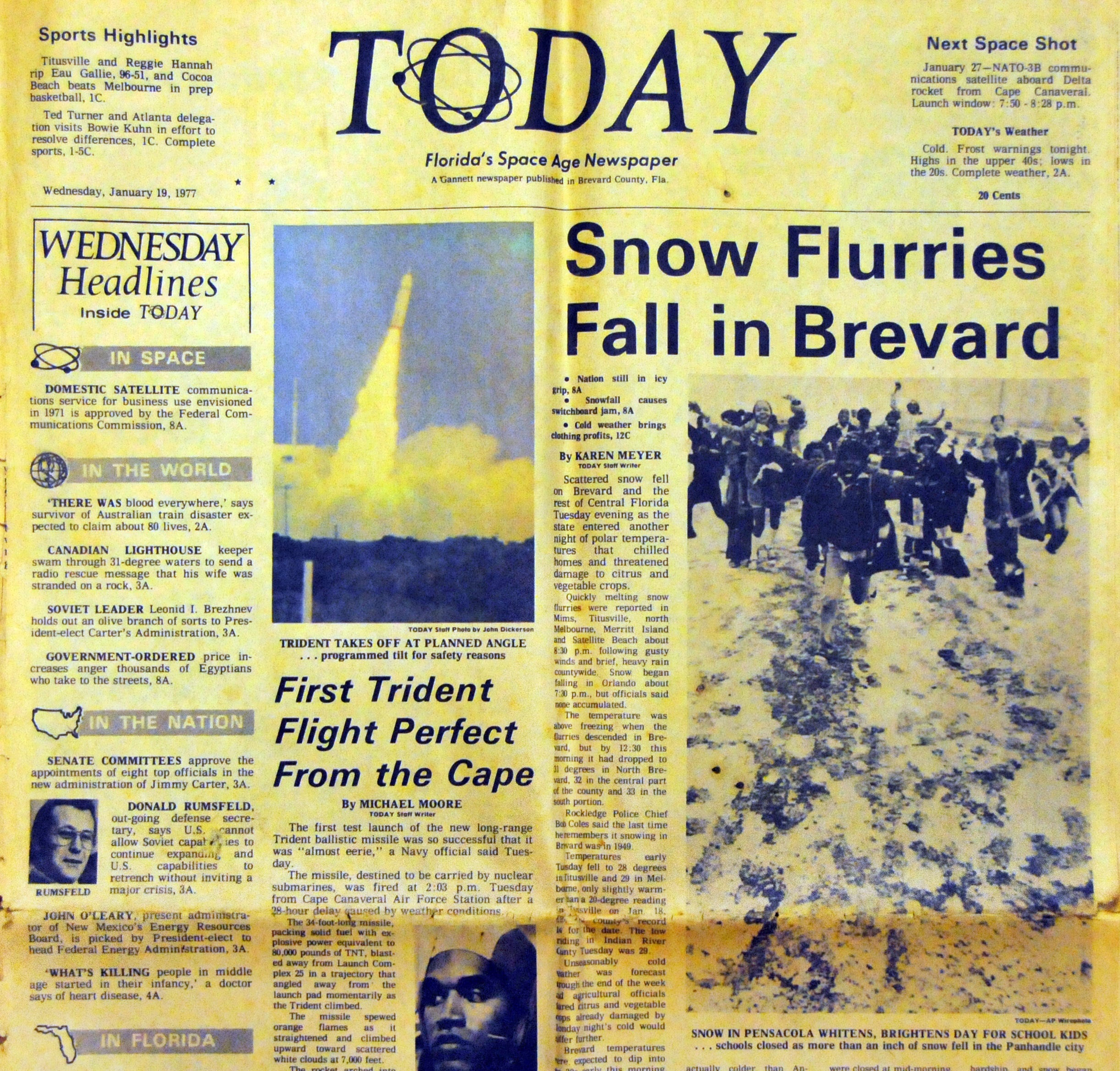
- Front page on January 19, 1977, after a rare snow in Florida
- Type: Daily newspaper
- Format: Broadsheet
- Owner: USA Today Co.
- Founder: Al Neuharth
- Editor: Mara Bellaby
- Founded: 1966 in Cocoa, Florida
- Headquarters: 1005 Viera Blvd. Viera, Florida 32955
- Circulation: 8,479 Average print circulation 2,202 Digital Subscribers
- ISSN: 1051-8304
- Website: floridatoday.com

Logo in 2012

Florida Today is the major daily newspaper serving Brevard County, Florida. Al Neuharth of the Gannett corporation started the paper in 1966, and some of the things he did with this newspaper presaged what he would later do at USA Today.

In addition to its regular daily publication, Florida Today publishes three weekly community newspapers that are tailored for the North, South, and Central areas within Brevard County. Average daily circulation ($1.25/issue) of the main publication is 54,021, with Sunday circulation ($3.50/issue) 89,328 (2013). Circulation of the paper tends to be higher in the winter (due to snowbirds), lower in summer.

== History ==
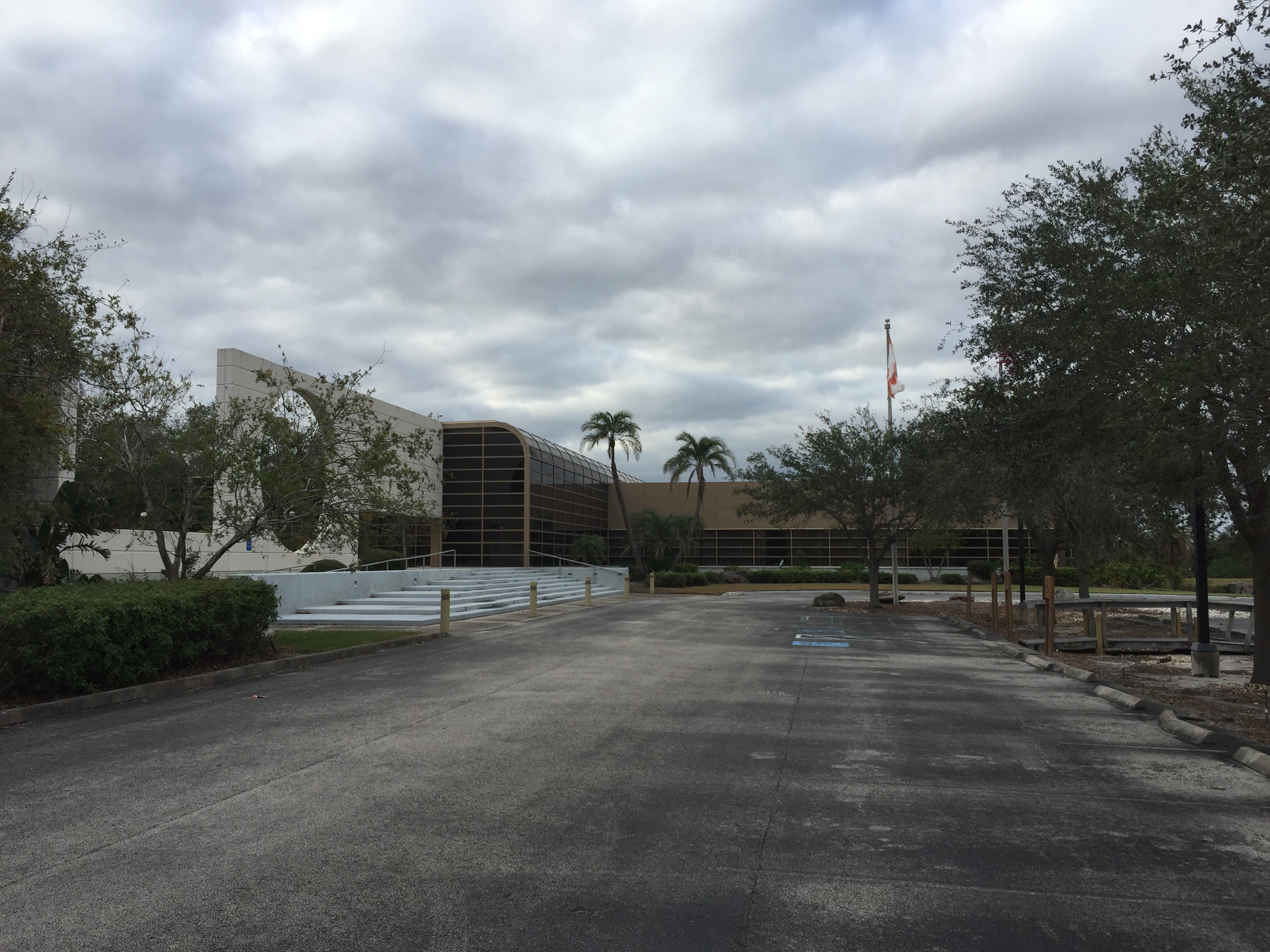
Gannett Building in Rockledge, Florida

Gannett's Florida Today, initially simply TODAY, was built at the Cocoa Tribune, to compete with the regional and dominant Orlando Sentinel and the statewide Miami Herald. When Gannett (Gannett Florida) purchased the Cocoa newspaper from Marie Holderman in 1965, it also acquired the Titusville Star-Advocate in the county seat to the north, and the tabloid weekly Eau Gallie Courier, the latter published from the Cocoa facility. They acquired the Melbourne Daily Times in 1970.

To guarantee advertisers a minimum circulation, Gannett delivered papers at no cost to all residences in Brevard County for the first two weeks of the newspaper's life; publication began on March 21, 1966. It continued this free circulation promotion to specific parts of the county until its circulation met the minimum set for the advertisers.

=== Teen section ===
A teen section The Verge was "by, for, and about teens." The section was composed by 40 students, as long as they were under 20 (most were in local high schools, but a few attended the local Brevard Community College). The section had regular articles in rotation such as Generation Gaps, where teens and someone from an earlier generation (parent, teacher, coach, etc.) wrote opposing views to a topic. The section began expanding into other parts of the paper and throughout the week. It was originally published on the back of Sunday's People section.

At a 2006 conference, The Verge won two national awards: First and Second Place for Best News Story. In May 2007, it was announced that The Verge would be integrated with the paper, rather than have its own section.

== Recognition ==
The paper was cited in 2003, 2004, 2005, 2006, 2007, and 2009 as a Gold Medal Newspaper for overall excellence by Gannett Co.

== Editors ==
- G.E. “Buddy” Baker (1978–1986)
- Terry Eberle (2002–2008)
- Bob Stover (2008–2014)
- Bob Gabordi (2015–2019)
- Mara Bellaby (since March 2019)

== Notable employees ==
- Jeff Parker (editorial cartoonist)
