= Sarah D. McKay =

American teacher and philanthropist (1884–1970)

- Born: Sarah Jeannette Dukes; July 24, 1926; Lakeland, Florida, US
- Died: September 17, 2024 (aged 98); Lakeland, Florida, US
- Other name: "Uppie"
- Education: Wesleyan Conservatory
- Occupations: businesswoman & Philanthropist
- Employer: McKay Enterprises
- Known for: cultural, civic and educational initiatives
- Title: Honorary Doctor of Public Service
- Political party: Democratic
- Spouse(s): Littleton Kirk McKay, Jr. (m. 1951)
- Children: Paula, Mona & Kirk, III
- Parents: Benjamin Hill Dukes (father); Carrie Missouri Dekle (mother)

Sarah D. McKay (January 24, 1926 – September 17, 2024) was a global traveler, philanthropist and Great Floridian whose record of community service was long and distinguished.

== Early years ==
Sarah McKay was born on January 24, 1926, in Lakeland, Polk County, Florida to Carrie and Benjamin Dukes, a hardware merchant. She was the last of six children and grew up in Lakeland during the Great Depression. Her first job in high school was working the front counter at a dry-cleaning business. She was in the class of 1944 at Lakeland High School.

== Wesleyan ==
A recruiter from Wesleyan Conservatory (now Wesleyan College) in Macon, Georgia, spoke at a class at McKay's high school. She wanted to enroll but knew her father would require persuasion, so she asked the Wesleyan representative to dine with her family to assist. Her parents agreed, but the expenses of room, board and tuition required a work-study scholarship. Her three sisters helped with expenses. In 1944, the independent young woman rode on a bus 370 miles to school. McKay chose a two-year program training as an executive secretary. After graduation in 1946, she returned home, taking a job at a bank.

== Marriage ==
Sarah first met Kirk McKay, Jr. when she was in elementary school. Her family attended College Heights Methodist Church and in Sunday school she met a smart and energetic young man who became her friend. That friendship expanded into a marriage lasting 48 years. The McKay family owned a furniture store in downtown Lakeland and Kirk worked there. A store employee was assigned to take the store's deposits to People's Bank. When Kirk McKay learned that Sarah Dukes worked as a teller, he assumed that responsibility. Sarah enrolled at Wesleyan and while home during a school break in 1946, Kirk invited her on a picnic where he proposed. Her response was, "Yes, I'll do that." She was 20 years old but told Kirk to ask for her parents' permission. Instead, he convinced her to elope with him to Havana. After a civil service there, they were married in Mexico City at a Methodist church. Thus began the McKays' global travels, which took them to all seven continents. Following the death of her husband Kirk in 1994, Sarah immersed herself in the family's business and also that of Lakeland. When she assumed control of McKay Enterprises as president, she surprised some people with her knowledge of business, bookkeeping and investments. In real estate, development and construction, she was able to do more than just "hold her own in the business community". McKay also continued to travel with family and friends.

== Travel ==
The McKays engaged in what is now considered Adventure travel. Mrs. McKay would follow her husband anywhere as long as she wasn't forced to "sleep on the ground". Sixty years ago, travel could be difficult, and accommodations were sometimes rough. The couple trekked to Kathmandu with Sherpas, viewed Egyptian pyramids, journeyed to Peru and explored Inca ruins. They rode the Orient Express in Asia and visited jungles of Central America. Antarctica was their destination in the 1990s. While in her 70s, McKay toured Greenland, the Arctic and traced a route taken by Vikings. Japan was another trip. At age 94 McKay was asked about unchecked bucket list items. She stated that she wanted to go dog-sledding. Her daughter did some research on the internet and located a company that could safely accommodate her elderly mother. They enjoyed their trip. Her final travel was to New York City at age 96 to help her granddaughter pick out a wedding dress.

== Projects and leadership ==
- McKay supported the idea of friend Rhea Chiles who opened Florida House, a 19th century home in Washington, D.C. that functions as a state embassy for residents of Florida. The facility is close to the Capital building and is funded by private donations. McKay was a trustee until her death.
- She was a key contributor for the Munn Park restoration in the 1980s. The fountain there was donated by the McKays.
- Lake Mirror Promenade Renovation
- McKay was chairman of the board at Lakeland General Hospital, renamed Lakeland Regional Health
- McKay served as president of the Lakeland Junior Welfare League (now Junior League of Greater Lakeland) from 1964-65.
- Paula Dockery received the 2021 Sarah Dukes McKay Leadership Award bestowed by the Junior League of Greater Lakeland
- An annual award, Advocate of the Year is given in her honor by Lakeland Regional Health

== Florida Southern College ==
McKay was one of the first women to serve on the Board of Trustees at Florida Southern College and served since 1996. Her appointments include Board Secretary and membership on the Trusteeship and Executive Committees. She was elected Chairperson in 2003, and she played a crucial role in completing their strategic plan. She was honored with a 2005 honorary doctorate of public service. She also endowed the Dr. Sarah D. and L. Kirk McKay Jr. Endowed Chair for American History, Government, and Civics. presently held by Professor Bruce Anderson, teacher and columnist for Lakeland Ledger newspaper.

=== Archive ===
McKay's gift enabled the construction of the McKay Archives Center on campus. The Sarah D. and L. Kirk McKay, Jr. Archives Center was opened during February 2009. It is a repository to preserve history and collect, organize, preserve, and describe the records and institutional history of the school. Also housed are the historic documents of the Lawton Chiles Center for Florida History, the Florida Citrus Archives and the Florida Conference of the United Methodist Church.

=== Museum ===
McKay helped start the Polk Museum of Art in 1966 and remained involved until her death. It began as a museum for children featuring live animals. It was renamed the Ashley Gibson Barnett Museum of Art, located at Florida Southern College. The museum is now a Smithsonian affiliate institution.

== Awards ==
- Stanley S. Kresge Award by the United Methodist Higher Education Foundation for Florida Southern support in 2009.
- Polk Pioneer award from the Polk County Historical Association.
- Legacy Award from the Community Foundation of Greater Lakeland
- Harrison-Hooks Lifetime Achievement Award honored by the Polk Museum of Art in 2005.
- George Jenkins Award the Lakeland Chamber of Commerce bestows this for outstanding community contributions. In 2007 McKay was the first woman honored.
- Alexis de Tocqueville designation from United Way of Central Florida.
- Great Floridians Award presented in 2010

== Personal ==
Her family and friends were important to her, but she treated everyone with kindness and consideration. McKay was an avid reader and book club member. She enjoyed playing bridge and socializing with her friends. For her business, she relied on a Professional employer organization.
