= Joseph Wesley Young House =

Historic house in Florida, United States

- U.S. National Register of Historic Places
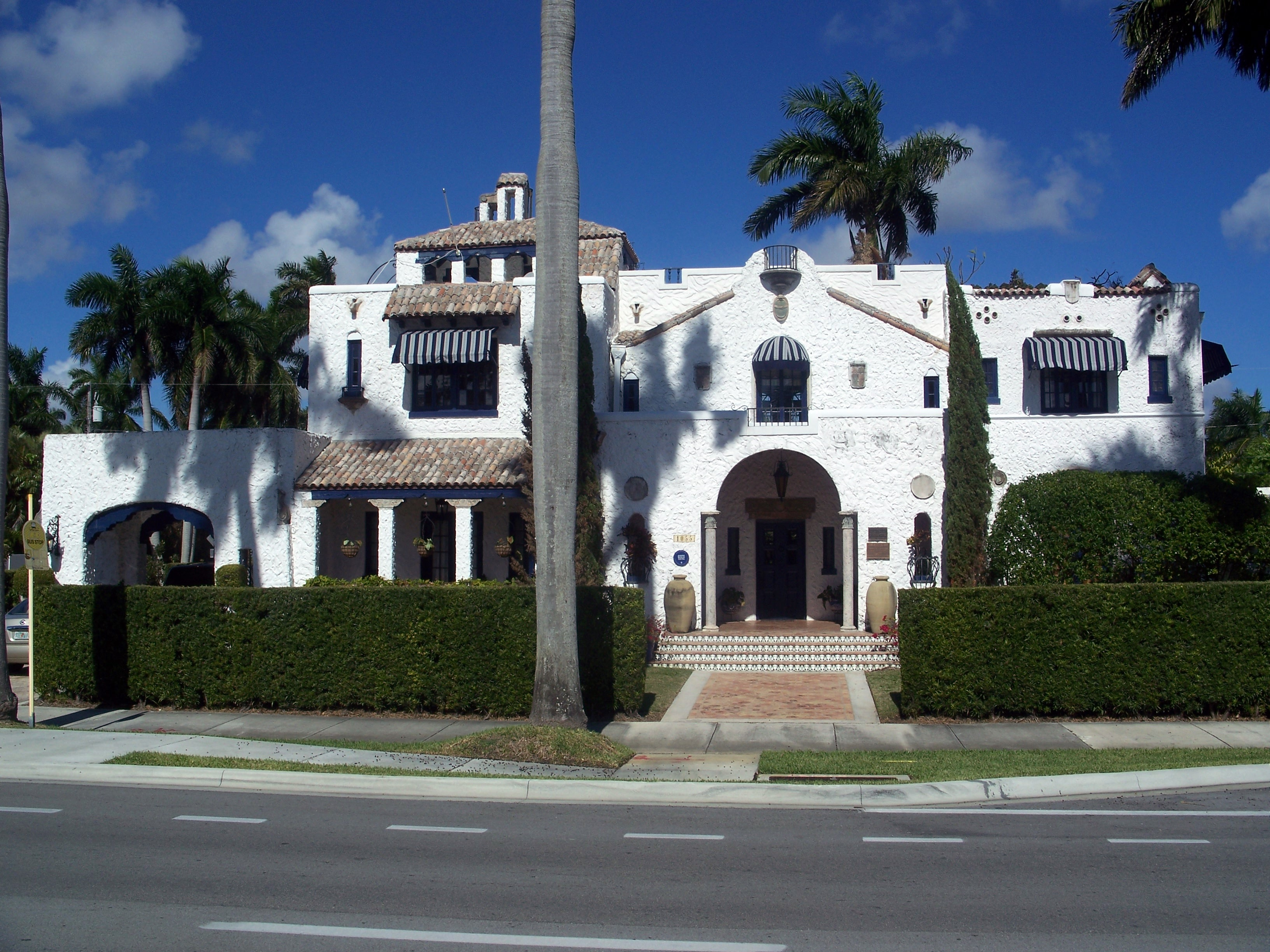

- Location within Florida Location within the United States
- Location: Hollywood, Florida
- Coordinates: 26°00′44″N 80°07′40″W
- Architectural style: Mission/Spanish Revival
- NRHP reference No.: 89001076
- Added to NRHP: 10 August 1989

The Joseph Wesley Young House is a historic home in Hollywood, Florida. It is located at 1055 Hollywood Boulevard. It was built in 1925 and designed by the architectural firm of Rubush and Hunter. On August 10, 1989, it was added to the U.S. National Register of Historic Places. Joseph Wesley Young Jr. (1882–1934) was a founder and developer of Hollywood, Florida. He is listed as a Great Floridian.

The house is described as looking like a "Moorish castle with two-dozen rooms". One of the "most venerable and storied mansions in Broward County", it was for sale in 2008.

== Joseph Wesley Young ==
Young was a real estate developer in Long Beach, California. He was born in San Francisco. He married Jessie Fay (Cooke) Young (1877–1955), a piano player and singer, in 1902. Although she was five years older than him, her lovely voice and personality captured his fancy when he moved to Long Beach in 1902.

In 1914, a huge flood in Long Beach wiped out the property Young was developing.

He was Hollywood, Florida's first mayor in 1925 and helped rebuild the city after a hurricane devastated it in 1926. His marketing helped bring Robert Anderson to the area. His Great Floridian plaque is at the Joseph W. Young house at 1055 Hollywood Blvd.

After the end of the 1920s boom in Florida real estate, he worked on developing Old Forge, in New York. He died of a heart attack on February 26, 1934, in Hollywood, Florida.

== Sources ==
- "Joseph W. Young". The New York Times. February 27, 1934. p. 19.
