= Josie Rogers =

First Female Physician and Mayor of a Florida City

Josie Rogers was an American physician and politician. She was the first female physician in Daytona Beach and the first woman to be elected mayor of a city in Florida in 1922, only two years after women gained the right to vote in elections in the state. Known as Dr. Josie, she practiced medicine for 50 years, serving both black and white residents of her lifelong hometown. She was related to Clemence Lozier, another pioneering female physician and suffragette, who was the cousin of her great-grandmother.

== Personal life ==
Born in 1876 to David and Julia Rogers, Rogers lived her entire life - except for her years in university and medical training - in Daytona Beach, Florida, which was incorporated as a city the year that she was born. Following her graduations from Alfred University in Alfred, New York and Hahnemann Medical School in Chicago, the young Rogers returned to Daytona Beach and became actively engaged with the community. Rogers was a suffragette, helping to organize the area's League of Women Voters and the Palmetto Club, a woman's club still active to this day. The majority of her accomplishments revolve around the health of individuals in her community. Rogers never married, nor did she ever move out of her childhood home. She lived and practiced medicine in the home that her father had built in 1879 until her death in 1975 at the age on 98. Her home, located between the Intercoastal Waterway and Beach Street in Daytona Beach was designated a National Historic Landmark in 1986.

== Public life ==
Josie Rogers began her career in 1912 with her statewide posting to chair Florida's Department of Health. She became chief of staff at the Halifax District Hospital. Rogers also worked to place nurses in every school in Volusia County. In 1919, she started a program to provide health exams to all school children. Three years later, Rogers formed the first Negro Welfare Association, and two years after that, formed the city's first Recreation Board. She helped to organize Daytona's YMCA and acted as director of the Halifax Historical Association.

In 1925, Rogers attended the International Conference on Child Welfare in Geneva, Switzerland. The Conference inspired the creation of International Children's Day.

== See also ==
- Rogers House (Daytona Beach, Florida)
