= Rogers House (Daytona Beach, Florida) =

Historic house in Florida, United States

- U.S. National Register of Historic Places
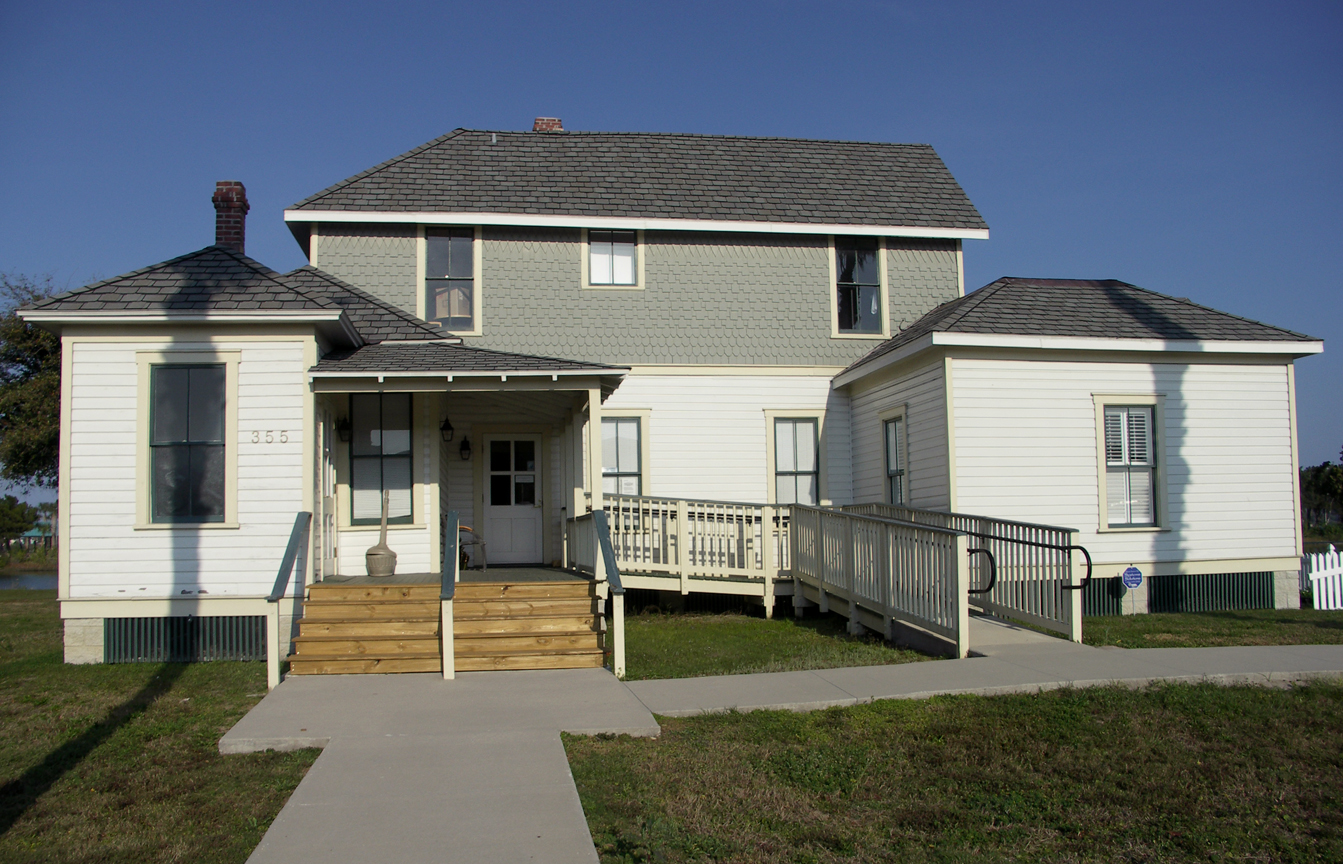

- Location within Volusia County
- Location: 436 N. Beach St., Daytona Beach, Florida
- Coordinates: 29°13′9″N 81°0′50″W
- Built: 1878
- Architect: Rogers, D.D.
- Architectural style: Queen Anne
- NRHP reference No.: 86002407
- Added to NRHP: September 11, 1986

The Rogers House is a historic home in Daytona Beach, Florida, United States. It is located at 436 North Beach Street. On September 11, 1986, it was added to the U.S. National Register of Historic Places.

== References and external links ==
- Volusia County listings at National Register of Historic Places
- Florida's Office of Cultural and Historical Programs
  - Volusia County listings
  - Rogers House
  - Great Floridians of Daytona Beach
