= Theophilus West House =

Historic house in Florida, United States

- U.S. National Register of Historic Places
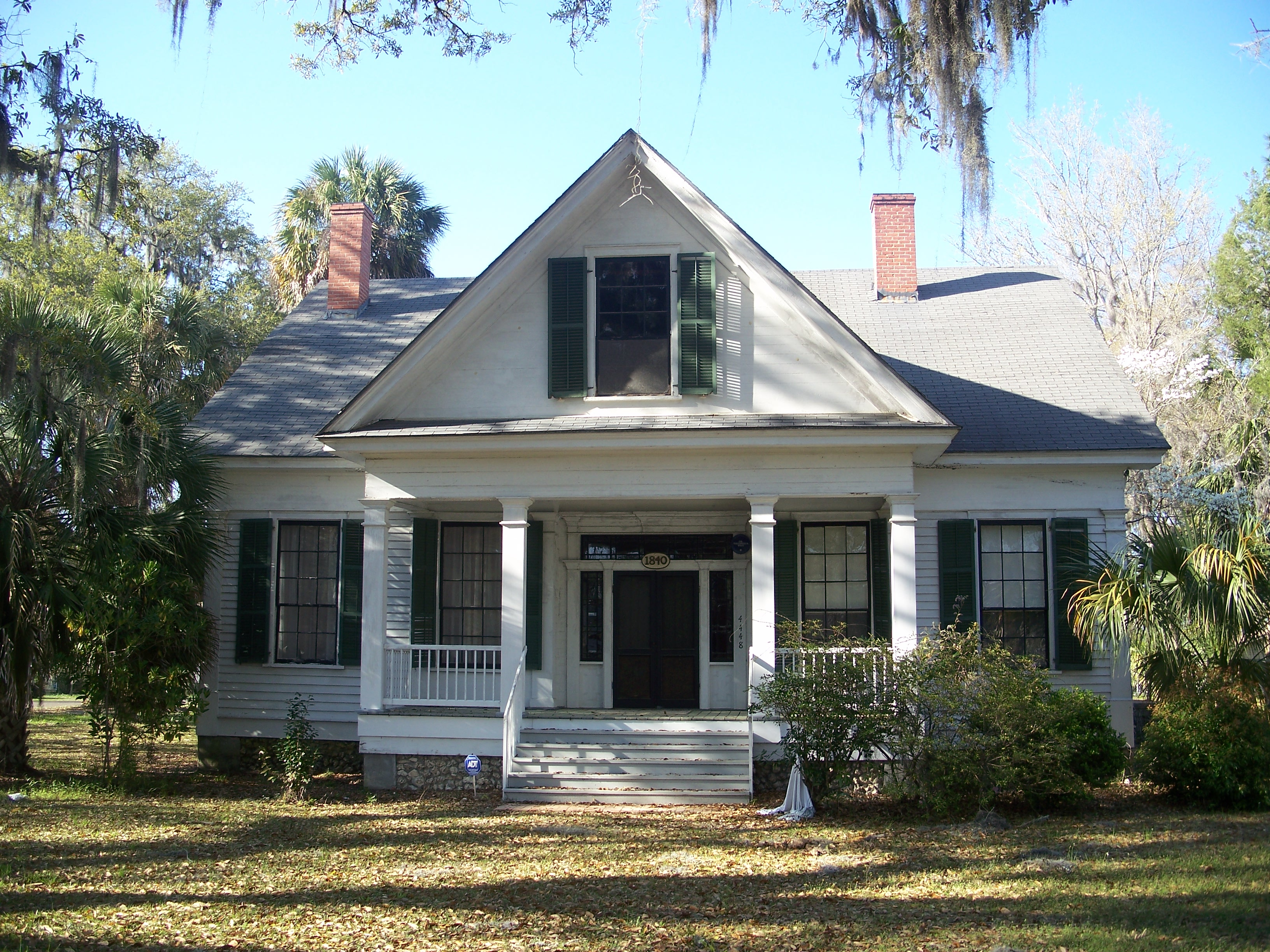

- Location within Florida Location within the United States
- Location: Marianna, Florida
- Coordinates: 30°46′43″N 85°13′32″W
- Architectural style: Greek Revival
- NRHP reference No.: 72000328
- Added to NRHP: December 26, 1972

The Theophilus West House (also known as the Slade West House) is a historic site in Marianna, Florida. On December 26, 1972, it was added to the U.S. National Register of Historic Places.
