= Forrey Building and Annex =

- U.S. National Register of Historic Places
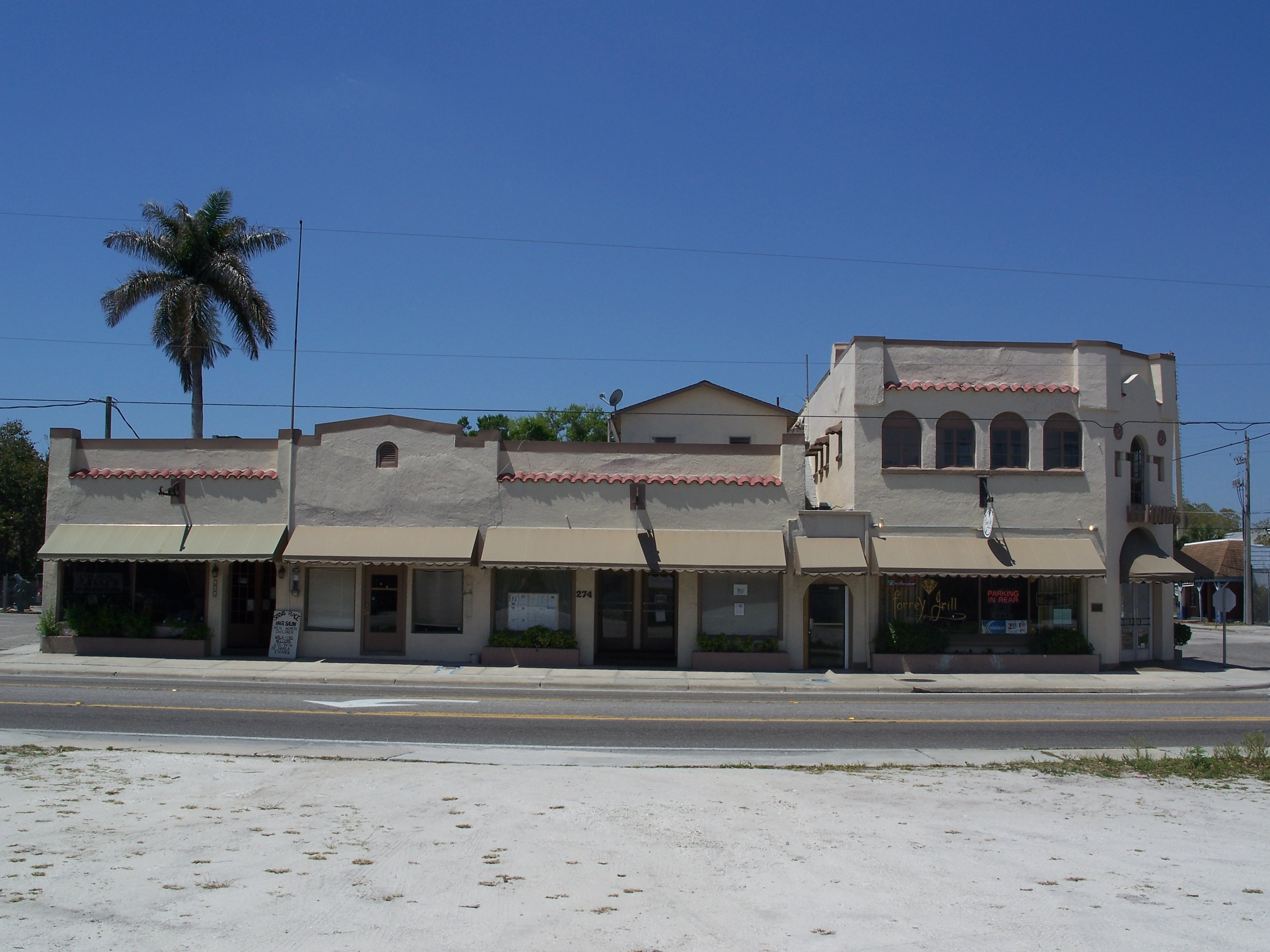

- Location within Florida Location within the United States
- Location: LaBelle, Florida
- Coordinates: 26°45′56″N 81°26′16″W
- Architectural style: Mission/Spanish Revival
- NRHP reference No.: 95000914
- Added to NRHP: July 28, 1995

The Forrey Building and Annex is a historic site in LaBelle, Florida. It is located at 264 through 282 Bridge Street. On July 28, 1995, it was added to the U.S. National Register of Historic Places.
