= Marie Selby =

American philanthropist (1885–1971)

Marie Selby (August 9, 1885 – 1971) was an American philanthropist known for her support of various arts and cultural centers. Most notably, the world-renowned Marie Selby Botanical Gardens were named after her which was founded in 1973 when she bequeathed her former home and 15-acre property "for the enjoyment of the general public."

== Early life ==
Born Mariah Minshall in Wood County, West Virginia on August 9, 1885, her family moved to Marietta, Ohio where her father studied geology at Marietta College, focusing on oil drilling equipment and inventions for improvement in the industry. The family took advantage of being close to the Ohio River, exploring the wilderness on camping and hiking trips.

Selby attended a music seminary in Illinois as an accomplished pianist.

Throughout the 1910s, the couple spent their winters in Sarasota, staying at the Belle Haven Inn, Chapline Cottages on Palm Avenue, and sometimes in a houseboat at the end of Main Street. The Selbys made Sarasota their permanent home in 1921 when they purchased land on the Sarasota Bay and Hudson Bayou. This land would eventually become Marie Selby Botanical Gardens. They built a modest, two-story stucco house intended to be temporary, but decided to make it their permanent home.

== Career ==
On May 6, 1927, the Sarasota Garden Club was established. Selby was a founding member as part of the Founder's Circle, as the natural south Florida environment helped support her interest in horticulture. She had a passion for gardening and nature, and wanted to preserve the green spaces that made Sarasota special. She eventually planted a row of bamboo to hide her view of surrounding condominiums.

The Selbys joined the Sarasota Yacht Club and hosted local members and visitors for the annual Regatta in 1928. Selby won the "Express Cruiser Race" in Bilma Junior, "Bilma" being a combination of Bill and Marie.

== Legacy ==
Selby died in 1971 at the age of 86, leaving her property and $2 million as an endowment for the development of a botanical garden. The Downtown Campus is dedicated to the display and study of epiphytic orchids, bromeliads, gesneriads and ferns - “the only botanical garden in the world” with this focus. It has now grown to a 45-acre site, with the addition of the 30-acre Historic Spanish Point campus in Osprey on May 1, 2020.

The William G. & Marie Selby Foundation began as a charitable trust of $3 million. According to their website, they gifted over $120 million to individuals and organizations, contributing $3 million a year for scholarships and local community grants. Selby remained active at the Foundation after her husband's death, often matching grants and encouraging giving.

She became one of the first women to cross the country by car, after being inspired by the country's first cross-country automobile race. Selby and her husband completed the trip from Seattle to New York City in six days less than the winning car.

== Personal life ==
Selby married William (Bill) Selby on January 31, 1908, in the First Presbyterian Church of Marietta. Bill Selby was a partner at his father's business, Selby Oil and Gas Company, which merged with the Texas Company in the 1940s to become Texaco. Selby and her husband did not have children of their own during their forty-eight year marriage, but were "concerned about young people" and used their money to help future generations through the William G. & Marie Selby Foundation established in 1955, one year prior to Bill's death.
