= Great Floridians =

Florida citizen title

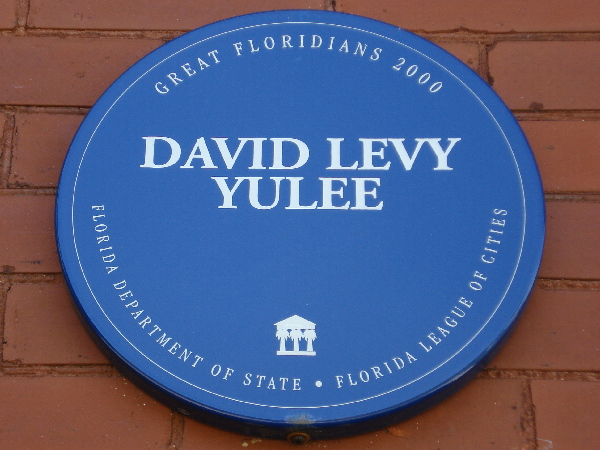
Typical Great Floridians 2000 panel, similar to the blue plaques of London

Great Floridian is a title bestowed on citizens of Florida by the Florida Department of State. There were actually two formal programs. The Great Floridian 2000 program honored deceased individuals who made "significant contributions in the history and culture" of Florida (many times within a local community), the new program is more restrictive by selecting persons, dead or alive, who made "major contributions to the progress and welfare" of Florida.

== Great Floridians 2000 ==
The Florida Department of State and the Florida League of Cities created the program in 1998, and it ran to 2000. The process bestowed commemorative blue plaques in Florida to honor deceased individuals who significantly contributed to Florida, similar to blue plaques found in the United Kingdom. A total of 385 persons were so honored. The historians on the Great Floridians 2000 Committee approved or rejected applications, which included a section for specifying an appropriate historical property on which the marker would be mounted.

== Great Floridians Program ==
In 2007, the legislature resurrected, revised, and formalized the program. It has been codified in the Florida Statutes:

267.0731 Great Floridians Program.--The division (Florida Department of State) shall establish and administer a program, to be entitled the Great Floridians Program, which shall be designed to recognize and record the achievements of Floridians, living and deceased, who have made major contributions to the progress and welfare of this state.

Under the Statute, each year at least two people who have had an outstanding impact on Florida are nominated by an ad hoc committee of representatives of the Governor, each member of the Florida Cabinet, the President of the Senate, the Speaker of the House of Representatives, and the Director of the Division of Historical Resources. Subsequently, the Secretary of State chooses among them.

Ten persons named in the new program were previously included in the Great Floridian 2000 program: Mary McLeod Bethune, Lawton M. Chiles, Henry Morrison Flagler, John Gorrie, Ben Hill Griffin, Jr., Spessard Holland, Zora Neale Hurston, May Mann Jennings, Dick Pope, Sr. and James Van Fleet.

As of 2013, 89 people had been honored.

=== Scott actions ===
On April 12, 2013, Governor Rick Scott presented Tim Tebow with the award at TPC at Sawgrass, just prior to Tebow's charity gala and golf tournament, attended by numerous celebrities and sports figures. Wayne Huizenga was similarly honored but with less fanfare. Less than two weeks later, 21 additional persons were named in a press release on the governor's webpage. Contrary to F.S. 267.0731, "Scott single-handedly chose most of the latest group," according to Tampa Bay Times.

== See also ==
- List of Great Floridians
- Goodwill Ambassador
- Arkansas Traveler
- Nebraska Admiral
- Order of the Long Leaf Pine (of North Carolina)
- Order of the Palmetto (of South Carolina)
- Kentucky Colonel
- Rhode Island Commodore
- Sagamore of the Wabash (of Indiana)
