= Coronel =

Coronel may refer to:

- Archaic and Spanish variant of colonel
- Coronel, Chile, a port city in Chile
- Battle of Coronel off the Chilean coast during World War I
- The World War II German auxiliary cruiser HSK Coronel, see German night fighter direction vessel Togo
- Coronelism, a Brazilian political machine during the Old Republic (1889–1930)

== People ==
- Antonio F. Coronel (1817–1894), mayor of Los Angeles from 1853 to 1854
- Christian Coronel (born 1980), professional basketball player in the Philippine Basketball Association
- Dannes Coronel (1973–2020), Ecuadorian footballer
- Emanuel Coronel (born 1997), Argentine professional footballer
- Feliciana Coronel (1964–1996), Paraguayan lesbian rights activist
- Felipe Coronel (born 1978), aka Immortal Technique, a Peruvian American rapper and political activist
- Gregorio Nuñez Coronel (~1548 ~ 1620), Portuguese Augustinian theologian, writer, and preacher
- Jorge Icaza Coronel (1906–1978), writer from Ecuador
- Juan Coronel (1569–1651), Spanish Franciscan missionary
- Luis Núñez Coronel / Ludovicus Coronel (c. 1480–c. 1531), Spanish clergyman, natural philosopher
- Mace Coronel (born 2004), American child actor
- Mateo Coronel (born 1998), Argentine professional footballer
- Maximiliano Coronel (born 1989), Argentine professional footballer
- Nachman Nathan Coronel (1810–1890), 19th century Jewish scholar
- Pablo de Coronel (1480–1534), Spanish Hebraist and professor of Hebrew
- Pastor Coronel (1929–2000), chief of the Investigations Department of Paraguay
- Pedro Coronel (1923–1985), Mexican abstract painter, sculptor, draughtsman, and engraver
- Rafael Coronel (born 1931), artist and painter from Mexico
- Rocco Coronel (born 2010), Dutch racing driver
- Coronel (footballer) (born 1935), Antônio Evanil da Silva, Brazilian footballer
- Sheila Coronel, winner of the 2003 Magsaysay Award for Journalism
- Stephen Coronel (born 1951), guitarist
- Tim Coronel (born 1972), Dutch auto racing driver and twin brother of Tom
- Tom Coronel (born 1972), Dutch auto racing driver and twin brother of Tim
- Uri Coronel (1946–2016), Dutch sports director (AFC Ajax)

== See also ==
- Colonel (disambiguation)
- The Colonel (disambiguation)
