= Kentucky Colonels (disambiguation) =

Kentucky Colonel is the highest title of honor bestowed by the Commonwealth of Kentucky.

Kentucky Colonel, Kentucky Colonels, or Kentucky Colonelcy may also refer to:

- Honorable Order of Kentucky Colonels or simply "Kentucky Colonels", the largest of the Kentucky colonel organizations
- "A Kentucky Colonel", an 1890 novel by Opie Read
  - The Kentucky Colonel, a 1920s silent film based on the book
- Kentucky Colonels, an American basketball team from 1967 to 1976
- Kentucky Colonels (ABA 2000), an American basketball team from 2004 to 2006
- Kentucky Colonels (band), a Bluegrass music group
- Eastern Kentucky Colonels, the college athletic teams of Eastern Kentucky University

== See also ==
- Colonel (disambiguation)
- Louisville Colonels (disambiguation)
- The Colonel (disambiguation)
