= Emergency Room (art) =

Art piece format by Thierry Geoffroy

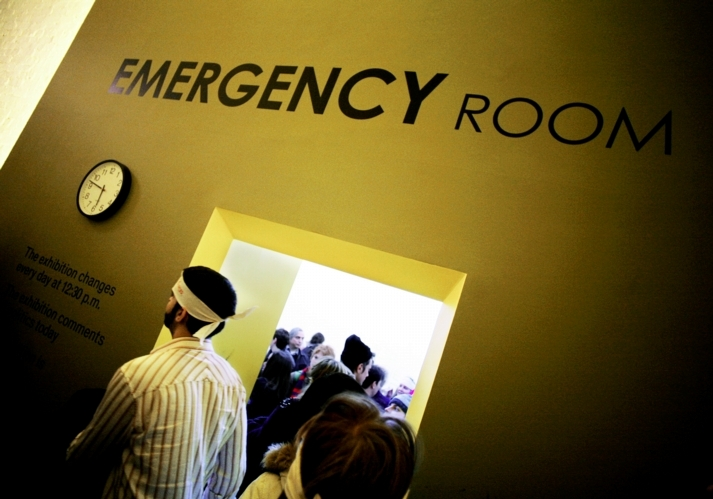
Emergency Room in MoMA PS1 2007

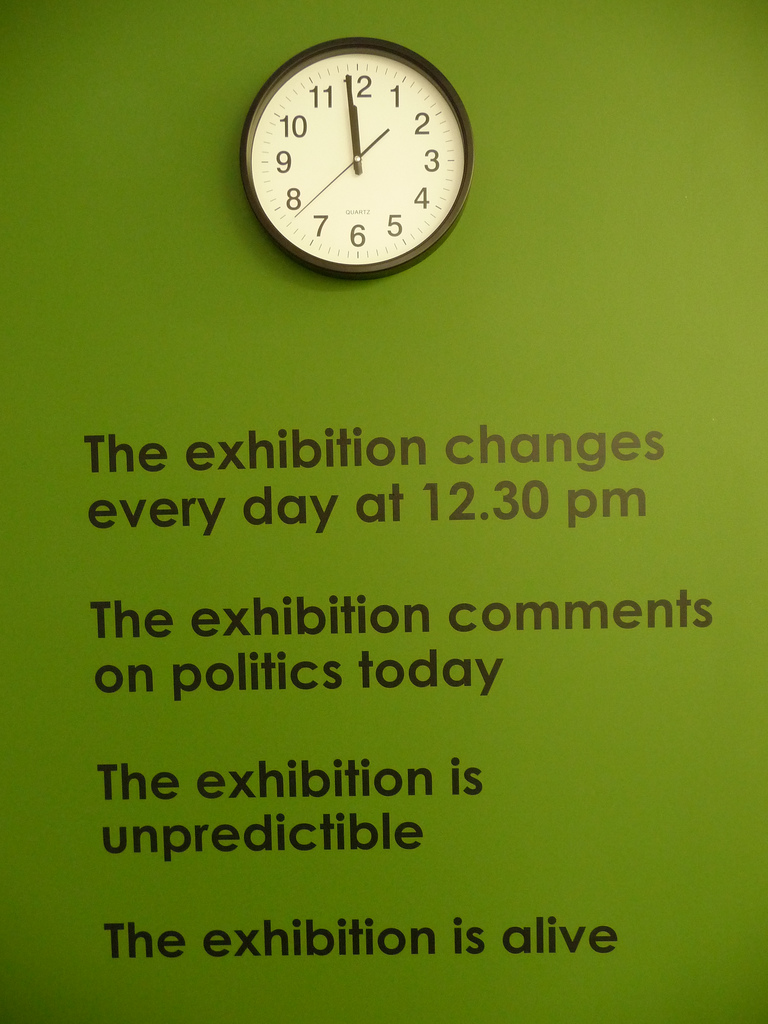
Emergency Room Entrance

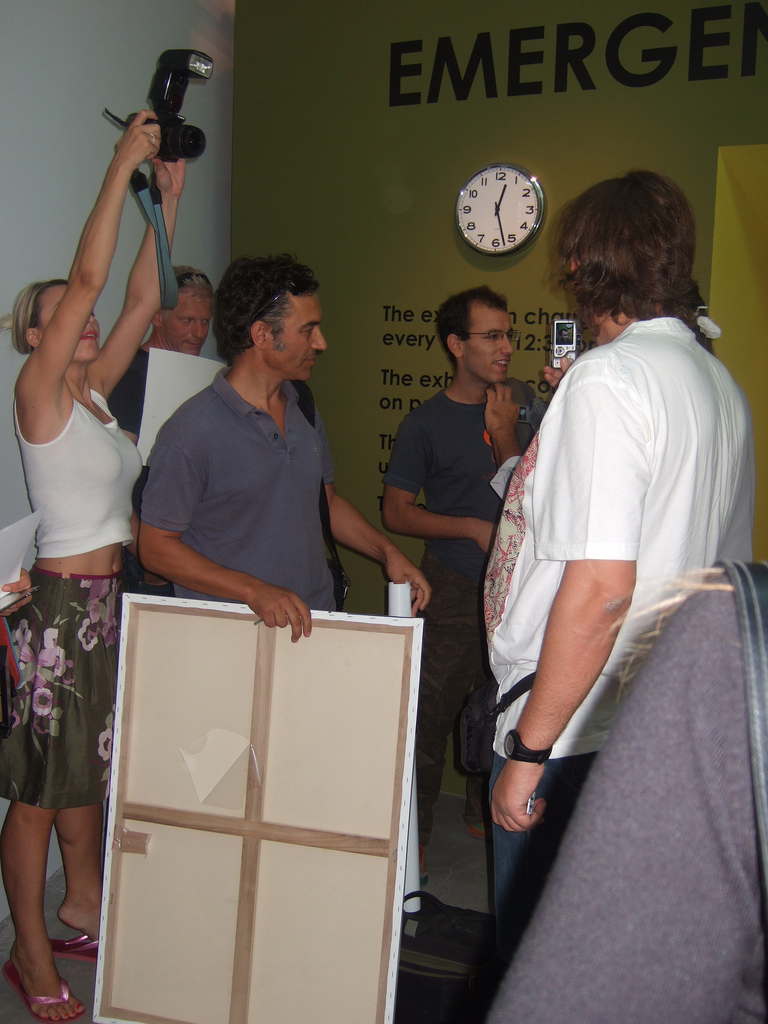
Emergency Room in Athens, 2007

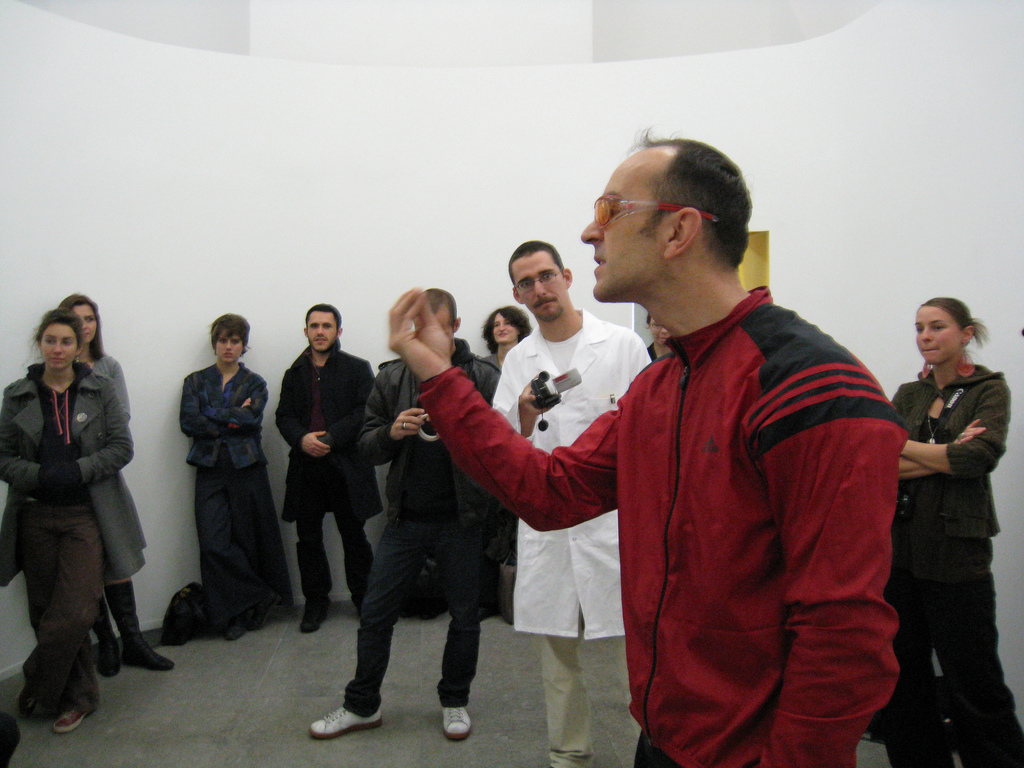
Participants debate after "The Passage"

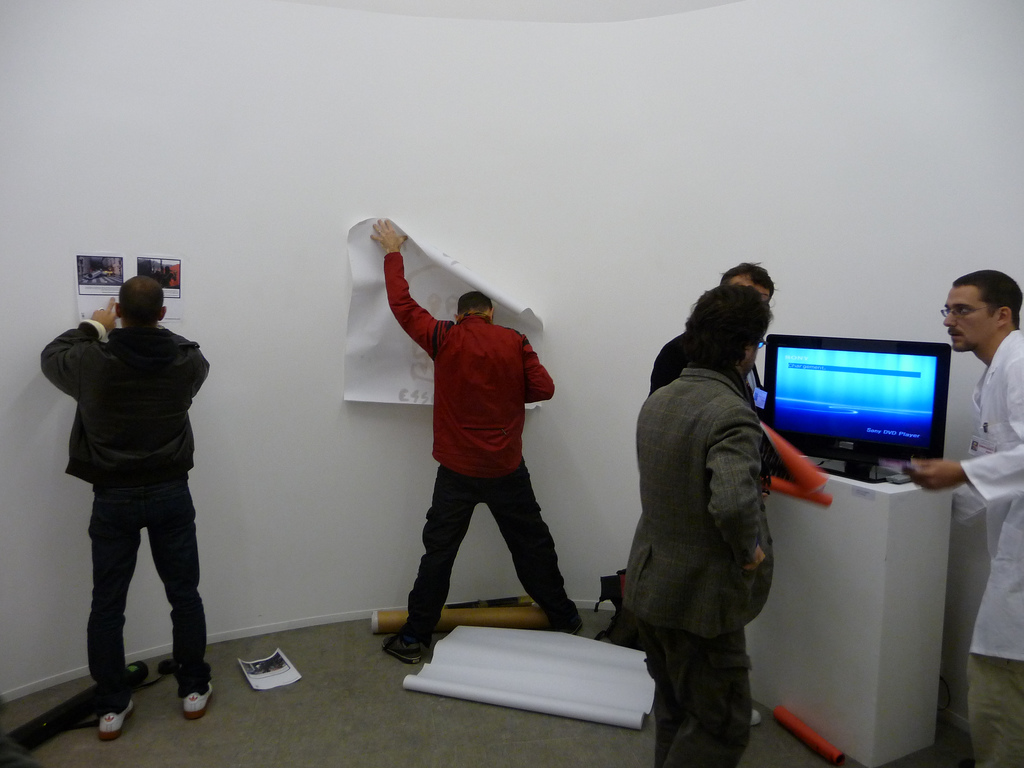
Emergency Room in Paris, 2008. "The Passage""

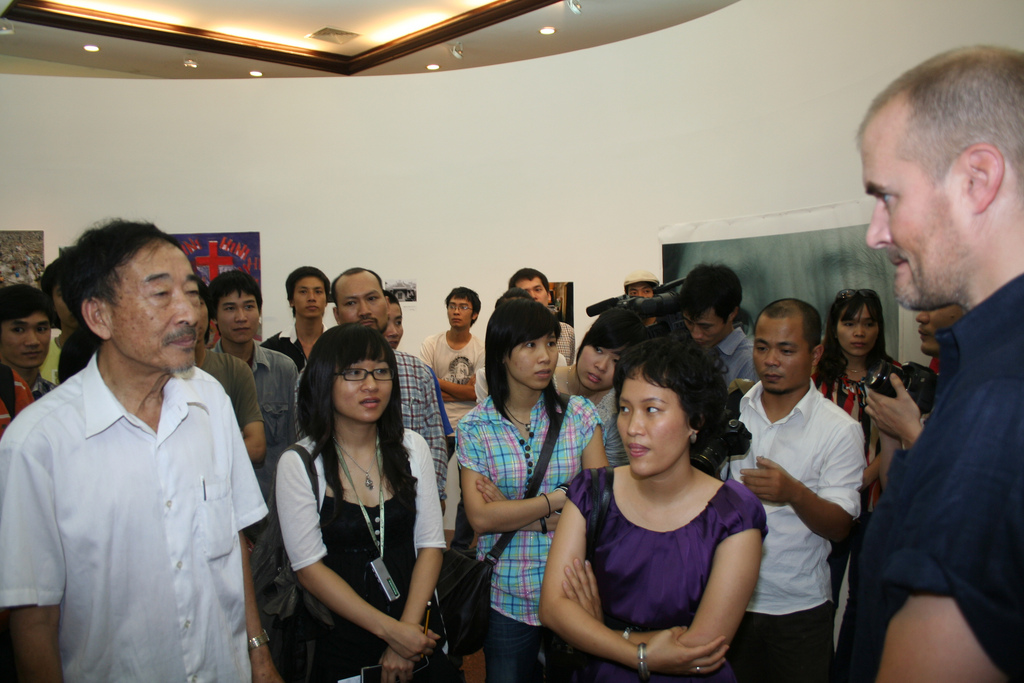
Emergency Room in Hanoi, 2009 - Debate after "The Passage"

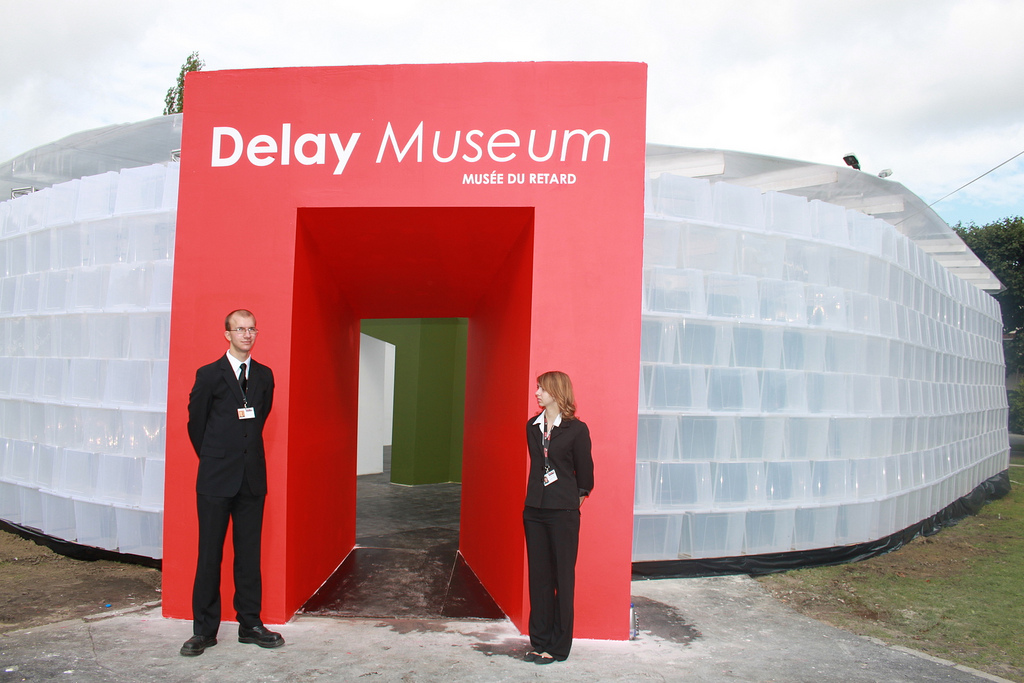
The Delay Museum, Poland 2011

Emergency Room is an art exhibition format devised by Thierry Geoffroy for artists with a desire to engage in current debates. Artists are invited to contribute with artworks that are produced daily in response to ongoing social issues, contributing to a constantly changing exhibition. The format avoids the need for an artist to wait months or years before being able to exhibit their art.

== Background ==
Thierry Geoffroy had been working on the idea of art in the 'now', the present moment, since 1988. Geoffroy had been working in a similar discipline to Emergency Room in his artistic ventures of the 1990s, particularly in an exhibition at the Copenhagen MM Museum in 1991, where he collected and exhibited daily newspaper articles and photographs detailing the crises transpiring in the world at that point in time, evidence of propaganda and satirical collages playing with brand logos. In 1992, Geoffroy appeared on Danish TV channel TV2 in a feature on his work, showing how he collected photographs from the news and other people and exhibited things the same day they were made. In Geoffroy's 1996 exhibition with artist Jeff Guess at the Moderna Museet Stockholm, they shot, produced and presented 10,000 city photographs in the space of a 10-day exhibiting period, aiming to detect social themes and identify issues through their photographs.

The basis of the Emergency Room format can be found in the Emergency Room Manifesto, published in email formatting, three years prior to the first exhibition in 2006. It was also published in part of the Documenta magazine Kunst.ee. In this work, he states the need for ‘Emergency Rooms’ where artists can exhibit their works on current issues every day, immediately.

A dictionary that acts as a sort of manifesto and guide to understanding the function and theory of Emergency Room was published as a supporting document to the 2007 MoMA PS1 Emergency Room in New York City.

== Emergency Room format ==
"Artists, audience and media have been fighting for weeks in order to get to see and participate in the new and innovating exhibition that with its "art of the news" puts the art institution itself to debate. Reuters, The New Yorker and the TV-channel ABC News are some of the leading media that have brought the story about the original exhibition, and at P.S.1 more than a thousand visitors per day have been seeing it…" said Danish newspaper Weekendavisen in March 2007.

Emergency Rooms are "carefully prepared environment[s] for hectic bursts of creation". Emergency Rooms can take place in several places across the world at the same time. When art institutions wish to host the Emergency Room format they are given a license to produce a version of the format.

The Emergency Room rules require the artwork of the previous day to be removed daily (12 or 12.30 p.m depending on the location) and replaced by fresh artwork. Geoffroy calls this central element of the process "The Passage". The number of artists turning up for the Passage will vary, sometimes with nobody showing up. Other days the news of the day will stimulate participation from the artists.

Emergency Room can be combined with the 'Delay Museum', a nearby exhibition space where yesterday's artwork is archived and shown. The (no longer contemporary) opinions and reactions are preserved. Geoffroy describes this as a critical way of thinking about contemporary art, with The Delay Museum becoming a place for studying the aesthetics of the fast moving 'emergency'.

Geoffroy describes the Emergency Room as a format where artists can "train their awareness muscle", encouraging experimentation and artistic daring.

=== Time & Precision ===
In order for the format to function well, punctuality must be kept by the artists and Geoffroy. The exhibition works on a 24-hour schedule, new artworks are presented each day at 12pm. Punctuality is integral to keep the flow of the exhibition moving and to ensure this tight schedule is kept to.

The strict time schedule of the exhibition is in place to stay as close to the present moment as possible. The exhibition aims to coincide with life itself, time is unstoppable, the exhibition must keep up with it. If the exhibition can keep up with time itself, there is the possibility of art being able to provoke action. Geoffroy sees the art world as lacking the ability as only able to comment on “yesterday’s world” and Emergency Room's time-based structure is an attempt to subvert this effect. In this is the idea of the artist being “in time”. There is a text on the outer walls of the Emergency Room structure that specifies the relationship to time and reinforces the time structure of the exhibition. An analog clock hangs on this wall as well, to help artists keep to the schedule and as a reference point for museum visitors to know when the exhibition is changing or when the artists will arrive. Geoffroy is often quoted using the phrase "Now before it is too late", in regards to the idea that issues need to be dealt directly with as soon as possible to have an effect before things can't be changed.

Precision is a primary concern of the Emergency Room as well as the Awareness Muscle format.

=== Debate ===
Part of the format includes debate; the artwork acts as a stimulant for debate on important themes. The debate spreads awareness and creates a sense of community in the format between participants. Everyone, artists, and visitors are involved in the debate. Debating facilitates the ability of the artworks to reach people and have an impact on current issues. The debate is described as “running/ streaming”, about its ongoing nature. Where the format has taken place in countries where censorship is state sponsored, Emergency Room can act as a way of opening up a dialogue, due to critique being more readily accepted through art.

=== Emergency Art ===
Emergency Room produces Emergency Art. Emergency art centres on topical issues, pressing events that are happening in the world at the moment of its creation. It is often concerned with political or controversial subjects. The structure of Emergency Room, with its strict time schedule, stimulates the ideal conditions for the creation of Emergency Art. The format often changes returning artists’ praxis, the exhibition's environment leading to more experimental, unpredictable artworks. Assessing the collection of artwork amassed from the format's many activations can be reviewed to define the aesthetic of emergency.

=== Vision ===
Thierry Geoffroy has expressed a vision for Emergency Room's development, a future where live broadcasting from the exhibition would fill a daily segment of the national TV news. This segment should be placed before the weather forecast, and be treated seriously, as a fundamental section of the news. On a longer timeline, this segment could be developed as a new genre of news reporting, becoming an integral fixture of daily broadcasting.

It is the artist's objective that every city should have a permanent Emergency Room so the format can be ongoing and uninterrupted. This permanent exhibition would operate as a watchdog for people to be critically engaged and informed on the world's emergencies.

Johanne Shroeder, quoting Morten Friis, wrote about Geoffroy's vision in contrast to relational aesthetics, "Rather Geoffroy's project is to eventually accomplish political and social transformation on a much bigger scale, for instance manifested in the implementation of permanent Emergency Rooms at every museum in the world. Geoffroy’s art formats, like relational art, also work on a small-scale level, but only in order to reach further out for maximum influence, ultimately reaching a bigger potential and wider audience."

== Convergence with other formats ==
Emergency Room often converges on or operates in parallel with other formats by Thierry Geoffroy, for example Biennalist or Critical Run. Emergency Room is a way to train the Awareness Muscle, a metaphorical muscle in Geoffroy's artistic oeuvre that compares building awareness to training a human muscle. The Awareness Muscle can be trained through “Discussing politics with others on a daily basis”, which is done in Emergency Room. The Delay Museum, which started as an extension of Emergency Room and has evolved independently of it, is the primary co-occurring piece and has been activated together with almost every rendition of the format.

=== Critical Run ===
Critical Run's are often organised throughout the Emergency Room exhibiting period. Critical Run took place during Emergency Room Wroclaw and through New York City during the MoMA exhibition. During the PAN Napoli Emergency Room exhibition, artists had to run and explain what they had brought that day for the exhibition, Critical Run's also took place through Napoli city.

=== Slow Dance Debate ===
Emergency Room is often accompanied by many activations of the Slow Dance Debate format. Slow Dance Debate is a format where participants slow dance with another person, preferably a stranger and debate an issue. These issues often converge with those brought up in Emergency Room.

=== Apathy Lab/ Academy of Emergency Art ===
Geoffroy has established facilitating formats that work to strengthen the aims of Emergency Room, namely “The Academy of Emergency Art” and “Apathy Lab”. The Academy of Emergency Art was co-orchestrated between Geoffroy and curator Tijana Miskovic. It is an educational format, seeking to transfer the logic of Emergency Room in an academic setting. It has taken place in the form of a 5-week course at the Kunst Højskole in Holbaek, Denmark. The format trains artists to work “in time” and to train their awareness muscle; this is to say that they can work with criticality and with the intention of creating art that can have an impact on emergencies. The format teaches courses on developing the ability to debate, examples of artists who have worked “in time” in art history, presentations and debate sessions on the function of the artist in society, as well as practical workshops, group presentations and individual studio visits. The Academy of Emergency Art received a lukewarm reception from Danish academics and art critics. The Apathy Lab is a “research initiative” formed of an amalgamation of projects that centre around the topic of apathy; where it comes from, why it is so widespread and how to “treat” it.

== Artists ==
The Emergency Room events involve large numbers of native and overseas artists. By November 2008 over 450 artists had been involved in the format in a number of locations internationally. The format has been described as "[taking] the pulse of the artistic community today" and "generating endless encounters of artists with the most contemporary events, public, media and each other’s work." To Thierry Geoffroy, there are artists that can be like thermometers, being able to detect dysfunctions in society and identify societal impairments and reasons for alarm. Emergency Room should enable an environment where art is on a more social level, the artist's role being to engage with pertinent topics that they have sensed in the social or political global climate. In Emergency Room, artists are seen as the nerve of the societal body, sensitive and interconnected. They are often more observant and better at communicating, therefore they are optimal for tackling issues directly and spearheading debates that can circumvent unraveling emergencies. The format can facilitate an artist's natural energy, working with the idea that artists are most able to create art when they have a space and a date to exhibit.

== Exhibitions ==
The format has been activated in:

- MoMA PS1, New York City (2007) involving 30 artists, changing the entire display at 12.30pm each day.
- University of Fine Arts, Hanoi, Vietnam (2009) involving 25 local and overseas artists. The event coincided with a Danish State visit to Hanoi in November 2009.
- European Culture Congress, Wroclav (2011), involving 18 artists.
- Naples: PAN - Palazzo delle Arti Napoli (2009).
- Athens: Ileana Tounta Contemporary Art Center (2007).
- Paris: Galerie Taiss (2008).
- Berlin: Galerie Olaf Stueber (2006).
- Copenhagen: Kunsthallen Nikolaj (2006).
