= Colonel (disambiguation) =

Colonel is a military rank.

Colonel may also refer to:

== Honorific title ==
- Colonel (U.S. honorary title), an honorary award of merit conferred by some states in the United States of America
- Kentucky Colonel, a civilian honorific title awarded by the Commonwealth of Kentucky used to recognize exemplary action(s) or activities of an individual
- Colonel, customary recognition for a US auctioneer who has completed auctioneer school
- Colonel-in-chief, an honorary title of British and Commonwealth Regiments, often bestowed on members of the Royal Family

== People ==
- Colonel Abrams, American singer, musician, songwriter, dancer, and actor
- Colonel Sanders, American businessman, founder of Kentucky Fried Chicken
- Thierry Geoffroy, French-Danish conceptual and format art artist known as "Colonel"

== Other uses ==
- Colonel (card game), a two-player American card game originally from Mexico
- Colonels Mountain (New Brunswick), a mountain in Canada
- Colonel, a 2000 Rick Shelley science fiction novel
- "Colonel Bogey March", a march written in 1914 by Lieutenant F. J. Ricketts

== See also ==
- Colonel By Drive, scenic parkway in Ottawa, Ontario, Canada
- Colonel general
- The Colonel (disambiguation)
- Kernel (disambiguation)
- Coronel (disambiguation)
