= Diego López de Cogolludo =

Spanish Franciscan historian (1613–1665)

- Born: 1613
- Died: 1665 (aged 51–52)
- Occupation: Historian

Diego López de Cogolludo (Alcalá de Henares 1613 – New Spain 1665) was a Spanish Franciscan historian of Yucatán.

== Biography ==
A native of Alcalá de Henares in Spain, he took the habit of St. Francis at the convent of San Diego, on 31 March 1629, and emigrated to Yucatán, where he became successively lector in theology, guardian, and finally provincial of his order.

His work, the Historia de Yucatán, appeared at Madrid in 1688, and was reprinted in 1842 and 1867. It contains information personally gathered at a time when older sources, written and oral, that have now partly disappeared, were still accessible. Cogolludo consulted and used the writings of Bishop Diego de Landa to a considerable extent, but many of his statements must be taken with caution.

== Works ==
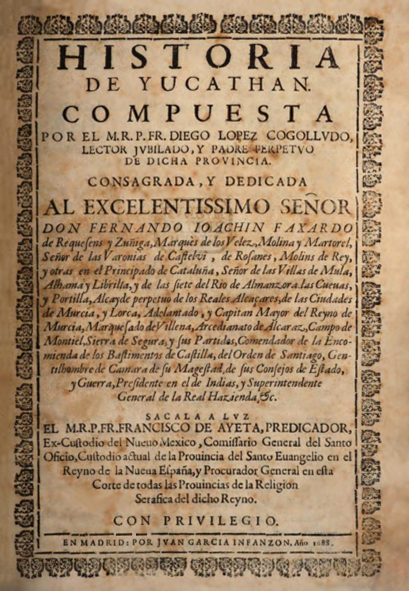
Engraved title page, Historia de Yucathan, 1688

Historia de Yucathan (Madrid, 1688): The first three chapters of the Historia de Yucathan present a civil history of how the Spanish conquered the Yucatán Peninsula and its people, the Maya, in three long campaigns. The first campaign was started by Francisco de Montejo in 1527 and the last was led by his son of the same name in 1545. Chapter four contains a description of the land, customs, and beliefs of the Maya people, whom López thinks descended from the Phoenicians and the Carthaginians. The remaining six chapters are dedicated to the history of the Franciscan order's attempts and progress in converting and instructing the Maya.

== See also ==
- Juan Coronel
