= Louisville Colonels (disambiguation) =

The Louisville Colonels were a Major League Baseball team in the American Association and National League from 1882 to 1899.

Louisville Colonels has also been the name of several other sports teams:

- Louisville Colonels (minor league baseball), a minor league baseball team from 1901 to 1962 and 1968 to 1972
- Louisville Colonels (NFL), the name by which the Louisville American football franchise was known in 1926
- Louisville Colonels (PBLA), a Professional Basketball League of America team during the 1947–48 season

== See also ==
- Kentucky Colonels (disambiguation)
