= Gregório Nunes Coronel =

Portuguese Augustinian theologian and preacher

Gregório Nunes Coronel (b. in Kingdom of Portugal, about 1548; d. about 1620) was a Portuguese Augustinian theologian, writer, and preacher.

== Life ==
At an early age, he entered the Order of St. Augustine. Soon after his ordination to the priesthood, he became famous as a theologian and master of sacred eloquence.

When his fame was at its zenith, he left Portugal and was appointed by the Duke of Savoy as chaplain and preacher to his court. He came to Rome by order of his superiors and there took the degree of Doctor of Divinity. Coronel taught theology for many years in Rome.

At this time, the controversy about the efficacy of divine grace and free will, between the Jesuits and Dominicans, was at its height. Pope Clement VIII established the Congregatio de Auxiliis to decide the points at issue, and Coronel was appointed by the pope to the position of secretary. He was continued in this office by Pope Clement's successor, Pope Paul V. As a reward for his services to the congregation, he was offered a bishopric, but he declined. He attended the general chapter of his order, held at Rome in 1620, as definitor of the Sardinian province.

== Works ==
Coronel's principal works are:

- Libri decem de vera Christi Ecclesia (Rome, 1594);
- Libri sex de optimo reipublicæ statu (Rome, 1597);
- De traditionibus apostolicis (Rome, 1597).

A history of the Congregatio de Auxiliis, in manuscript, is preserved in the Angelica Library in Rome.
