= Juan Coronel =

Spanish Franciscan missionary (1569–1651)

Juan Coronel (1569 in Spain – 1651 at Mérida, Mexico) was a Spanish Franciscan missionary.

== Life ==
He made his academic studies at the University of Alcalá de Henares, and joined the Franciscans of the province of Castile. He was sent to Yucatán, Mexico, in 1590, and there so familiarized himself with the Maya language that he was able to teach it, the historian Diego López de Cogolludo being one of his pupils.

Coronel was one of the foremost Christian teachers in Yucatán in the seventeenth century. He was a strict Observantine for sixty-seven years, always travelling barefooted. His austerity impeded his election to the office of Provincial of the Franciscan Order in Yucatán.

== Works ==
Cogolludo says he wrote a Maya grammar (Arte) that was printed in Mexico, of which, however, nothing else is known. A catechism in Maya: "Doctrina cristiana en lengua Maya", was published in Mexico in 1620, and in the same year there appeared in print, also in Mexico, "Discursos predicables y tratados espirituales en lengua Maya". Both are exceedingly rare.
