= Luis Nuñez Coronel =

Luis Núñez Coronel Latinized as Ludovicus Coronel (c. 1480 – c. 1531) was a Spanish theologian, logician, and natural philosopher. Along with his brother Antonio, he examined the ideas of mechanics from Aristotle.

== Biography ==
Coronel was born in Segovia the son of Diego Núñez de León. He was educated at Salamanca before going to the Collège de Montaigu in Paris where he studied under John Major. His brothers Antonio Fernández and Francisco also went to the Collège de Montaigu. Antonio even became the rector at the college. He was ordained priest in 1512 and received a doctorate in theology in 1514. He was influenced by the Oxford "calculatores", Jean Dullaert, and Alvaro Thomaz. In 1507 he wrote on logic in his Tractatus [de formatione] syllogismorum and in 1511 he wrote Physice perscrutationes. Coronel dealt with the concepts of infinity and vacuum within a theological framework. Coronel left Paris following the arrival of Domingo de Soto and moved to Flanders where he was a preacher in 1520. Coronel met Erasmus and was a follower and promoter of his ideas. He became a secretary to the Archbishop of Seville, Alfonso Monrique, in 1527 and was then posted bishop to the Canary Islands where he died.
