= Daniel Medina =

Venezuelan artist (born 1978)

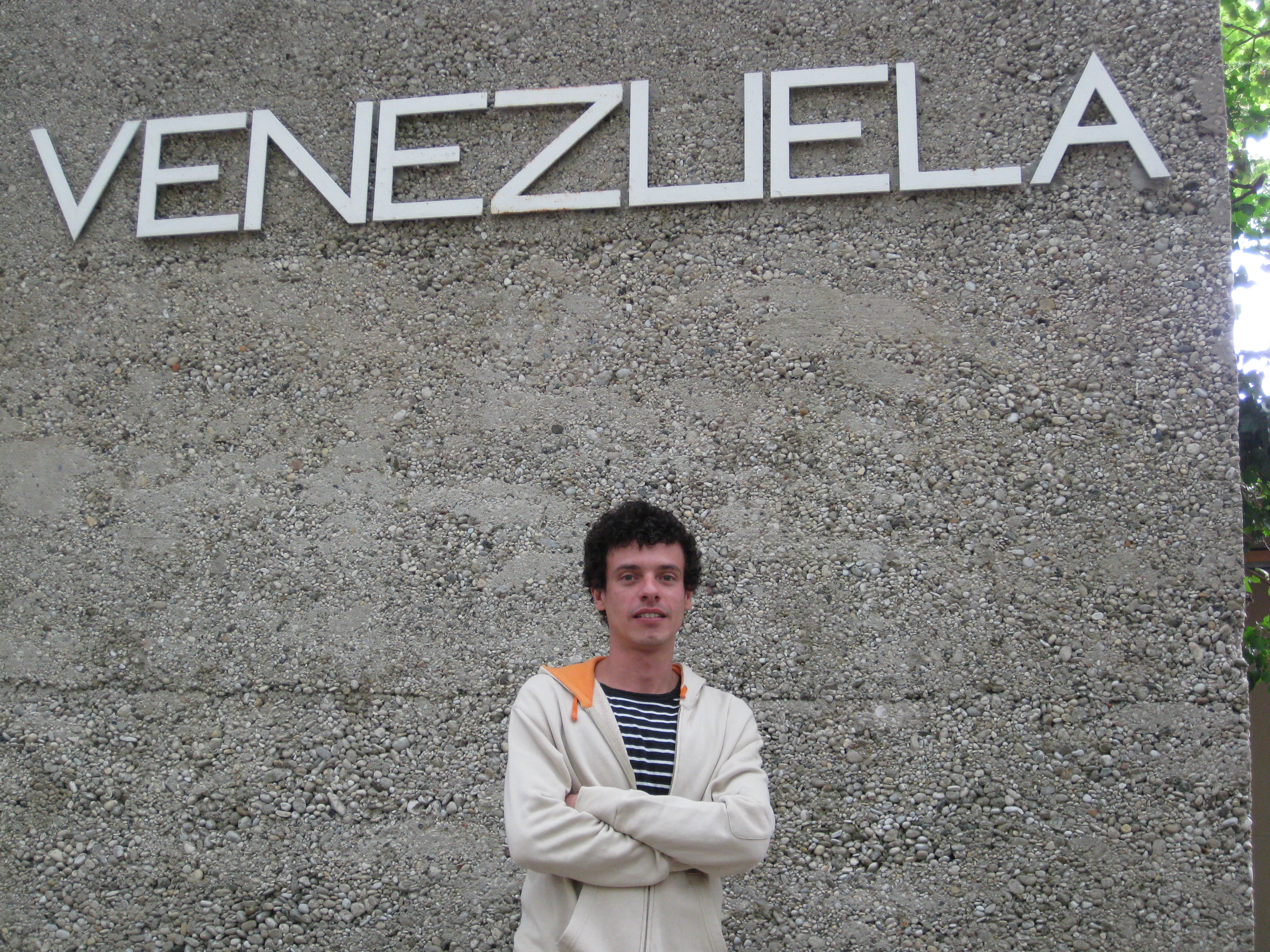
Medina in front of the Venezuelan Pavilion Venice 2009

Daniel Medina (born 1978) is a Venezuelan artist. He was one of several artists in the Venezuelan Pavilion at the 2009 Venice Biennale.
