= Rick Shelley =

American novelist

- Born: January 1, 1947; Kankakee, Illinois, U.S.
- Died: January 27, 2001 (aged 54)
- Occupation: Writer
- Writing career
- Genre: Military science fiction

Rick Shelley (January 1, 1947 – January 27, 2001) was an American writer of primarily military science fiction. He was born in Kankakee, Illinois.

== Bibliography ==
=== Varayan Memoir ===
Varay is a medieval land situated between our world and the all magical world of Fairy. The Varayan Memoir follows the adventures of Gil Tyner a college student turned medieval adventurer.

- Son of the Hero (1990)
- The Hero of Varay (1991)
- The Hero King (1992)

=== Seven Towers ===
- The Wizard at Mecq (1994)
- The Wizard at Home (1995)

=== Second Commonwealth War ===
- The Buchanan Campaign (1995)
- The Fires Of Coventry (1996)
- Return to Camerein (1997)

=== 13 Spaceborn ===
- Until Relieved (1994)
- Side Show (1994)
- Jump Pay (1995)

=== Dirigent Mercenary Corps ===
- Officer Cadet (1998)
- Lieutenant (1998)
- Captain (1999)
- Major (1999)
- Lieutenant Colonel (2000)
- Colonel (2000)

=== Spec Ops Squad ===
- Holding The Line (2001)
- Deep Strike (2002)
- Sucker Punch (2002)
