= Thierry Geoffroy =

Danish-French artist

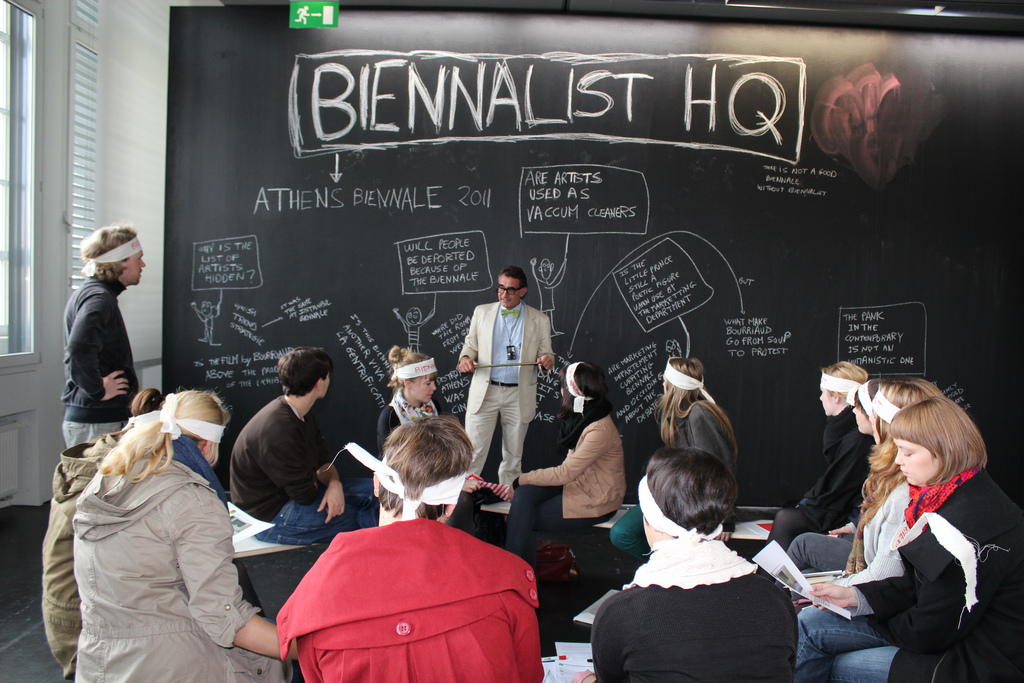
Thierry Geoffroy/Colonel at ZKM Museum with students from SHG in 2011

Thierry Geoffroy (French pronunciation: [tjɛʁi ʒɔfʁwa]; born 1961), also known as Colonel, is a Danish-French artist, living in Copenhagen, Denmark. He is a Conceptual artist using a wide variety of media including video and installations, often collaborative with other artists.

== Format Art ==
Format art is a form of art defined in the praxis of Thierry Geoffroy. An art format can be defined as a reproducible, rule-defined configuration with a set of identifying characteristics that remain the same in each recreation of the original, involving a group or audience that partake in the relevant act. An art format can be defined as a reproducible, rule-defined configuration with a set of identifying characteristics that remain the same in each recreation of the original, involving a group or audience that partake in the relevant act. The format itself is the art and is intentioned to work as a catalyst for changing the perspectives of those involved as well as the audience. In 1989 he wrote a manifest on five types of moving exhibitions (Manifeste – Les differents Types de moving Exhibitions). Since then he has worked on several other formats, including the "Emergency Room", which has toured internationally and has been shown at P.S. 1 Contemporary Art Center in New York City. The formats generally involve many participants and are designed to investigate dysfunctions and emergencies while social psychology (e.g., conflicts, collaboration) unfolds.

His method is inspired by the TV program format: art institutions wanting to use an art format must purchase a license and agree to use the original title, architectural concept, and methods. As in TV, vast documentation is always created with video and photo material as central elements.The goal is training the awareness muscle and addressing the question "what is important now?"

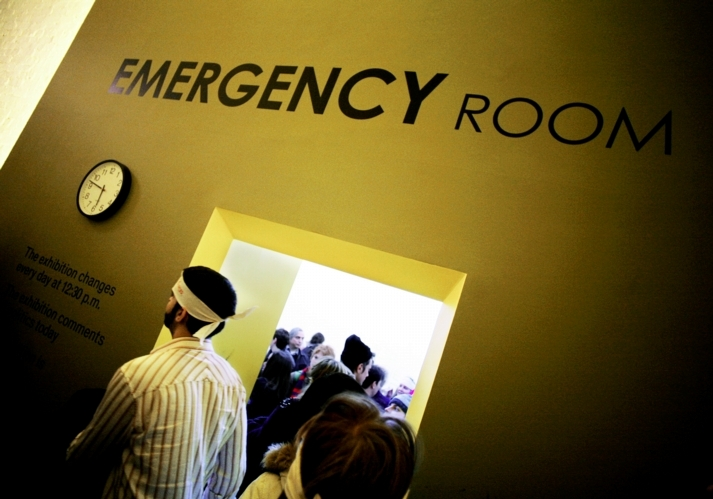
Emergency Room Format MoMA / PS1 2007

=== Emergency Room ===
Geoffroy devised the 'Emergency Room' concept to allow artists to respond to current events promptly. The exhibits are changed every day. Artists bring their work to the specially designed circular room, Emergency Room space at a set time every day in order to present, working within a deadline. The artwork shown must have been created within 24 hours of its exhibiting, in order to keep the exhibition as in keeping with the now as possible. The art should specifically relate to themes of emergency; i.e. ongoing crises, topical issues or socio-political problems, the artwork is debated amongst Geoffroy, the media, audience and artists. 'Emergency Rooms have been held in Copenhagen, Berlin, New York, Athens, Hanoi, Johannesburg, Naples and Paris and over 450 artists have taken part. After 24 hours, artworks from Emergency Room are exhibited in the Delay Museum, an adjacent exhibiting space, and become part of the Delay Museum collection. It is Geoffroy's vision to have a permanent Emergency Room in every major city in the world.

=== Biennalist ===
Biennalist is another Art Format by Thierry Geoffroy / Colonel, concurrently commenting on active biennials and managed cultural events through artworks. Biennalist takes the thematics of the biennales and similar events like documenta, festivals and conferences seriously, questioning the established structures of the staged art events in order to contribute to the debate, which they wish to generate. Often the pertinence of the themes of the biennales is tested on location. Biennalist has been activated at the Venice Biennale 1999, 2001, 2003, 2005, 2007, 2009, 2011, 2013, 2015, 2017 and 2019, Athens Biennale 2007 and 2011, Biennale of Sydney 2010, Sarema Biennale 1997, Rotterdam Biennale 1990, U-Turn Quadriennale 2008, Manifesta 2010, Liverpool Biennial 2010 and Istanbul Biennial 2007.

=== Critical Run ===
Critical Run is an art format, like Emergency Room and Biennalist. Running participants debate about emergency topics like climate change, xenophobia, wars, hypocrisy, apathy. Critical Run organised by Thierry Geoffroy / Colonel has been activated on invitation from institutions such as Moderna Museet in Stockholm, MoMA PS1, Witte de With Rotterdam, ZKM Karlsruhe, Liverpool Biennale, Sprengel Museum in Hannover, and at the Venice Biennale but runs have also just happened on the spot because a debate was necessary here and now.

Participants have been Swedish art critics, German police, American climate activists, Chinese Gallerists, Brazilian students, and many others in over 20 countries. A room presenting 40 critical runs at once was presented as part of Geoffroy's 2020 "The Awareness Muscle Training Centre" exhibition at Museum Villa Stuck in Munich, Germany.

=== Awareness Muscle ===
The Awareness Muscle format is a body of work by the artist that encompasses several different projects in the artists career, but most importantly indicates a mix of in-depth questioning on a participant while they engage in physical exercise with the help of a training circuit involving fitness machines. These machines are at once metaphorical and poetic, all relating to a different chosen topic (for example "the thinking machine" reprises themes of life satisfaction and other topics that require cognitive evaluation). This format was the subject of a presentation in Toronto's Blackwood Gallery in 2007 and was realised in totality as part of "The Awareness Muscle Training Center" exhibition at Museum Villa Stuck. The machines form a total circuit that intends to train the visitors awareness of their own attitudes towards issues such as democracy, diversity, climate change and the environment.

=== Penetration ===
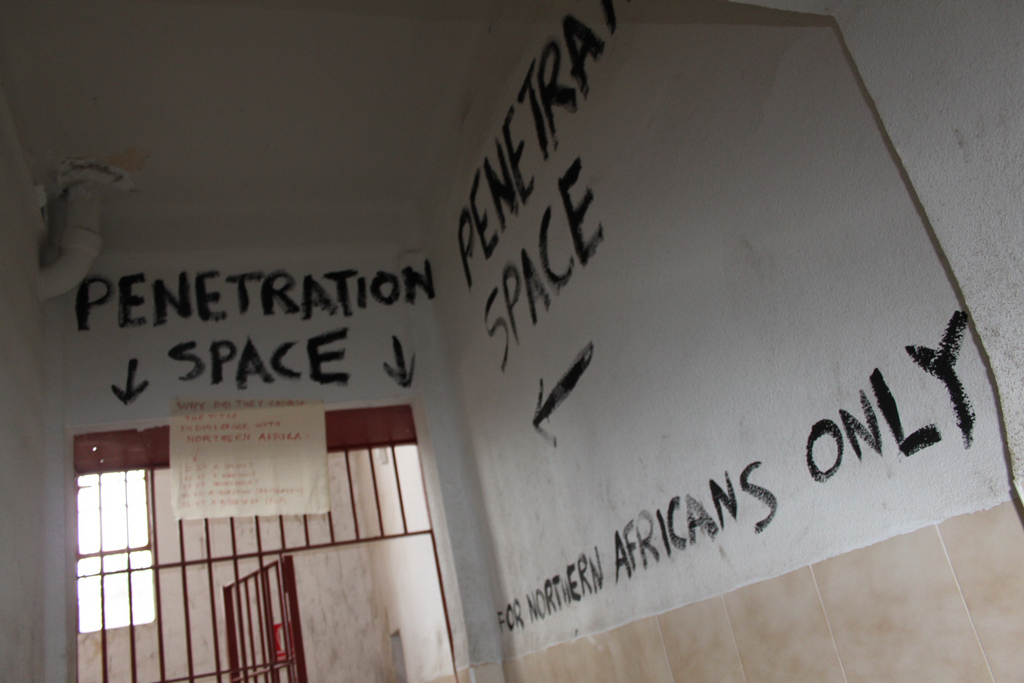
Thierry Geoffroy/Colonel offering Penetration Space at Manifesta Biennial / Murcia 2010 to North African artists

The "Penetration" format is an artist's act of placing an artwork within another artist's exhibition. The Penetration is a solution to avoid the lateness of bureaucratic art institutions, by circulating space between the actors – artist to artist. A penetration is not only meant as a shortcut, but also a beneficial collaboration. The format has been seen at the Athens Biennial "Emergency Room", at the Istanbul Biennial, at the Venice Biennial in 2007 (by Biennalist), at the Venice Biennial in 2009 (penetrations at the Venezuelan Pavilion with Daniel Medina, at the Finnish Pavilion with Jussi Kivi and at the Belgian boat with Jacques Charlier, curated by Enrico Lunghi). The "Penetration" format was also activated at Manifesta 8 in Murcia. Here the format took place in a 'Penetration Room', combining Geoffroy's "penetration" art. The 2010 Biennale took the theme of "North Africa" and Geoffroy invited North African artists to intervene (or penetrate) the exhibition space.

=== Extracteur ===
Extracteur has existed from the beginning of Geoffroy's artistic career, being presented in his 1989 Manifesto "Moving Exhibition". The format can involve sending a person (character) to create a photographic collection or text participation of a personal experience. In 2011, a digital version was designed to "retake the right to reread and reorganise the representation of the world" as a reaction to social media's collection of private information. He first used the format during the 2011 Venice Biennale.

=== Slowdance Debate ===
Another format by Geoffroy is the slowdance debate. This format consists of strangers dancing with another in an embrace, while debating on topics of concern. Debate topics are of a similar nature to those in Critical Run and has often been activated as a less physically demanding, slower option to the running format. The format can be seen as an attempt to inspire awareness, openness and expression between people, to make people more aware of the world around them and more likely to react to current problems. It has been activated in convergence with other formats, for instance at the MoMA/ PS1 exhibition of Emergency Room, where it was activated on most Sundays and as part of Biennalist multiple times at the Venice Biennale. A Slow Dance Debate at the Roskilde Festival was featured on the programme “The Meaning of Life” on DR2.

== Artwork ==
While Thierry Geoffroy works frequently with what he calls format art, he also creates physical artworks to convey immediate expressions about the world and art. While his tent artworks may be the most famous, he has also used a variety of mediums to showcase statements (usually of a critical nature) and drawings of his own. These have taken the form of neon signs, personalized traffic signs, artworks on cardboard ("cartons"), canvas artworks, as well as photographic or video pieces.

=== Tent Artworks ===
==== Documenta Kassel ====
Geoffroy has used tents over his career to comment on ongoing situations, usually in contexts specific to the issue. The most notable tent artwork he has produced is one titled "The Emergency Will Replace The Contemporary". This unsolicited tent was placed by Geoffroy in front of the Fridericianum at Documenta Kassel during Documenta 13. The tent was spray-painted with the title statement, as well as ""Art in delay can not have impact", "The contemporary is always too late, never in time" and "I am not working for the tourism office". These statements centre around a critique of Documenta and the contemporary artworld, how the spectacle of contemporary art, especially in its attempts at putting forward a humanitarian image, often prevent any concrete change from happening. "The Emergency Will Replace the Contemporary" is the notion that an alert and active approach to art will take over the structure of the contemporary artworld in the future. A photograph of the tent appeared on the cover of the Belgium Hart magazine. At this point the tent was removed, leaving scorch marks where it had been. The tent was later bought by Kunsthalle Mannheim, becoming part of their permanent collection. Strangely enough at Documenta 14, Documenta commissioned a large marble tent, similar in appearance to Geoffroy's, for display in Athens. Geoffroy produced another tent artwork, spray painted this time with "Welcome Cheap Workers'' as a comment on Documenta's moving to Athens.

==== Copenhagen ====
He has also created a series of tent artworks that comment on the coronavirus lockdown's impacts on society. Placed in several spots around Copenhagen during the first coronavirus lockdown period, themes presented by the tents questioned the situations impact on the homeless, the designation of essential and non-essential industries and the democratic issues resulting from the pandemic precautions.

==== Venice ====
In 2017, Geoffroy attended the Venice Biennale and used one of his tents to question the theme of that year "Viva Arte Viva", which was said to be inspired by humanism. In response to the curator Christine Macel's declaration that art was the last bastion for uprising, Geoffroy placed a tent by the Giardini, in front of one of the megayachts, with the slogan "Is art the last bastion for uprise?" questioning the capacity for art to be a purely expressive, humanistic platform while the Biennale attracts the global elite.

=== Tents in an exhibition ===
==== Photographs ====
Geoffroy's tents have been featured in exhibitions in the form of photographic prints, in this way the original context of the tent can remain intact and the tents retain their site specificity. For example, in the exhibition "Constructing the World" in Kunsthalle Mannheim, Geoffroy exhibited several prints of his tent artworks in Venice, Athens and Kassel.

==== Sculptures ====
Several tent artworks have been featured in museum exhibitions, such as Emergency Room in Wroclaw, Biennalist at the ZKM Museum and at the Kunsthalle Mannheim. In this setting the tents become a sculpture, with symbolic, placard-like surfaces. In the Kunsthalle Mannheim exhibition, Geoffroy also had the opportunity to place his tents throughout the museum collection.

=== Cartons ===
Geoffroy often works with unconventional materials, most often using cardboard cartons to express socio-political, critical or philosophical statements, usually accompanied by sketches or photos that relate to the statement. These are often made in convergence with Geoffroy's other formats and used as a way to directly convey Geoffroy's ideas, fears or realisations on themes present at that point in time, usually concerning things happening locally or globally. These can also be categorized as Geoffroy's own ultracontemporary emergency art. Themes shown on the cartons have varied greatly, from critiques of Documenta to site specific climate change concerns and personal observations and worries.

=== Neons ===
Geoffroy has used neon signs to express his artistic statements, dealing with similar themes to his tent artworks and cartons. These are usually in Geoffroy's own handwriting and sometimes contain a hashtag, as a conceptually linkage to internet circulation and immediate visibility. The statements are usually imperative and peremptory, the bright light further provoking a tone of alarm. Subjects range from societal observations such as "Coolness is Our Defeat" or climate change warnings "Now Before it is too Late". These neon signs have been featured in a number of Geoffroy's exhibitions, including "Too Late" at the Sabsay Gallery in Copenhagen and "The Awareness Muscle Training Center" at Museum Villa Stuck in Munich.

=== Traffic Signs ===
Geoffroy uses traffic signs in his work. The motif of directional and symbolic instruction inherent in traffic signs is repurposed to convey proposed caution, action or observation by Geoffroy, sometimes using wordplay and paradoxical symbol and word mixes to provoke rethinking and questioning of societies, institutions and even governmental policies. One particular piece that uses the roundabout traffic signal, reads "La conséquence de l'oeuvre c'est encore l'oeuvre", roughly translating to 'the consequence of the total work is a continuance of the work'. This is an ingrained idea in Geoffroy's work, expressing the concept of the never-finished artwork that is a constant sequence of pieces.

=== Canvas/ Retard/ Too Late ===
Geoffroy questions the canvas and themes of time by painting "Retard" (fr.), "Trop Tard"(fr.) or "Too Late" on canvases, expressing the notion that art is in delay. He also uses canvases to express future intentions, painting a date on a canvas on which an action of his planning will take place. In these pieces, Geoffroy's approach is to use art as a platform for collective action.

== Photography ==
=== Photographic Self Portraits ===
From a young age, Geoffroy experimented with self-portraiture. In 1974, after his grandfather gave him a camera and taught him how to take pictures and process them, Geoffroy produced a series of self-portraits. He worked with a self-timer to take these photographs. In them he played different roles, dressing up and composing images together to create stories. He dressed up in military uniform, tennis clothes, etc., often playing two roles in opposition, such as ‘cowboy and indian’ and a series called “Me against Me” where he played his own rival. He later published this work in his book Strategies d’existence and his Moving Exhibition Manifeste 1989; the latter he adorned with a self-portrait of him playing “The Good Boy”, sitting at his father's desk doing work. Geoffroy exhibited these at Café Krasnapolsky in 1990, in an exhibition called “Why are people so crazy about Cindy Sherman?” (Schube, 2002).

=== Photographie d’Auteur ===
Geoffroy progressed with his photography throughout the 80s and 90s, starting a series on the behaviours of tourists in several locations, starting with Peru and Egypt in 1982, continuing on through Mexico, Guatemala, China and Thailand. In 1986, an article titled “A Photographic Star is Born” was published in Danish magazine, fotomagazine. His work about tourists confronted with poverty in India was published in the French Photomagazine in 1989 and was the subject of an article in a Danish publication the same year. In 1995, he won the Photographic Book Prize in Denmark. His photography was written about in numerous Danish publications throughout the early 90's, especially as he began to hold happenings and performances in venues such as Charlottenborg, Billedhuset and Café Krasnapolski. His approach to photography was also commended for being free of exoticism, instead focusing on the cross-cultural relations between strangers that travelling produces, and what effect this has on the traveller. As he continued his photographic practice in Copenhagen, the mode in which he took photos was also described, due to the confrontational, intense techniques he used, getting extremely close to people and up in their faces, at clubs and other public spaces, being described as a “manic archeologist”.

=== Exhibitionist ===
Already in the late 1980s, he shifted his mode of working with photography, starting to collect other people's photos to exhibit. He started receiving recognition for his unusual exhibiting practices, crashing art events and exhibiting in public spaces with images on his clothing, assembling groups of people exhibiting their own private photos in the same fashion. In Paris, he used a local radio station to broadcast a happening at the FIAC, inviting amateur photographers and members of the public to come with pictures of themselves attached to their clothing; this resulted in the gathering of 35 individuals at the venue, forming an impromptu exhibition. Geoffroy would organize similar events at the Centre Pompidou and the Grand Palais in Paris in 1988. He wrote a manifesto in 1989 describing the different types of exhibitions he had done and would go on to do, denoted by five specific types of what he called “Moving Exhibitions”, which would become the foundation of many of his future art formats.

Elements of this exhibionist type exhibition are similar to aspects of social media site Facebook: the idea of “friends”, a “wall”, “posts” and “limited access” are all a component of both Facebook and Geoffroy's exhibitionist format. In order to participate in the happening, one must exhibit a photo of themselves and create an identification profile, this allows the person to become a “friend” and offers them access to the photos of others, in order to create self-criticism towards themselves and solidarity and openness among others. People were encouraged to bring personal photographs, such as family photos. His tourist fascination was further integrated in his new approach to photography, on his travels and afterwards he would ask tourists for four of their travel photos, to exhibit back in Denmark He extended this practice in an exhibition at Billedhuset in Copenhagen, inviting members of the public to bring their tourist snapshots to exhibit there.

=== Artwork with images from the media ===
Geoffroy also worked with photographs from media sources. This type of work is often related to a concept of time - collecting media sources each day and creating artwork that is then exhibited within a 24-hour period. These artworks differ in theme and aesthetic and have been included in an assortment of exhibitions by the artist often in connection with Emergency Room or Gallery Ultracontemporaine. The mode in which they are created is to necessitate that the topics shown are concurrent with what is happening in the world. Geoffroy has created a number of series in this fashion, the most extensive being “The Blue Helmets” and “Measurement of Cultural Distance”.

==== The Blue Helmets ====
In 1991, Geoffroy started the series “The Blue Helmets” which would go on for 10 years, ending on September 11, 2001. In this project, he cut out all of the pictures in the newspaper that showed soldiers and painted their helmets blue. This would show the images out of context, allowing him to reconfigure the interpretation of the image. The blue helmets are references to those of UN soldiers, by painting every soldier with a blue helmet he is recontextualising the nature of the soldiers in the image, as a metaphor for “innocence and good intention”. The blue helmets represent a reality where all soldiers are peace-keepers, inducing a paradoxical interpretation of the images, wherein the blue conveys a calming, friendly impression and the image itself may contradict it. It can also reveal staged photos that work as propaganda, or point to the troubling nature of the effect the UN blue has on people, in that the blue encourages people to take the image at face value and trust that these soldiers are as well-intentioned as the UN wants to present them. This project has also been called “Colonel: Peintre de la Justice” relaying the project in terms of his intentional naive characterisations of all soldiers, questioning a painter's power by creating an alternative dimension where all soldiers are humanitarian aids.

==== Measurement of Cultural Distance ====
In 2002, he started a project called “Measurement of Cultural Distance” at Vejle Kunstmuseum, which he continued in Galerie Sparwasser Berlin in 2003 and at Kalashnikovv Berlin in 2016. In this project, Geoffroy looks at differences in cultural representations in media images, by taking an image where two people of different cultural/ethnographic backgrounds appear, and measuring the distance between these two people. He has often activated this project with different groups of people such as librarians or gallerists, asking them to cut out images, measure the distance and then ponder the reality of the cultural gap between two subjects in real life. This was done in the Helsingør Library as part of a project called “Ultrafast”, where the participants would measure the cultural distance in cut-out newspaper photos, and then exhibit them on their bookmobiles on the same day.

== Notable exhibitions ==
=== Emergency Room, MoMA/PS1, NYC, 2007 ===
In 2007, Geoffroy exhibited his format Emergency Room in the Museum of Modern Art in New York. This was the longest exhibiting period of the format, consisting of 7 weeks and involving 29 artists. There were convergences of other formats such as Critical Run and Slow Dance Debate, as well as including the use of individually expressed statement headbands. After the exhibition changeover, there were sometimes yoga sessions with the artists and the public. A daily blog was kept up on the exhibition and a podcast with a soundpiece from DJ Copyflex was also produced and broadcast on Times Out Radio. The exhibition was reported on in TV segments by ABC News and Reuters and discussed on a radio show, “the Brian Lehrer Show”, and also widely publicized by international media. Involving as many media sources was an intentional strategy of the format, to expand the exhibitions reach to as many people around the world as possible. The number of visitors to the exhibition exceeded over a thousand every day. Emergency Room was praised for its atmosphere as well as concept and message, specifically in the ways it challenged the contemporary art world and raised the importance of debating current issues. A retrospective article about the exhibition entitled “Twelve Years After” was published in Arte al dia in 2019.

=== The Awareness Muscle Training Center, Museum Villa Stuck, Munich, 2020 ===
In 2020, Geoffroy presented the Awareness Muscle Training Center in the Museum Villa Stuck in Munich, Germany (villastuck.de, 2020). This was made up of 5 rooms and an outside space: The Training Room, Gallery Ultracontemporaine, The Energy Room, The Delay Museum, The Strategy Room and The Traffic Space. The Training Room consisted of participants using modified training machines while being questioned about the meaning of their lives by the exhibitions “instructors'' through a defined routine; the Gallery Ultracontemporaine presented artworks and photographs of Geoffroy’s, exhibited the same day they were made; The Energy Room was a collection of 40 Critical Run’s on screens presented in a circular space; The Strategy Room was a headquarter to get people involved in planning Critical Runs and The Traffic Space showed traffic signs with various self-drawn pictures and statements by the artist himself.

=== Biennalist at ZKM Museum, Karlsruhe, 2011 ===
In 2011, Geoffroy held an exhibition at the ZKM in Karlsruhe which was both a mini-retrospective of his Biennalist format and a commissioned investigation into the Athens Biennale, supplemented by a training and HQ at the museum before and afterwards. He activated his Biennalist format at the Biennale, entitled Monodrome, investigating the difference between the proposed aims and the reality of the Biennale. This led to the discovery of the gentrification and police-enforced removal of ‘undesirable’ inhabitants of the area, in preparation for the Biennale, as well as the total lack of attempts to involve the surrounding communities. Geoffroy also enacted his Extracteur format on Athenians, collecting their open responses and experiences of the ongoing riots happening in close proximity to the Biennale. He also commented on the situation through on-location tent artworks and street graffiti. After tackling these issues and confronting the insincerity of the Biennales purported aims on-site, Geoffroy later relays his findings during the exhibition itself.

=== Artistes de Garde/ HQ, CPH, 2009 ===
On the 4th of December 2009, Thierry Geoffroy opened an exhibition at the Copenhagen gallery, Gallery Poulsen. Geoffroy invited international activists and, artists and NGOs to participate, in particular the American activist duo “The Yes Men”, as the exhibition purposely coincided with the COP15 Climate Change Conference in Copenhagen. Here, the Yes Men staged news footage from COP15 that Canada had agreed to give 3 billion dollars to Uganda for their climate debt and to cut their emissions by 40% by 2020, creating a slew of prank articles and provoking a response from the real Canadian Environmental Minister of Canada. Also involved in the project were NGOs such as Avaaz.org, the Climate Action Factory and MSAction Aids, as well as private detectives, journalists and other prominent figures (art-agenda.com, 2010). Geoffroy organized Critical Runs every day over the course of the conference, attracting many climate activists to participate. The exhibition also included Geoffroy's own emergency art, which was changed within 24 hours of exhibiting, dealing with, and commenting on in real time, the updates from the climate conference as well as other issues. Also exhibited were screenshots of Facebook pages transformed into paintings, showing a series of satirical fictitious profiles Geoffroy created to comment on actual situations in character, often dealing with topics such as climate change or racism. The title HQ is a reference to the Headquarter format structure of the exhibition, wherein Geoffroy uses an art space as a strategic centrepoint for developing actions that can make a difference. In this specific case the exhibition was particularly involved in critiquing the ineffectiveness of COP15 and on the role of artists as a force for green-washing. Later, a Diagnosis of the exhibition's effectiveness was shown at the end of the exhibition.

=== Art et Publicité - MM Museum, CPH, 1991 ===
In 1991, Thierry Geoffroy had an exhibition at the Copenhagen MM Museum. Entitled “Art et Publicité”, the exhibition presented a mixture of different media works, including pictures from the Nazi tourism office in Copenhagen from 1940 to 1942 and artworks made of images of sports stars wearing sponsored clothing. It also included the idea of ‘same day, same media’, where Geoffroy swapped out the exhibition contents every day with daily adjustances, specifically concerning what was happening in the world at the time, for example, the UN council's Gulf War ultimatum. Also shown were images exploring the use of children and sport in advertisements.

=== Emergency Room, University of Fine Arts, Hanoi, 2009 & 2011 ===
In 2009, Emergency Room was exhibited in the University of Fine Arts in Hanoi, Vietnam, in connection with the state visit of the Danish Queen, Crown Prince and Princess, who visited the exhibition. It has been Geoffroy's vision to secure a permanent Emergency Room space, yet his attempts have been to no avail. However, in Hanoi he had the opportunity to experience an approximation of this vision in that he activated the format two years apart in the same space. In 2011, he was invited to reactivate the Emergency Room format in the University of Fine Arts. This would coincide with the state visit of Crown Prince Frederik of Denmark. The two activations gave the project longevity in the area, allowing an analysis of which themes were most present and of note in the two-year span. Themes that were particularly present were climate change, increasing pollution levels, generational social gaps and corruption (BBC). Both activations involved Danish and Vietnamese artists, as well as artists of other nationalities.

=== Medienarbeiten/Media-Based Works, Sprengel Museum, Hannover, 2002 ===
In 2002, Geoffroy had a solo show at the Sprengel Museum in Hannover, entitled “Media-Based Works from the Last Ten Years”. In this he presented photographs, t-shirts with self-printed photos on them, clips from his series “Capitain” on Danish television and an assortment of objects that further divulged his work with different media for the past decade. Many pieces have a transformative nature, for example Geoffroy taking a photograph of his, getting it into the newspaper through the ad section, then using that newspaper image to a published news article. There were pictures of happenings Geoffroy had arranged, where people attended wearing pictures of themselves. The clips from his TV series demonstrated the way the artist used television as an alternative platform to show his artwork and to question the medium, these were shown on television screens in the space. It also showed how Geoffroy used inspiration from artists like Daniel Buren and Marcel Duchamp for his own conceptions. The artist also had the opportunity to place some of his works in the permanent collection of the museum, for example next to paintings by Picasso. The museum team were included every day in an active part of the project, finding newspaper images of the Iraqi conflict that was currently building up and making paper planes out of them, flying them down from higher stories to the main passageway. As these began to pile up, they took on the appearance of debris, creating an uncomfortable bridge between the real life conflict and how it was being presented in the West. All in all, the exhibition presented an overview of Geoffroy's media circulations, combining archive material and newly refigured artworks to examine the cumulative effect of Geoffroy's media work.

=== Extracteur, Sprengel Museum, Hannover, 2011 ===
In 2011, Geoffroy was invited to participate in a group show called Photography Calling at the Sprengel Museum in Hannover. Other artists included Diane Arbus, Wolfgang Tillmans and Jeff Wall. Geoffroy's exhibit was a rethinking of what to do now as an artist, in relation to the overtaking of social media as a visual platform and archive for photos, looking for an art museum response to this issue. The ‘Extracteur’ format dates back to Geoffroy's artistic beginnings, formerly being assigned under the category of Fondation Moving Exhibition Typ Exhibitioniste, existing as a format to get people to give the artist access to their own private photos to exhibit. The version presented in the exhibition was ‘digital extracteur’. The 2011 edition included a team of ‘extracteurs’ collecting memory cards and phone data from people. With their permission, the extracteurs would take the entire contents of their phone or camera's visual data, with a signed contract that these could be used by the artist for artistic purposes. This was done in Hannover, at the Venice Biennale and later by Geoffroy himself during the riots in Athens. This data was made available only to other participants (called ‘exhibitionists’) who had also given access to their own images. The exhibition also presented the history of the format, its relation to Facebook in the ownership of images (Geoffroy's projects predating the social media site by several decades) and involved the Hannover Police and the Park Frau in their own extracteur project. In this, the police took images every day and presented them along a pie chart in the museum space, having to situate their photos within the context of ‘work’, ‘private’, a blending of these or ‘emergencies’. Another feature of the exhibition was a bench where couples could consolidate their relationships through taking a picture on a ‘Dating Bench’. Slowdance Debates and Critical Runs were also activated during the exhibition.

=== The Anatomy of Prejudice, IKM Museum, Oslo, 2017 ===
Geoffroy activated another Extracteur format in the form of a 5-year growing exhibition at the IKM Museum in Oslo. The project has the aim to build a census on prejudice through the participation of the museum's visitors, attracting ca. 200 people a week (pre-covid) to partake in a self-analysis of images from their camera roll. The exhibition takes the form of a hanging sculpture, where participants print out photos revealing prejudice from their phones, and clip these to the suspended installation. In this way they can reflect on the ways they categorize people and what effect this can have on society. At the end of the 5-year period, the installation will have collected over 50,000 active participants' experiences of xenophobia. It will also be a sculpture of data that can be studied. By looking at people's individual data, the exhibition can form an idea of where prejudice starts and how it is evident on a personal level.

=== A Great Painter, Gallerie Asbæk, Copenhagen, 2007 ===
In 2007, Geoffroy held an exhibition with the title ‘A Great Painter’ at the Galerie Asbæk in Copenhagen. This exhibition explored Geoffroy's conceptual painting projects, its title a kind of paradoxical take on the notion of a painter, given that Geoffroy is not a painter in the classic sense. The Gallerie Asbæk was also a painting-based gallery, leading to an intentional questioning of the idea of a painter. Included were photographs of Geoffroy's “Protest Underwear” project, where he got participants to paint statements on their clothes, as well as paintings by copyists of Geoffroy's social media pages, one such showing Geoffroy's artist ranking on a website. The exhibition was an exploration into the question “Do painters have power?” and contained various juxtapositions between media content and painting, for example through the word “la Toile” (fr.) which means ‘canvas’ but is also the word used for ‘the wall’ on Facebook. Among other ideas, it also showed how the ideas of Marcel Duchamp were integrated in Geoffroy's work, taking examples from his earlier TV series episodes. Putting screenshots and pictures into painting form through the use of copyists further confuses the role of the painter; one particular example exemplifies this confusion, a painting of a bullet wound being painted on Geoffroy made by a copyist. In this painting, with the same title as the exhibition, Geoffroy leads viewers to ponder who the painter is in this scenario and how painting interferes with war propaganda.

=== Maldives Pavilion, Venice Biennale, 2013 ===
In 2013, Thierry Geoffroy was invited to exhibit in the Maldives Pavilion at the Venice Biennale. He used this space to set up a Mobile Emergency Room and display tent artworks. The question “Is climate change still an emergency?” was particularly pertinent, appearing on a tent and being a central theme of Geoffroy's projects for the biennale. He later used tents to “test hospitality”; working with the theme of climate change, Geoffroy asked other pavilions if they would host a tent, as a metaphor for the sinking of the Maldives and the thousands of climate refugees that would result from it. A tent spray painted with the question “Can a nation welcome another nation?” was used for this gesture and was agreed to be ‘hosted’ in a spot by the Israeli Pavilion, in the No-Man's-Land between the Israeli and USA pavilions, however this was later removed by the police. On the theme of the climate emergency, Geoffroy had the intent of launching a “COP18B”, in reference to the failed climate conference of the previous year, seeing as a magnitude of important figures were in attendance at the biennale. Geoffroy also wore his blue helmet to show that the sinking of the Maldives should be a central concern of the UN.

=== Copenhagen Biennale, Various venues, since 2017 ===
In 2007, while working on the Biennalist format, Geoffroy had the idea to create a Biennale of “Ultracontemporary art” in Copenhagen. Initially, Geoffroy wanted to create a “Penetration Biennale”, a format where exhibiting artists opened their exhibition spaces to other artists, allowing them to take over and express their ideas through their art.This idea was also founded on the idea that artists had a need to express themselves in the moment of inspiration, and so by allowing artists to step into another’s exhibition space, the waiting time between concept and creation was shortened.The idea for the Biennale was for this openness and freedom of expression to be carried out throughout the city, in Copenhagen. The “Penetration Biennale” was never realised, as Geoffroy moved on to concipate the “La Biennale du Legionnaire”, a similar concept but this time with the focus on creating openness for immigrant artists to create in the Copenhagen artscene, this concept was proposed to the Danish Art Council but was rejected. In 2010, Geoffroy created the Copenhagen Biennale concept as a Facebook page which reached an audience of several thousand.Finally, in 2017, Geoffroy launched the Copenhagen Biennale together with Tijana Miskovic, over six weeks in Copenhagen. Geoffroy has reproduced the format four times since 2017.

=== Spur of the Moment, Moderna Museet, Stockholm, 1996 ===
This exhibition with the artist Jeff Guess was shown in three spaces: on the street, in the museum and on the internet page of Svenska Dagbladet. Photographs were taken during the exhibition's running and the film could be developed and printed within 1 hour. In total, there would be an accumulation of 10,000 photographs taken and shown in the 9-day exhibiting period. This project was conceived as a “personal form of mass media”, looking to detect and categorize emerging themes from the content and then distribute this. Time was a central concern of the project, an intrinsic aim being to shorten the gap between the photographs’ taking and its distribution to the highest degree possible. Themes that the exhibition commented on were particularly contextually relevant, looking at the many perspectives of the ongoing Water Festival Stockholm; including the recruiting activities of the army.

=== Biennale Socle du Monde, Herning Contemporary Art Museum, Herning, 2010 ===
For the Biennale Socle du Monde at Herning Contemporary Art Museum, which had the theme “Between Cultures”, Geoffroy focused his projects on immigrants in Denmark. The Museum itself has the largest collection of Piero Manzoni artworks and Geoffroy referenced the Italian artist's work through a project where he engaged immigrants in the task of cleaning up horse excrement left behind from the royal horse's passage and later packaging this excrement in ninety customized cans. This was both a darkly humorous nod to Manzoni but also an investigation into the question of how immigrants can be considered useful in Danish society. The cans were imbued with the branding “Merde de Cheval Royal” and “In advance of the Broken Arm”, a reference to Marcel Duchamp and containing the idea that by collecting the horse excrement, the immigrants were preventing accidents and therefore being “good immigrants”. He also had a ‘Penetration Wall’ where he featured Lebanese and Bosnian immigrant artist's work.

=== Constructing the World, Kunsthalle Mannheim, 2018 ===
In 2018, Geoffroy participated in a group show at the Kunsthalle Mannheim called “Constructing the World”, an exhibition examining the 2008 financial crisis, its effects on art and the contrast of this against past economic collapses. Other participating artists included Thomas Hirschhorn, Andreas Gursky and Jeremy Deller. Geoffroy exhibited several of his tent sculptures throughout the whole museum, having the opportunity to juxtapose his tents statements with other artworks from the museum collection, for example Joseph Beuys Filzanzug and Max Ernst's Capricorne, as well as land art pieces and Neue Sachlichkeit artworks. During the exhibition, he also organized Critical Runs.

=== What About Tourism? Gallerie Billedhuset, CPH, 1990 ===
In 1990, Geoffroy presented an exhibition on the topic of Tourism at Galerie Billedhuset in Copenhagen. Posters for the exhibition asked for visitors to bring their own tourist photos. Geoffroy exhibited his own cibachrome prints from India, in which he focuses on the behaviour of tourists abroad. This idea was expanded on through a series presenting Geoffroy's pseudo-anthropological endeavours of collecting photos from tourists in Thailand. Geoffroy revealed personal aspects of the individual (what they chose to photograph, what they did on their travels, who they traveled with, how long they traveled, etc.) and presented a record and commentary of tourist behaviour, in doing so also reflects on whether tourism is good for the people visited. Geoffroy also exhibited a picture of himself, with the words “I am not better than others”. Another section showed a photographic report of Geoffroy's time traveling with a tourist guide, featuring self criticism of his own behaviour and the sentiments encouraged by the tour guide.

== Television as an Exhibition Space ==
=== TV Crashing ===
Thierry Geoffroy/ Colonel first appearances on primetime television were through crashing news reports, the most famous of which was a stunt where he stood behind the news reporter, humorously imitating him with a stick of corn as a microphone, during a report on the 1998 football finale of Denmark vs. Brazil. This appeared on the Danish channels, DR and later TV2. Geoffroy's point was to show that football should not be reported as if it were more than entertainment. Over 3 million people or two-thirds of the Danish population, would see this clip. It was also featured in later exhibitions by the artist, with the title “Take care of Transgenic Mice”, its title referencing the stick of maize Geoffroy holds in the clip, as a reference to genetically modified corn. In a 1998 feature in Blender Magazine, Geoffroy was described as a “frequent guest of the ultimative space for public exposure: mass [media]”.

=== TV Series ===
Geoffroy used television as a platform for his art in 3 series made for Danmarks Radio, the main Danish channel. Called “Capitain”, “Immigranten” and “Photographe”, he plays different roles, progressing from a “professional tourist” to an “active immigrant” and finally to a photographer. The programs involved participations with the Danish public, often investigating notions of “Danishness'' and “otherness”. Geoffroy's purpose with these programs was to use television as a stage for his art, to reach as many people as possible rather than just a select art crowd The series became some of the most viewed content on the channel. Objects from the series have become part of the Heart Museum Denmark and NBK Berlin's permanent collections and have featured in installations by Sprengel Museum Hannover and Fries Museum Leeuwarden.

=== TV Film for Manifesta 8 in Murcia ===
As part of the Manifesta Biennale, “In Dialogue with Northern Africa”, Geoffroy made a short film for Spanish channel 7RM. This involved asking both Spanish and Northern African residents their opinions and experiences on this issue, also getting some people to interview each other. Here he played the character of the “Artist Colonialist”.

== Retrospective ==
In 2024, a retrospective book on Geoffroy’s work, entitled “Propulsive Retrospective”, was published by Snoeck Verlag, in collaboration with the Museum Villa Stuck Munich. The book goes into depth about the exhibitions, artworks and art formats of Geoffroy’s artistic oeuvre. It includes essays and texts by Sebastian Baden, Michael Buhrs, Jonatan Habib Engqvist, Carsten Friberg, Morten Friis, Christian Ganzenberg, Elena Hansen, Séamus Kealy, Tijana Mišković, Susana Puente Matos, Marie-France Rafael, Johanne Schrøder, Inka Schube and contributions from Mikkel Bøgh, Raphael Chikukwa, Julia Draganović, Mascha Faurschou, Åsmund Boye Kverneland, Christopher Lew, Madeleine Park and Holger Reenberg. It also includes a section with interviews of Geoffroy’s close collaborators through the years and a chronology of Geoffroy’s work. The book, which is over 600 pages, includes photos showing Geoffroy’s work in action, his earlier photographic work and pictures of different mixed media artworks Geoffroy has made.

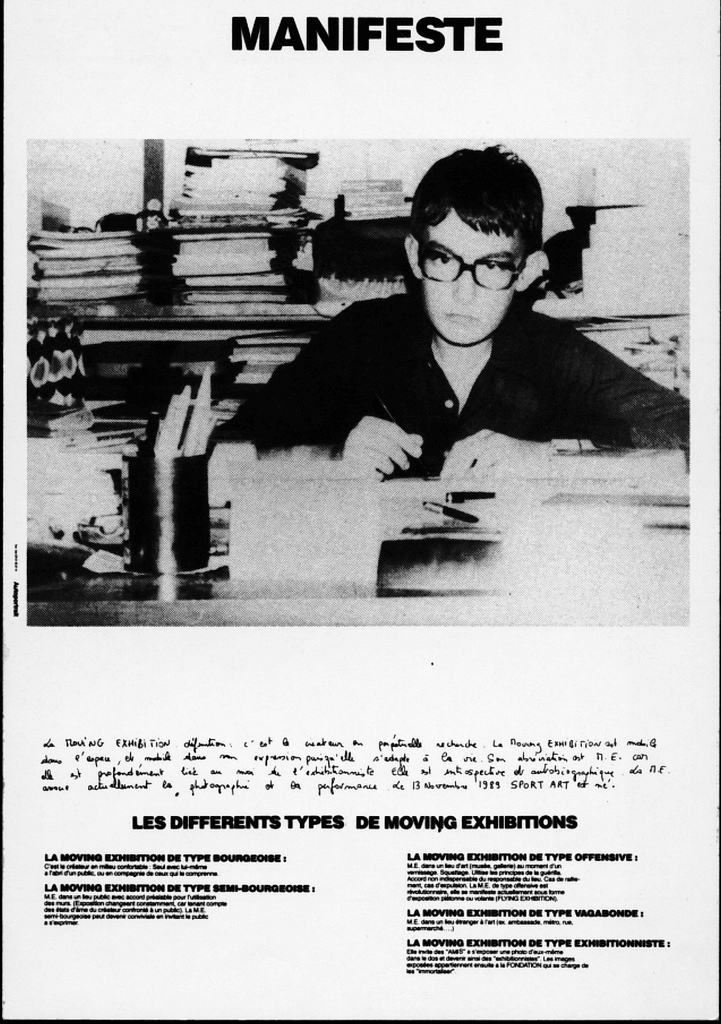
Manifest on 5 Types of Moving Exhibitions 1989

== Manifests ==
- Manifeste Moving Exhibition, Katalog, Brandts Klædefabrik, Odense, Denmark, 1989
- Sport Art Manifeste, Katalog, Brandts Klædefabrik, Odense, Denmark, 1991
- Sport Art Manifeste, Bildtidningen(S), 1991
- Colour Manifeste, Zoom,(F), März 1991
- Le conclusionisme, L'Alliance (BKK) (1992)
- In dialogue with Northern Africa, Manifesta 8, Murcia 201

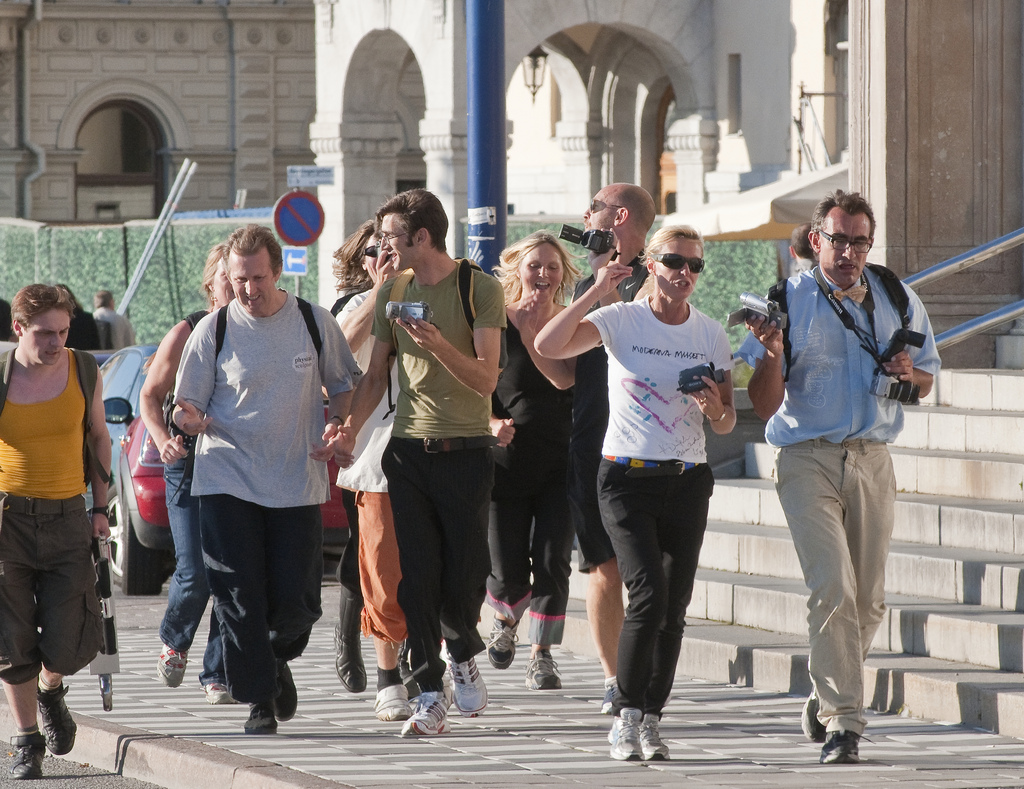
Thierry Geoffroy's critical run at Moderna Museet, Stockholm

== Publications ==
- 2024, Thierry Geoffroy / Colonel : a propulsive retrospective. Authors:Thierry Geoffroy (Artist), Michael Buhrs (Editor), Christian Ganzenberg (Editor) Sebastian Baden (Author), Museum Villa Stuck
- 2010, "Emergency Room Dictionary", Revolver, ISBN 978-3-86895-093-9, The Royal Danish Academy of Fine Arts
- 2005, "Self-measurements of Scottishness", text by Claudia Zeiske and Kevin Henderson
- 2002, "Avoir l' air", Forlaget Nifca, text by Rune Gade and [Line Rosenvinge], Helsinki The Nordic Institute for Contemporary Art 2002
- 1997, "Tourists in Thailand", Rhodos Forlag
- 1996, "Strategies d´existence", ISBN 978-87-7245-694-2, Rhodos Publishing
- 1995, Kulturministeriets Fotografiske Bogpris

== Awards ==
- 2003, "Chevalier des Arts et des Lettres"
- 2002, 3 years working grant from The National Arts Council
- 1995, Kulturministeriets Fotografiske Bogpris

== Solo exhibitions ==
- 2020, THE AWARENESS MUSCLE TRAINING CENTER, Museum Villa Stuck, München
- 2019, ‘Empathy’/Vejle Kunst Museum/DK.
- 2019, ‘Too Late’/Gallery Sabsay/Copenhagen/DK.
- 2018, ‘The Anatomy of Prejudice’/IKM Museum/Oslo/NO.
- 2017, ‘#documentasceptic’/Gallery Sabsay/Copenhagen/DK.
- 2013–2014, "In advance of the broken arm ?" Gallery Marianne Fries, Copenhagen
- 2011, Art Format: Emergency Room Poland, guest: Emergency Artists
- 2011, Art Format: Emergency Room Vietnam, university of fine arts, guest: Emergency Artists
- 2009, "Artistes de Garde" at gallery Poulsen, Copenhagen, guest: the Yes Men and Emergency Artists
- 2009, Art Format: Emergency Room Hanoi, university of fine arts with Emergency Artists
- 2009, PAN / NAPOLI format "Emergency Room Napoli"
- 2008, Art Format Emergency Room / Paris at Galerie Taiss
- 2008, Fotografisk center / Copenhagen "Gymnastic Mediatic"
- 2007, MoMA PS1, New York City "Emergency Room"
- 2007, "Biennalist" at the Venice Biennale
- 2007, "A Great Painter", Gallery Asbaek, Copenhagen
- 2007, Blackwood Gallery, Toronto, curated by Seamus Kealy
- 2007, Gallery Ileana Tounta, with emergency artist
- 2006, "Emergency Room the Berlin test", Gallerie Olaf Stüber, Berlin, with emergency artists
- 2006, Kunsthallen Nikolaj / Denmark, "Emergency Room" with Frank Franzen and with emergency artists
- 2006, Ovegaden / Institute for contemporary art, "Biocolonialism" with Khaled Ramadan
- 2005, "Isolation", IKM Museum, Oslo, Norway
- 2004, "The curator lifting competition" Nikolaj art center (DK), from the Venice Biennale
- 2004, "A pair of Genes", Stadtische Galerie Ravensburg (DE)
- 2004, "Avoir l´air", Fries Museum, Leeuwarden, the Netherlands
- 2004, "And Finally" Deveron Arts, Huntly, Aberdeenshire, Scotland
- 2004, "Colonel peintre de la justice", The Showrrom FDK /DK
- 2003, Galerie Olaf Stüber, Berlin, June 2003
- 2003, Berlin, Haus der Kulturen der Welt (DE)
- 2003, "The cheating fashion", Gallery Pio Diaz (DK)
- 2003, Helsingør Biblioteker, "The ultra fast exhibition" (DK)
- 2002, Sprengel Museum, Hannover (DE)
- 2001, Artspace Rhizom (DK)
- 2000, Fotografisk Center (DK)
- 2000, Det Nationale Fotomuseum (DK)
- 1999, Nikolaj Udstillingscenter (DK)
- 1999, Frederiksborg Castle (DK)
- 1999, Traneudstilling Gentofte Hovebibliotek (DK)
- 1997, Saaremaa Biennale, "Invasion", Estonia
- 1996, Moderna Museet, Stockholm
- 1996, Galerie Brott Fabrik, Berlin
- 1996, Færgen Kronborg (DK)
- 1996, Galleri Billedhuset, (DK)
- 1995, Fotofeis, Scotland
- 1995, Fotografisk Galleri (DK)
- 1994, Galleri Billedhuset (DK)
- 1994, Gallerie Pascal Lesnes, Paris
- 1993, Fotografisk Galleri (DK)
- 1993, Kunstakademiets Bibliotek (DK)
- 1990, Galleri Billedhuset (DK)
