= The Colonel =

The Colonel or the Colonels can refer to:

== People ==
- Steve Cropper, guitarist, songwriter and record producer
- Colonel Sanders, the founder of Kentucky Fried Chicken (KFC)
- Colonel Tom Parker, Elvis Presley's manager
- Jean-Charles Langlois, a 19th-century French soldier and painter
- Theodore Roosevelt, 26th president of the United States

== Arts ==
- The Colonel (play), an 1881 play by F.C. Burnand
- The Colonel (1917 film), a film directed by Michael Curtiz
- The Colonel (1974 film), a film directed by Chatrichalerm Yukol
- The Colonel (2006 film), a film directed by Laurent Herbiet
- The Colonel (Monty Python), a recurring character in Monty Python's Flying Circus, played by Graham Chapman
- The Colonel (One Hundred and One Dalmatians), character in the story One Hundred and One Dalmatians
- "The Colonel" (The Americans), a 2013 TV episode
- "The Colonel" (Home Improvement), a 1994 TV episode
- The Colonel, a character in the Conker series of video games
- The Colonel, the alias used by Colin Moulding of the band XTC for the 1980 single release of Too Many Cooks in the Kitchen
- The Colonel, the nickname of a character in the John Green novel Looking for Alaska
- The Colonel, a novel by Mahmoud Dowlatabadi
- The Colonel, the short form of the title for Alanna Nash's book The Colonel: The Extraordinary Story of Colonel Tom Parker and Elvis Presley

== Other ==
- The Colonel, informal name for anyone with the military rank of colonel, whether actively serving or retired. See also Kentucky colonel
- The Colonel (horse), a thoroughbred racehorse

== The Colonels ==
- The Colonels, a 1986 novel by W.E.B. Griffin
- The Colonels, the regime of Polish colonels during the period 1926-1939
- The Colonels, the Greek military junta of 1967–1974
- The Colonels, rule by senior military officials, see military junta

== See also ==
- Colonel (disambiguation)
